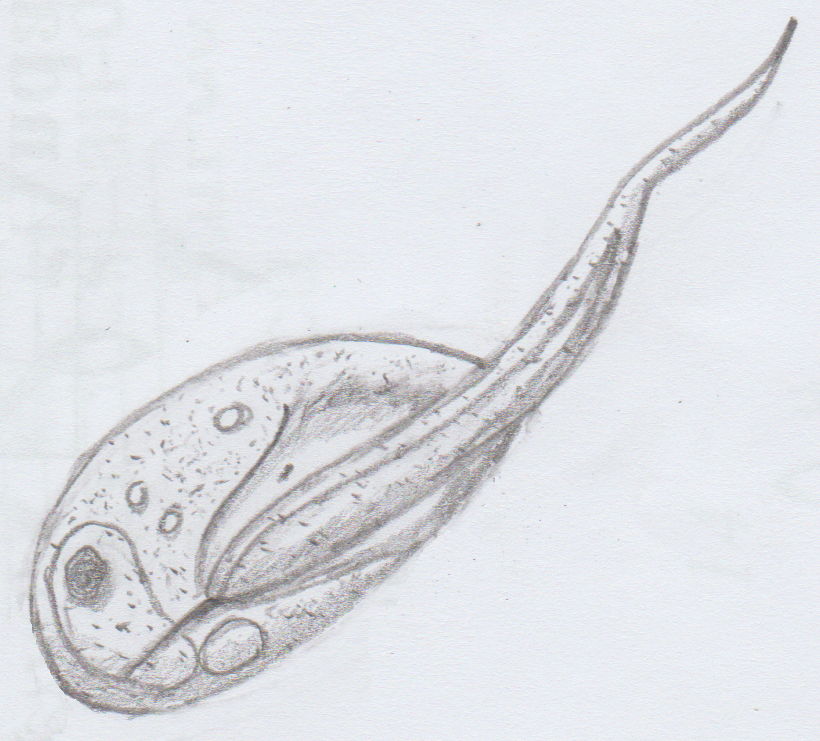
- Apusomonas sp.

Scientific classification (obsolete)
- Domain: Eukaryota
- Clade: Podiata
- Clade: Amorphea
- Clade: Obazoa
- Phylum: Apusozoa; Cavalier-Smith 1997, emend. 2013

Groups included
- Thecomonadea; Breviatea

Cladistically included but traditionally excluded taxa
- Opisthokonta

= Apusozoa =

Phylum of micro-organisms

The Apusozoa are a paraphyletic phylum of flagellate eukaryotes. They are usually around 5–20 μm in size, and occur in soils and aquatic habitats, where they feed on bacteria. They are grouped together based on the presence of an organic shell or theca under the dorsal surface of the cell.

The name derives from the Ancient Greek words for footless (ἄπους) and animal (ζῷον).

This phylum was defined as containing the Breviata and the Apusomonadida. However, it is viewed as paraphyletic, with the Breviata as more basal. The opisthokonts appear to have emerged as sister of the Apusomonadida. It has been suggested that the Mantamonadida be classified in Apusozoa.

The Ancyromonadida appear to be Varisulca, Planomonadida, shifting them possibly more basal than the Amoebozoa, or less basal. While some classification systems have placed Hemimastigida in Apusozoa, 2018 research indicated that hemimastigotes (Hemimastix kukwesjijk/Hemimastix/Spironematellidae) are their own supra-kingdom.

== Characteristics ==
The apusomonads have two flagella inserted at right angles, near the anterior of the cell. They move by gliding, with one flagellum trailing along the side and one directed to the anterior.

The form of the mitochondria varies between the different orders. Among the apusomonads they have tubular cristae, the ancyromonads flat cristae, and the hemimastigids ambiguous or sacculate cristae. This characteristic was originally considered a good indicator of relationships, but is now known to vary even among close relatives.

== Evolution ==
As currently defined, Apusozoa is a paraphyletic grade that includes two classes: Thecomonadea (the apusomonad flagellates) and Breviatea (the breviate amoebae), each of them monophyletic and sister groups to the Opisthokonta supergroup. Together, these three clades are part of the larger clade Obazoa, which in turn is the sister group to the Amoebozoa supergroup.

- Podiata
  - CRuMs
  - Amorphea
    - Amoebozoa
    - Obazoa
      - Breviatea
      - - Thecomonadea
        - Opisthokonta
          - Holozoa (includes animals)
          - Holomycota (includes fungi)
