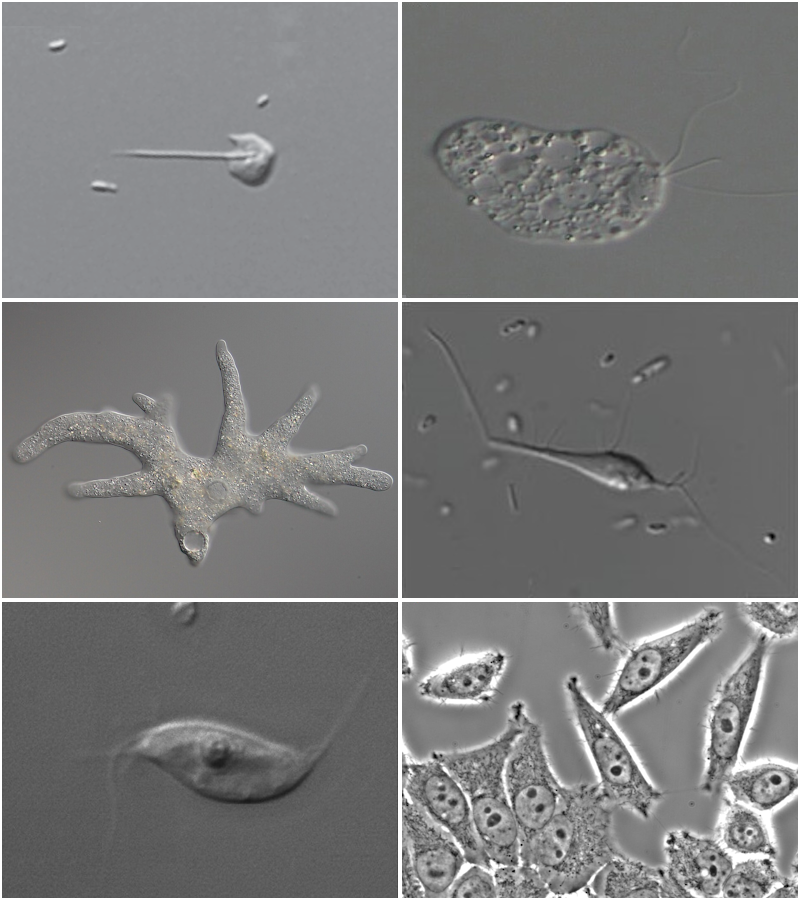
- Podiate diversity. From top left corner: Mantamonas sphyraenae (Mantamonadida), Collodictyon sp. (Diphylleida), Amoeba proteus (Amoebozoa), an undescribed Breviatea, Podomonas kaiyoae (Apusomonadida), and human HeLa cells (Opisthokonta)

Scientific classification
- Domain: Eukaryota
- Clade: Podiata; Cavalier-Smith 2012

Subgroups
- CRuMs; Amorphea; Amoebozoa; Obazoa (incl. animals and fungi)

= Podiata =

Clade of eukaryotes

Podiata is a proposed evolutionary group that includes most described species of eukaryotic life. It contains two lineages: Amorphea, which includes animals, fungi, amoebozoans, and their closest relatives; and CRuMs, a small group of single-celled flagellates and amoebae. Members of Podiata are informally known as podiates and share the ability to produce pseudopodia.

== History ==
Eukaryotes (organisms whose cells contain nuclei) have traditionally been divided into four categories or 'kingdoms' of life: animals, plants, fungi, and protists. Among these categories, protists do not form a natural group or clade; instead, they comprise a broad assortment of many separate clades from which plants, animals and fungi evolved. Since the early 2000s, evolutionary studies have gradually organized these clades into a number of larger clades, commonly known as supergroups. For example, the animals, fungi and their closest protist relatives belong to the Opisthokonta supergroup, while plants compose the Archaeplastida supergroup. There are several protist-only supergroups, such as the Amoebozoa, closely related to opisthokonts.

Besides supergroups, there are many smaller groups of 'orphan' protists, whose placement is difficult to resolve. Among these were: apusomonads, breviates, collodictyonids, ancyromonads (=planomonads), mantamonads, and rigifilids. All are heterotrophs, most with some kind of groove or aperture on the ventral side of the cell, the ability to form fine pseudopodia (filopodia), and at least two flagella. Upon the description of these protists, some had genetic sequences completely distinct from previously known groups, while others showed only weak affinities.

- Eukaryotes
  - Excavata
  - Neozoa
    - Podiates
      - - Amoebozoa
        - - Opisthokonta (animals, fungi)
          - Apusozoa
      - Varisulca
    - Corticates
      - Plantae
      - Chromista

Thomas Cavalier-Smith's 2013 hypothesis for the evolution of eukaryotes, in which he coined 'podiates'. The phylum Sulcozoa was described with two subphyla: Apusozoa, containing apusomonads and breviates, and Varisulca, containing CRuMs and ancyromonads — later excluded, as Varisulca was synonymized with CRuMs.

During the early 2010s, phylogenomic analyses allowed to more strongly resolve these protists as relatives of amoebozoans and opisthokonts. In 2013, Cavalier-Smith described a now obsolete phylum, Sulcozoa, to gather these orphan taxa. He coined the term podiate to refer to the clade uniting sulcozoans, amoebozoans and opisthokonts. He proposed that podiates are distinguished in their formation of filopodia, as well as the loss of ciliary vanes, which are present in excavates and some corticates. As sulcozoans are bi-flagellated, this union led to the rejection of the earlier 'unikont' hypothesis, which posited that the common ancestor of amoebozoans and opisthokonts had only one flagellum. Instead of Unikonta, the clade containing amoebozoans and opisthokonts became known as Amorphea, in reference to the generally amorphous shape of their cells in absence of an external structure.

In later years, following further phylogenomic analyses, the concept of Sulcozoa remained in disuse by other authors, as it was a paraphyletic group. The apusomonads and breviates were resolved as more closely related to opisthokonts than amoebozoans, together forming the clade Obazoa within Amorphea. Collodictyonids, rigifilids, and mantamonads were resolved as a separate clade, CRuMs, which branches as sister to Amorphea. The term Podiata remains in use as the clade containing CRuMs and Amorphea; ancyromonads are generally excluded from it, as their position is still unstable.

The term Sarcomastigota was proposed by Cavalier-Smith as a subkingdom of the obsolete kingdom Protozoa, which included all podiates excepts animals and fungi.

== Diversity and evolution ==
Podiata is composed of two lineages of heterotrophic eukaryotes: CRuMs and Amorphea. CRuMs is composed of several small groups of single-celled protists that vary in shape, from flagellates with four flagella to amoebae. These are primarily collodictyonids, rigifilids and mantamonads. Within Amorphea are two major lineages: the opisthokonts, which include animals, fungi, and their closest protist relatives (over 1.5 million species), and the amoebozoans, which include many amoeboid organisms and slime molds (around 2,400 species). There are two smaller groups of Amorphea known as breviates and apusomonads.

Groups of Podiata have a shared synapomorphy of a capability to produce pseudopodia, unlike the possibly related malawimonads and ancyromonads. Members of Amorphea uniquely have a palintomic cell division, which CRuMs species lack. A trait found in a few groups of Podiata is the presence of a rigid pellicle, namely in apusomonads and possibly rigifilids; it is unclear whether it is homologous with the pellicle observed in ancyromonads.

The cladogram below summarizes the current understanding of Podiata and its internal evolution, according to 2025 phylogenomic analyses.

- Eukaryotes
  - Other eukaryotes
  - Opimoda
    - Malawimonadida
    - Ancyromonadida
    - - Podiata
        - CRuMs
          - - - Diphylleida
              - Rigifilida
            - Glissandrida
          - Mantamonadida
        - Amorphea
          - Amoebozoa
          - Obazoa
            - Breviatea
            - - Apusomonadida
              - Opisthokonta
