= Rigifila =

Scientific classification
- Domain: Eukaryota
- Clade: CRuMs
- Class: Hilomonadea
- Order: Rigifilida
- Family: Rigifilidae; Yabuki & Cavalier-Smith 2012
- Genus: Rigifila; Yabuki & Cavalier-Smith 2012
- Species: R. ramosa

Binomial name
- Rigifila ramosa Yabuki & Cavalier-Smith 2012

Genus of protozoans

Rigifila (from Latin rigidus 'stiff' and filum 'thread') is a genus of free-living single-celled eukaryotes, or protists, containing the sole species Rigifila ramosa (from Latin ramosus 'branched'). It is classified within the monotypic family Rigifilidae. Along with Micronucleariidae, it is a member of Rigifilida, an order of basal eukaryotes within the CRuMs clade. It differs from Micronuclearia by having two proteic layers surrounding their cytoplasm instead of a single one, and having more irregular mitochondrial cristae, among other morphological differences.

== Systematics ==
=== Etymology ===
The name of this genus is derived from Latin rigidus 'stiff', referring to the rigid the cell body due to their submembrane proteic layers, and filum 'thread', referring to the filopodia (thin thread-like pseudopodia). The species epithet is derived from Latin ramosus 'branched', referring to the branched filopodia exhibited by the organism.

=== Classification ===
The species Rigifila ramosa was described in 2012 by biologists Akinori Yabuki, Ken-Ichiro Ishida and Thomas Cavalier-Smith from freshwater amoebae isolated in an Indian paddy field water sample. Although they presented a similar structure to Micronuclearia, unique morphological differences and phylogenetic position of these newly discovered amoebae led to the creation of a separate genus, Rigifila, and a separate family, Rigifilidae.

In addition, a new order Rigifilida was described to group the two similar organisms, Rigifila and Micronuclearia. This order was placed within Hilomonadea, a class which previously included Planomonadida but was emended to only include Rigifilida. Hilomonadea is currently considered one of the three clades of CRuMs, a basal eukaryotic clade closely related to Amorphea, the clade containing Amoebozoa and Opisthokonta.

== Biology ==
=== Cell structure ===
Rigifila are unicellular protozoa. As all members of Rigifilida, they lack cilia, but generate slender branching filopodia that can attach to the substrate. These filopodia lack any microtubules or extrusomes, and arise from the ventral side of the cell through a common filopodial stem, which is surrounded by an aperture. Under the cell membrane, they present a double-layered proteinaceous lamina (or pellicle) that covers the whole cell body, making it rigid except for the ventral aperture. They have one nucleus on the dorsal side of the cell.

Rigifila, and by extension all of Rigifilidae, differs from Micronucleariidae by having two pellicular dense layers, as opposed to a single-layered pellicle. In addition, they exhibit several broad microtubular bands, of around 20 microtubules each, underneath the dorsal and lateral pellicle, while Micronuclearia lost all cytoplasmic microtubules. Mitochondrial cristae are completely flat in Micronuclearia, but partially flat and partially inflated in Rigifila.

=== Feeding ===
Rigifila are free-living phagotrophic organisms. They feed on bacteria, which they collect with their filopodia and ingest at the base of a ventral collar or aperture that surrounds the base of the filopodial stem.
