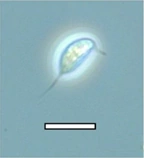
- Amastigomonas; Bar is 10 micrometres.

Scientific classification
- Domain: Eukaryota
- Clade: Amorphea
- Class: Thecomonadea
- Order: Apusomonadida
- Family: Apusomonadidae
- Genus: Amastigomonas de Saedeleer 1931

Type species
- Amastigomonas debruynei de Saedeleer 1931

Species
- Amastigomonas caudata; Amastigomonas debruynei; Amastigomonas marisrubri

= Amastigomonas =

Genus of protozoa with two flagella

Amastigomonas is a genus of protists belonging to a lineage of biciliated zooflagellates known as Apusomonadida. It was first described in 1931 by Henri de Saedeleer. The current use of Amastigomonas is as a descriptive archetype, with no phylogenetic or taxonomic implications. The term "Amastigomonas-like" is used to refer to all apusomonads that lack the 'derived' characteristics of Apusomonas.

== Description ==
Organisms under the name "Amastigomonas" have an oval or oblong cell that can generate pseudopodia from the ventral surface. They lack a mastigophore, a projection of the cell body that contains both basal bodies at its end. Like all Apusomonadida, they have two flagella, and the anterior flagellum is surrounded by a membranous sleeve.

== Current use of the name ==
Historically, the name Amastigomonas was used for any apusomonad species that had 'primitive' characteristics compared to the more 'derived' characteristics of Apusomonas. Molecular phylogenetic analyses have shown that Apusomonas branches inside Amastigomonas, making this genus paraphyletic. As a result, many species of Amastigomonas have been reassigned to new genera—Thecamonas, Podomonas, Manchomonas, Multimonas, Chelonemonas, Catacumbia, Cavaliersmithia, Karpovia, Mylnikovia and Singekia—, and no currently cultured apusomonad matches the original description of Amastigomonas.

- Apusomonadida
  - - - Apusomonas
      - Manchomonas
    - - Karpovia
      - - Singekia
        - - Chelonemonas
          - Thecamonas
  - - - - - Cavaliersmithia
          - Catacumbia
        - Mylnikovia
      - Multimonas
    - Podomonas

== Species and distribution ==
- Amastigomonas caudata Karpov & Mylnikov 1989 (marine strain, possibly related to Multimonas).
- Amastigomonas debruynei de Saedeleer 1931 (synonymized into Thecamonas trahens Larsen & Patterson, 1990)
- Amastigomonas marisrubri Mylnikov & Mylnikova 2012
