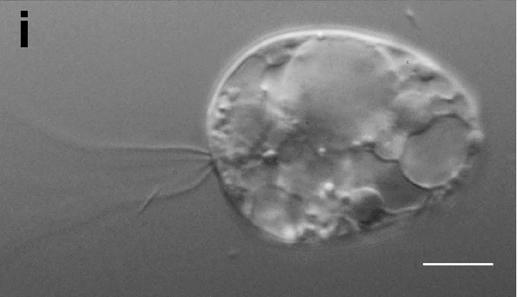
- Collodictyon triciliatum

Scientific classification
- Domain: Eukaryota
- Clade: CRuMs
- Class: Diphyllatea
- Order: Diphylleida
- Family: Diphylleidae; Cavalier-Smith 1993

Genera
- Collodictyon; Diphylleia

Synonyms
- Collodictyonidae Brugerolle et al. 2002

= Diphylleidae =

Family of aquatic microorganisms

Diphylleidae (also Collodictyonidae) is a group of aquatic, unicellular eukaryotic organisms with two to four terminal flagella. They feed by phagocytosis, ingesting other unicellular organisms like algae and bacteria. It is the sister group of Sulcomonadidae.

Recent molecular analyses place collodictyonids (e.g. Collodictyon) in a clade also containing Rigifilida and Mantamonadidae. This clade has been named CRuMs and is sister to Amorphea.

== Phylogeny ==
- Opimoda
  - Ancyromonadida
  - - Malawimonadea
    - Podiata
      - Amorphea
        - Amoebozoa
        - Obazoa
          - Breviatea
          - - Apusomonadida
            - Opisthokonta
      - CRuMs
        - Mantamonadida
        - - Glissandrida
          - - Rigifilida
            - Diphylleida

== Taxonomy ==
- Family Diphylleidae Cavalier-Smith 1993 [Collodictyonidae Brugerolle et al. 2002]
  - Genus Diphylleia Massart 1920 non Michaux 1803 [Aulacomonas Skuja 1939]
    - Species D. rotans Massart 1920 [Aulacomonas submarina Skuja 1939]
  - Genus Collodictyon Carter 1865
    - Species C. hongkongense Skvortzov 1968
    - Species C. indicum Iyengar 1981
    - Species C. oxycareni Franchini 1922
    - Species C. sparsevacuolatum Skuja 1956
    - Species C. triciliatum Carter 1865
