= Thecamonas trahens =

Scientific classification
- Domain: Eukaryota
- Clade: Obazoa
- Class: Thecomonadea
- Order: Apusomonadida
- Family: Apusomonadidae
- Genus: Thecamonas
- Species: T. trahens

Binomial name
- Thecamonas trahens Larsen & Patterson, 1990

Synonyms
- Amastigonas trahens

Species of protist

Thecamonas trahens is a single-celled eukaryotic organism belonging to the supergroup Opisthokonta and the lineage Apusomonadida, specifically within the high level group Amorphea. Members of this family, known as apusomonads, are gliding heterotrophic protozoan zooflagellates that primarily feed on bacteria and other prokaryotes.

== Description ==
Thecamonas has a 'tusk' that projects outwards anteriorly, and two flagella. Their anterior basal body associates with one leftward-travelling micro tubular root, and a 'ribbon'-like organisation of six microtubules that travel down the right side of the cell.

== Taxonomy ==
Thecamonas trahens is a species within the family Apusomonadidae, a group that is a sister taxon to the Opisthokonts.

== Ecology ==
Thecamonas trahens occurs in marine, freshwater, and terrestrial environments, and was initially isolated and cultured from marine benthic sites in tropical regions. In these environments, Thecamonas trahens primarily thrives by feeding on prokaryotic organisms. Additionally, Thecamonas trahens possesses genes associated with histidine kinases in cell signaling pathways, animal-like sodium channels, glycolytic mitochondrial metabolism, and calcium signaling—traits linked to the evolution of multicellularity. The discovery of sodium channel analogs in Thecamonas suggests that voltage-gated Na⁺ channels may have evolved before the divergence of animals and fungi.
