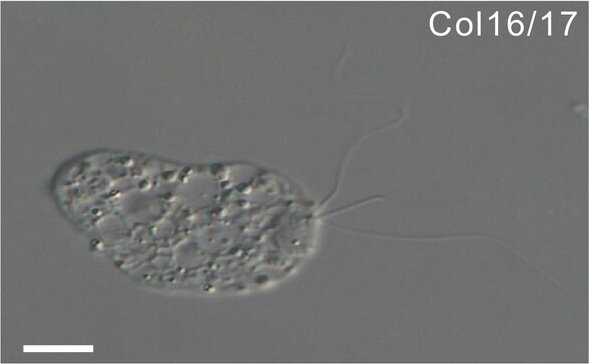
- Differential interference contrast micrograph of Collodictyon sp. Scale bar: 10 μm.

Scientific classification
- Domain: Eukaryota
- Clade: CRuMs
- Class: Diphyllatea
- Order: Diphylleida
- Family: Diphylleidae
- Genus: Collodictyon; Carter 1865

Type species
- Collodictyon triciliatum Carter 1865

Other species
- C. hongkongense Skvortzov 1968; C. indicum Iyengar 1981; C. sparsevacuolatum Skuja 1956

= Collodictyon =

Genus of protists

Collodictyon is a genus of single-celled, omnivorous eukaryotes belonging to the collodictyonids, also known as diphylleids. Due to their mix of cellular components, collodictyonids do not belong to any well-known kingdom-level grouping of that domain and this makes them distinctive from other families. Recent research places them in a new "super-group" called CRuMs together with rigifilids and Mantamonas.

== Taxonomy and phylogeny ==
- Eukaryotes
  - Unikonta
    - Amoebozoa
      Amoeba
    - - metazoa (Animals)
        Humans
      - Fungi
  - - "bikonta"
      - - plants
        - red algae
      - Paramecium
    - Collodictyon

Phylogenetic position of Collodictyon relative to a few example organisms

Four species are currently recognised in this genus. The type species is Collodictyon triciliatum. A second species—Collodictyon sparsevacuolatum—named by Skuja is also recognised; this species is found in freshwater in the United States and Europe. A third species Collodictyon sphaericum has been described but its description is in doubt and reclassified as Quadricilia rotundata (Skuja 1948) Vørs 1992. A fourth species—Collodictyon hongkongense—has been described by Skvortzow.

- C. hongkongense Skvortzov 1968
- C. indicum Iyengar 1981
- C. sparsevacuolatum Skuja 1956
- C. triciliatum Carter 1865

Along with the genus Diphylleia, this organism appears to be only distantly related to the other eukaryotes. They share some morphological features with the species formerly placed within Excavata due to the fact that the Collodictyon sulcus is similar because it also contains a supporting structure from left and right microtubular roots that line the entirety of the lips of the Sulcus. However this latter clade is considered to be polyphyletic and in need of resolution (reorganisation into different groups). They also share similar features as Amoebozoa because the feeding groove of Collodictyon also form pseudopods at the base which have a related function to the pseudopods in Amoebozoa. The pseudopods in both Amoebozoa and Collodictyon are used in order to catch prey.

Brugerolle has proposed a family, Collodictyonidae for this genus and Diphylleia.

Another genus that is related to Collodictyon is Sulcomonas.

Scientists speculate that further study of Collodictyon may yield insights into the prehistoric beginnings of life hundreds of millions of years ago. Scientists from Norway have been studying a particular type of Collodictyon found living in sludge in Årungen, a lake in the municipality of Ås in Norway. Kamran Shalchian-Tabrizi, the leader of the Microbial Evolution Research Group (MERG), has claimed that these organisms resemble the basal eukaryote.

Collodictyonids were placed by Cavalier-Smith in Varisulca, but this grouping appears to be paraphyletic.

== Description ==
The species in this genus range in size from 30 to 50 μm in length, can grow broad pseudopodia, and have four flagella and a ventral feeding groove which divides the organism longitudinally called the Sulcus. They are devoid of cellulosic cell walls, chloroplasts or stigmata. There are two to several contractile vacuoles.

The cell shape is variable but is mostly obovoid to ellipsoid. The lateral cell margins maybe somewhat angular leading to a broad, truncated rounded apex. This posterior margin narrows posteriorly and either bears 1-3 lobes or is simply broadly rounded. This margin is often pseudopodial.

The nucleus typically lies in the posterior half of the cell.

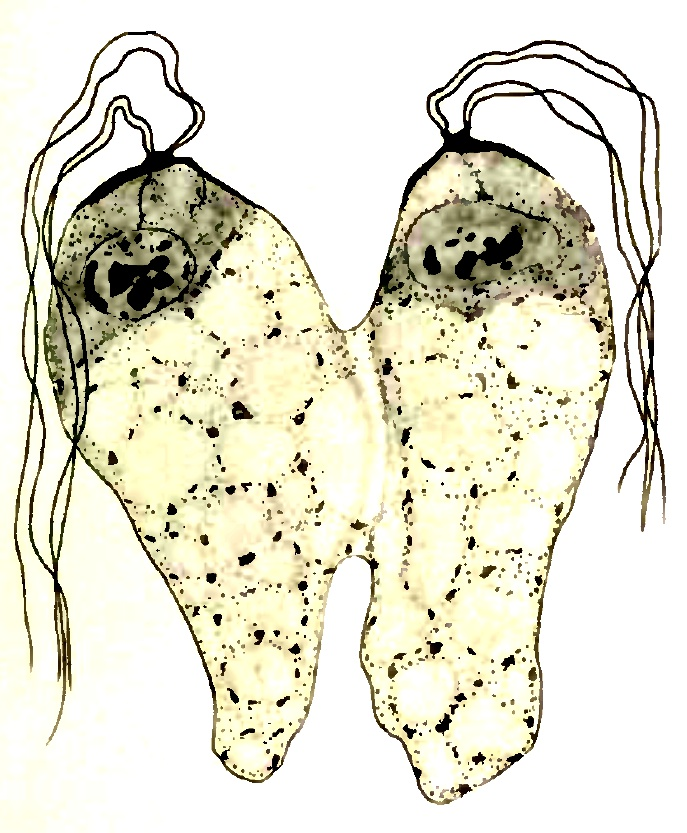
Joining of the Sulcus during Prophase

The mitochondria have tubular cristae.

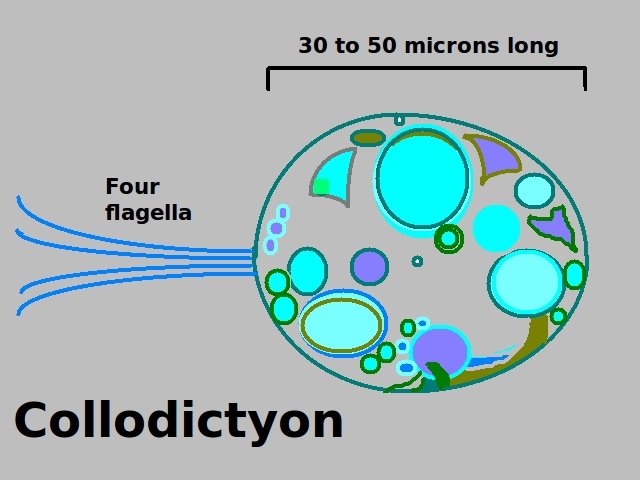
Sketch of Collodictyon.

Organelles called dictyosomes are present and arranged in a horseshoe like shape.

Members of this genus are known to reproduce asexually through cell division. Whether sexual reproduction occurs is currently unknown.

Collodictyon triciliatum has four flagella connected to basal bodies, generally of equal length, as long as or slightly longer than the body of Collodictyon. Number one flagellum is connected to a dorsal root, while number two flagellum is connected to a ventral root. Number three and four flagella are on either side of these two and have dorsal roots.

== Distribution ==
Originally Collodictyon triciliatum was described from the island of Bombay and later in central Europe. In Europe this species is found from Spain to Norway. Collodictyon has also been reported in North America.

== Feeding ==
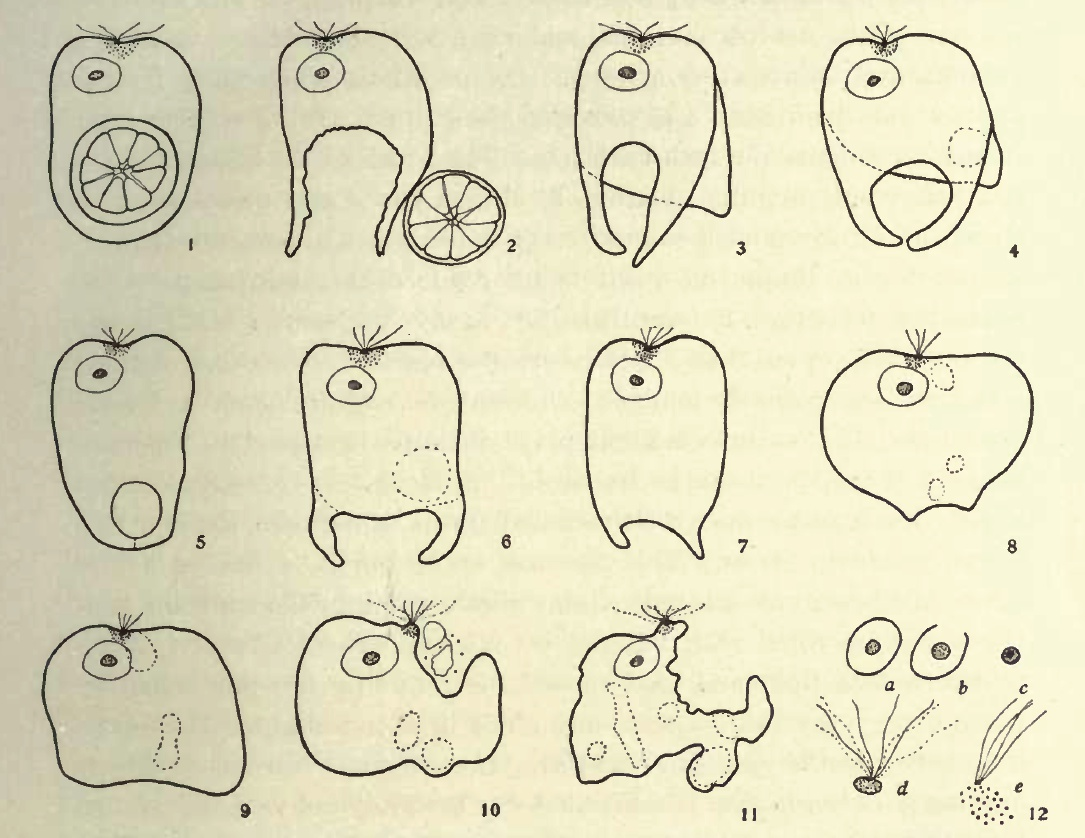
Diagram of Collodictyon failed ingestion of a Pandorina. The Pandorina escapes and the Collodictyon dies from water loss. Sketched by researcher Robert Clinton Rhodes; sketch appeared in print in 1917.

The feeding habits of this organism have rarely been studied.

In its feeding habits, Collodictyon is most interesting. When hungry, it can be distinguished from moribund stages in which all food is extruded by pseudopial projections from the lateral groove or sulcal region ... these pseudopodia ... function actively whenever the organism is seeking food. At these times when coming in contact with Protozoa or algae which it may use for food, they are wafted to the sulcal region by the flagella, or else Collodictyon aligns itself alongside of its prey with the pseudopodia in contact. ... Both the flagella and the pseudopodia appear sensitive to food stimulus ...

— Robert Clinton Rhodes, 1917

Dag Klaveness reported that the creatures are "not sociable" and will cannibalize each other when food is scarce. Collodictyon will ingest freshwater algae and appears to be unable to survive on a diet of bacteria alone. Curiously the algae remain viable at least for a while after being engulfed. It is possible that the algae are "enslaved".

== History ==
Collodictyon triciliatum was originally named by H. J. Carter in 1865. Carter's original species description is as follows:

Pyriform, straight, or slightly bent upon itself, bifid (two-lobed) at the small extremity, presenting at the larger one an indentation, from which spring three cilia. Structure transparent, cancellated, composed of globular cells, with a strongly marked, greenish granule here and there in the triangular spaces between them. Locomotive, swimming by means of the cilia; subpolymorphic, flexible, yielding, capable of assuming a globular form ... or one more or less modified by the body it may incept . . . ; enclosing crude material for nourishment in stomachal spaces, and ejecting the refuse, like Amoeba. Provided with a nucleus and contracting vesicles.

— Carter, 1865

In 1917, it was classified as being one of the "simplest and most primitive" type of Polymastigina.

== See also ==
- Collodictyon triciliatum at 400x in phase contrast by microuruguay 25 June 2011 Video on YouTube
