= Rigifilida =

Scientific classification
- Domain: Eukaryota
- Clade: CRuMs
- Class: Hilomonadea; Cavalier-Smith 2008, emend. 2012
- Order: Rigifilida; Cavalier-Smith in Yabuki et al. 2012

Families
- Micronucleariidae; Rigifilidae

Order of microorganisms

Rigifilida is a clade of non-ciliate phagotrophic eukaryotes. It consists of two genera: Micronuclearia and Rigifila.

== Characteristics ==
Cells of rigifilids are covered with either a single or a double-layered submembrane pellicular lamina that makes them rigid in consistence. Slender branching filopodia emanate from a ventral aperture of the cell and are employed to collect bacteria upon which they feed and to attach the organism to the substratum. Around this aperture, the pellicle is reflexed around forming a peristomial collar. Other notable features are flat and irregular shaped mitocondrial cristae, a single dorsal nucleus and the lack of centrioles and cilia.

== Phylogeny ==
- Opimoda
  - Ancyromonadida
  - - Malawimonadea
    - - Amorphea
        - Amoebozoa
        - Obazoa
          - Breviatea
          - - Apusomonadida
            - Opisthokonta
      - CRuMs
        - Mantamonadida
        - - Glissandrida
          - - Rigifilida
            - Diphylleida

== Taxonomy ==
Rigifilida is currently placed in CRuMs.

- Order Rigifilida Cavalier-Smith 2012 [Micronucleariida Cavalier-Smith 2008]
  - Family Rigifilidae Yabuki & Cavalier-Smith 2012
    - Genus Rigifila Yabuki & Cavalier-Smith 2012
      - Species Rigifila ramosa Yabuki & Cavalier-Smith 2012
  - Family Micronucleariidae Cavalier-Smith 2008
    - Genus Micronuclearia Mikrjukov & Mylnikov 2001
      - Species Micronuclearia podoventralis Mikrjukov & Mylnikov 2001
