= Divimonas =

Scientific classification
- Domain: Eukaryota
- Order: Ancyromonadida
- Family: incertae sedis
- Genus: Divimonas; Barkhouse, Eglit, Weston & Simpson 2025
- Species: D. melba

Binomial name
- Divimonas melba (Simpson & Patterson 1996) Barkhouse, Eglit, Weston & Simpson 2025

Synonyms
- Ancyromonas melba Simpson & Patterson 1996

Genus of flagellates

Divimonas is a genus of flagellates containing the single species Divimonas melba, found in sediments from hypersaline lakes and antarctic material. It belongs to the ancyromonads, a group of small flagellated microbes with a basal position in the eukaryotic tree of life. The species was initially classified within the genus Ancyromonas, but through genetic analysis it was determined to belong to a different evolutionary branch from that of any previously known ancyromonad.

== Etymology ==
The name of genus Divimonas is a reference to the divi-divi (Libidibia coriaria), the national tree of Curaçao, the island where the species was first successfully isolated. It is followed by -monas (from Greek μονάς, meaning 'unit'), a common suffix for single-celled protists. The epithet melba has no specified etymology.

== Description ==
Divimonas melba is a species of single-celled free-living flagellates. Their ovoid cells (4.2–4.6 μm in length, 3.4–3.7 μm in width) are flattened on the dorsal and ventral sides with the ventral side hollowed, sometimes with a typical ancyromonad "bean shape" due to an indented left edge and a rounded right edge. A ventral groove originates from the anterior ventral end (rostrum or "snout"), and runs longitudinally down the surface, continuing as a ventral crease rather than a depression. The rostrum contains spherical bumps that are presumably extrusomes.

Each cell has two flagella. The posterior flagellum (9.7–10.5 μm long) emerges from the anterior end of the ventral groove and is held under the cell and used to attach to surfaces. The anterior flagellum (3.8–4.7 μm long) emerges from a small depression at the anterior dorsal end, and sweeps back and forth in front of the cell. Both flagella have a similar thickness.

D. melba has been observed performing asexual reproduction through cell division, in which the daughter cells are last separated at the posterior end. It has not been observed feeding, but probable digestive vacuoles have been observed, presumably with bacteria.

== Distribution ==
Divimonas melba has been found in hypersaline lakes from the Shark Bay region of Western Australia and from the Caribbean island of Curaçao. It has also been observed in material obtained from Antarctica, meaning it may not be restricted to hypersaline environments.

== Taxonomy ==
Cells of this species were originally described in 1996 by protistologists David J. Patterson and Alastair G. B. Simpson, who discovered them in two hypersaline lakes in the Shark Bay region of Western Australia. They described them as a new species, Ancyromonas melba, due to the cells being strongly reminiscent of Ancyromonas sigmoides in several morphological features. As such, it was classified in the Ancyromonadida, a group of small eukaryotes with a basal position in eukaryotic evolution. However, this classification remained uncertain, as its morphological features were still very different from A. sigmoides and all other ancyromonads.

In 2025, the first molecular data of A. melba was obtained. Cells of A. melba were isolated from salt crust samples belonging to a hypersaline pond near Fort Beekenburg, Curaçao. Their SSU rRNA gene was sequenced. Through a phylogenetic analysis performed with this gene, it was revealed that its evolutionary position is not within any known genus of ancyromonads, but as a new separate branch. Consequently, the species was transferred to a new genus and renamed as Divimonas melba. The genus Divimonas is considered incertae sedis within the order Ancyromonadida, as it is unclear to which family it should be assigned.
