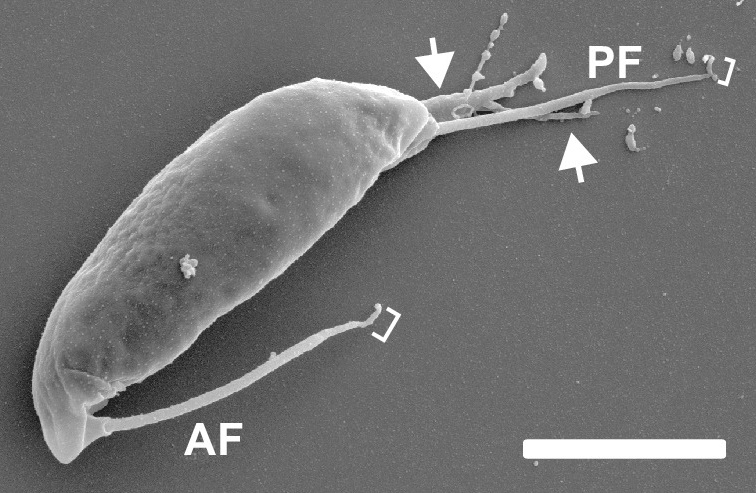
- SEM image of Podomonas kaiyoae.

Scientific classification
- Domain: Eukaryota
- Clade: Obazoa
- Class: Thecomonadea
- Order: Apusomonadida
- Family: Apusomonadidae
- Genus: Podomonas; Cavalier-Smith 2010

Type species
- Podomonas magna Cavalier-Smith 2010

Species
- P. capensis; P. gigantea; P. griebensis; P. kaiyoae; P. klosteris; P. magna

= Podomonas =

Genus of protists

Podomonas is a genus of apusomonads, a group of small zooflagellates that glide on their posterior cilium. The genus was identified in 2010 as an independent lineage from Apusomonas and Amastigomonas, and consequently were described as their own separate taxon, containing many species previously assigned to Amastigomonas.

== Cell structure ==
Podomonas are ovoid or fusiform apusomonads, not divided into cell body and mastigophore. They lack a dense rod associated with the 8-microtubule band, just like Thecamonas but unlike Apusomonas and Manchomonas. The ciliary sleeve is inconspicuous, around 1.5 μm long, seemingly triangular and merging into the ciliary base, pointing anteriorly or slightly to the left. The anterior cilium is strongly acronematic, unlike Manchomonas, but has a non-acronematic base extending several microns beyond the sleeve tip. The posterior cilium is acronematic or tapering, with a non-acronematic portion that extends visibly beyond the rear of the cell. The nucleus is anterior, close to the centrioles. They have finger-like, lamellar or reticulose pseudopods copiously emitted by the left or posterior side of the cell. The cytoplasm is highly granular. When cultured in the absence of any other organism, Podomonas extend a prominent pseudopodium.

== Species ==
There are currently six species of Podomonas.

- Podomonas capensis Cavalier-Smith 2010
- Podomonas gigantea (Mylnikov 1999) Cavalier-Smith 2010 [Amastigomonas gigantea Mylnikov 1999]
- Podomonas griebensis (Mylnikov 1999) Cavalier-Smith 2010 [Amastigomonas griebensis Mylnikov 1999]
- Podomonas kaiyoae Yabuki in Yabuki, Tame & Mizuno 2022
- Podomonas klosteris (Mylnikov 1999) Cavalier-Smith 2010 [Amastigomonas klosteris Mylnikov 1999]
- Podomonas magna Cavalier-Smith 2010
