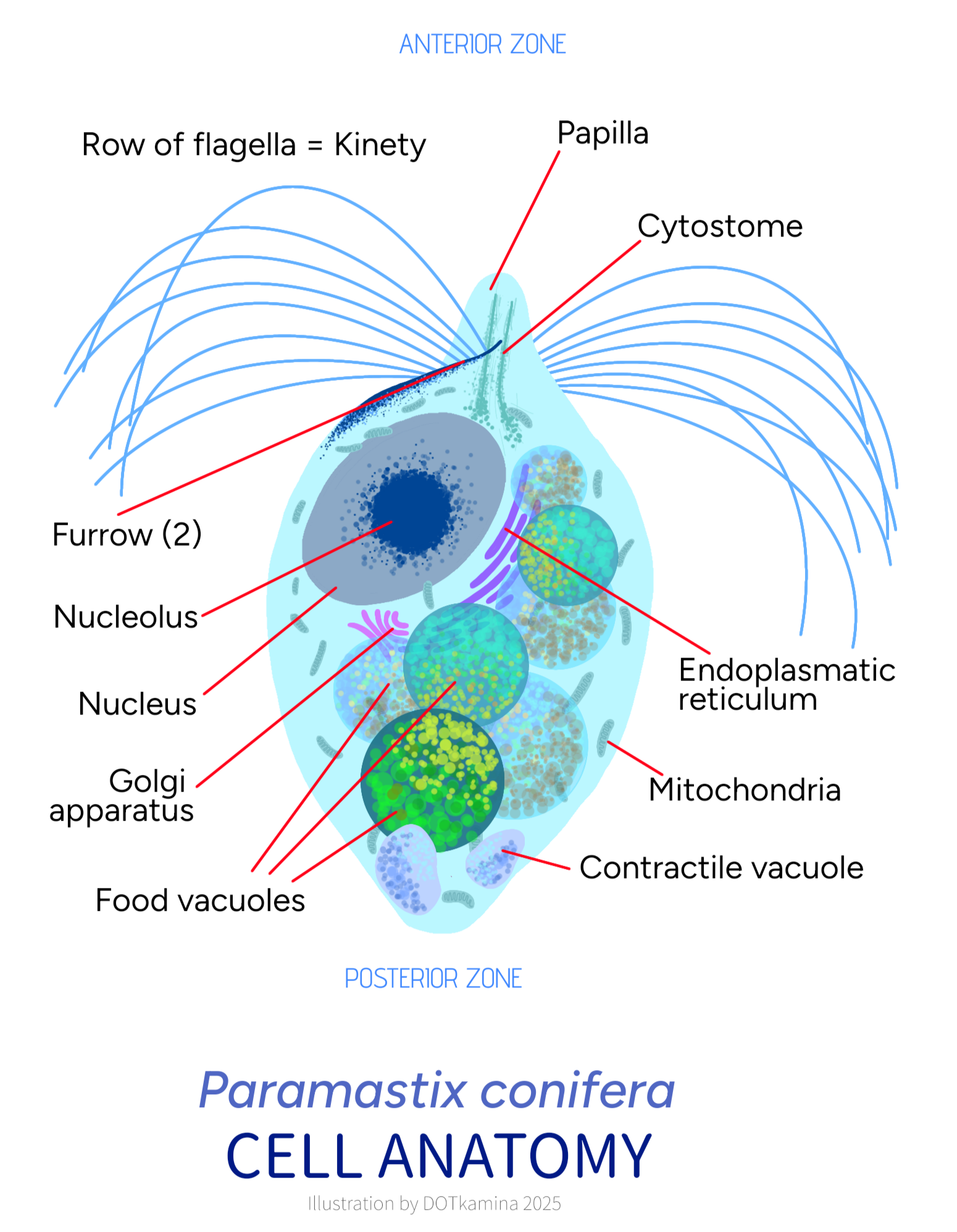

Scientific classification
- Domain: Eukaryota
- Clade: Disparia
- Phylum: Hemimastigophora
- Class: Hemimastigea
- Order: Hemimastigida
- Family: Paramastigidae; Skuja, 1948
- Genus: Paramastix; Skuja, 1948

= Paramastix =

Genus of single-celled organisms

Paramastix is a genus of Hemimastigophoran. It contains the species P. lata, P. minuta, P. conifera, and P. truncata.

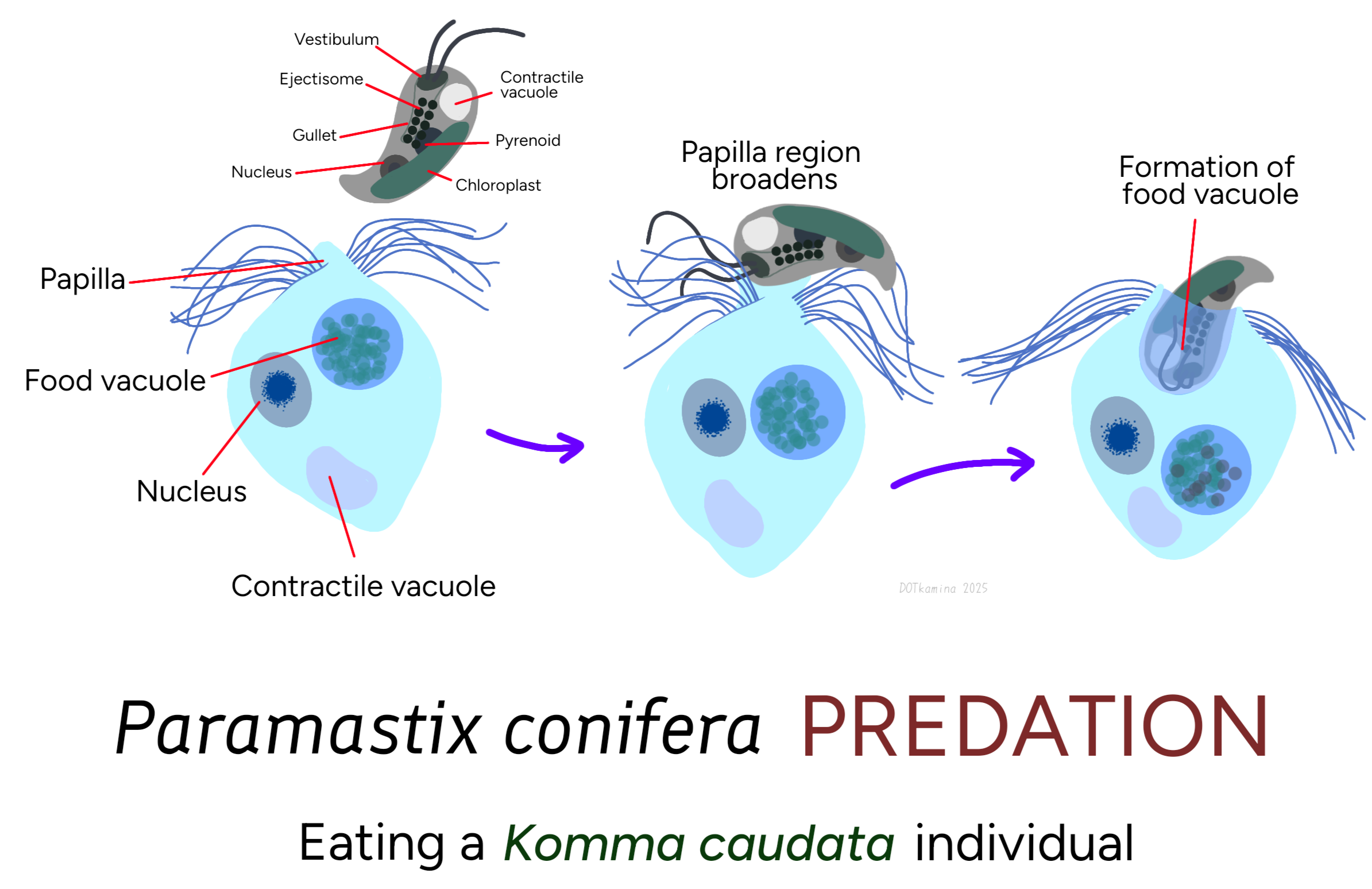
Mechanism of predation.

== Classification ==
This is the classification of members of Paramastix and their closest relatives:

- Family Spironematellidae Silva 1980 emend. Shɨshkin 2022 (=Spironemidae Doflein 1916)
  - Hemimastix Foissner, Blatterer & Foissner, 1988
    - H. amphikineta Foissner, Blatterer & Foissner, 1988
    - H. kukwesjijk Eglit & Simpson
  - Stereonema Foissner & Foissner 1993 non Kützing 1836
    - S. geiseri Foissner & Foissner 1993
  - Spironematella Silva 1970 emend. Shɨshkin 2022 (=Spironema Klebs 1893 non Vuillemin 1905 non Léger & Hesse 1922 non Rafinesque 1838 non Hochst. 1842 non Lindley 1840 non Meek 1864)
    - S. multiciliata (Klebs 1892) Silva 1970 (=Spironema multiciliatum Klebs 1893)
    - S. terricola (Foissner & Foissner 1993) Shɨshkin 2022 (=Spironema terricola Foissner & Foissner 1993)
    - S. goodeyi (Foissner & Foissner 1993) Shɨshkin 2022 (=Spironema goodeyi Foissner & Foissner 1993)
- Family Paramastigidae Skuja 1948 emend. Karpov 2012
  - Paramastix Skuja 1948
    - P. lata Skuja 1956
    - P. minuta Skuja 1964
    - P. conifera Skuja 1948
    - P. truncata Skuja 1948
