= Tremula vibrans =

Scientific classification
- Domain: Eukaryota
- Clade: Sar
- Clade: Rhizaria
- Phylum: Cercozoa
- Order: Tremulida
- Family: Tremulidae
- Genus: Tremula
- Species: T. vibrans

Binomial name
- Tremula vibrans (Sandon 1927) Cavalier-Smith in Howe et al. 2011

Synonyms
- Cercobodo vibrans Sandon 1927

Species of flagellate cercozoans

Tremula vibrans is a species of flagellate cercozoans.

== Characteristics ==
Tremula vibrans has a broader shape than Agitata agilis. Its body, which is 15 micrometers long, is sometimes quite spherical. It exhibits non-spiral, vibrating movements. In the amoeboid stage, it is generally with fine, and branched pseudopods are sometimes observed. It is similar to, but differs from Cercomonas in the greater distinctiveness of its amoeboid and "swimming" stages and the freedom of its posterior flagellum. In the flagellated state, short, finger-like pseudopods are frequently seen all over the body, but are most numerous at the posterior end. Sometimes a single broad pseudopod is observed in the amoeboid stage, but at other times it is usually surrounded by long, often branched, finger-like processes. The other species in Tremula is T. longifila. T. vibrans was placed in Tremula because the size of ATCC50530 — the type strain of T. longifila — as well as the position of its nucleus and contractile vacuole, are similar to those of T. vibrans, but there is one clear difference: T. longifila is never amoeboid. Another important difference is the position and length of its flagella. In T. vibrans, both flagella are attached to the anterior end. The anterior flagellum is slightly longer than the cell body, and the posterior flagellum is generally twice the length of the cell body. However, in ATCC50530, the posterior flagellum is attached to the middle of the cell, and both flagella are approximately three times the length of the cell body. In T. vibrans, there is sometimes a posterior flagellum that extends a short distance along the cell body and therefore appears to be inserted laterally. This rare condition appears to be the norm for T. longifila. Because of these similarities, they were placed in the same order. Since the diversity of cell shapes in T. longifila closely resembles the non-amoeboid form of T. vibrans, it seems illogical to place these two species in separate genera simply because T. longifila does not exhibit amoeboid behavior and has much longer flagella.

== Taxonomy ==
The species was described in 1927 by Sandon, and it was assigned to the now-obsolete genus Cercobodo. In 2011, Cavalier-Smith moved the species from Cercobodo to a new genus described by Howe and Cavalier-Smith in the same work; called Tremula, which also includes the species T. longifila. T. vibrans belongs to genus Tremula, family Tremulidae, order Tremulida and phylum Cercozoa.

== Phylogeny ==
Tremula is the sister group of Aquavolonida, which includes Aquavolon and Lapot.

- Tremulida
- Aquavolonida
