= Diphylleia =

Diphylleia is the genus name of:

- Diphylleia rotans, a protist described in 1920.
- Diphylleia (plant), an herb described in 1803.
