= Tremula =

Scientific classification
- Domain: Eukaryota
- Clade: Sar
- Clade: Rhizaria
- Phylum: Cercozoa
- Order: Tremulida; Howe & Cavalier-Smith in Howe et al. 2011
- Family: Tremulidae; Cavalier-Smith in Cavalier-Smith, Chao & Lewis 2018
- Genus: Tremula; Howe & Cavalier-Smith in Howe et al. 2011

Type species
- Tremula longifila Howe & Cavalier-Smith in Howe et al. 2011

Species
- T. longifila; T. vibrans

Synonyms
- Novel Clade 11 Bass et al. 2009

Genus of biflagellate cercozoans

Tremula is a genus of biflagellate cercozoans.

== Characteristics ==
The genus Tremula is a phagotrophic heterotroph biflagellate that possesses both anterior and posterior flagella. It glides along surfaces using its flagella, one pointing forward and the other backward. The theca, scales, and cytostome could not be identified using a light microscope. The anterior flagellum is attached to the anterior end of the cell but, unlike in Glissandra, is not embedded in a groove or notch. The posterior flagellum is attached on the ventral side or at the apical end, over a central depression or notch where the cell narrows. Vigorous trembling is frequently observed during movement. It can survive in dry soil. It sometimes possesses an amoeboid stage that protects both flagella. The word “tremulans,” from which its name is derived, refers to its trembling. The type species is Tremula longifila; another species is Tremula vibrans (=Cercobodo vibrans).

== Taxonomy ==
Tremula was described in 2011 by Howe and Cavalier-Smith in Howe et al., 2011 with two species: T. longifila and T. vibrans. It was assigned to its own order Tremulida, which was not assigned to any class in Filosa. Later, it was discovered that it does not belong to Filosa, and it was also assigned to its own family Tremulidae.

== Phylogeny ==
It is the sister group of Aquavolonida, which includes Aquavolon and Lapot.

- Tremulida
- Aquavolonida
