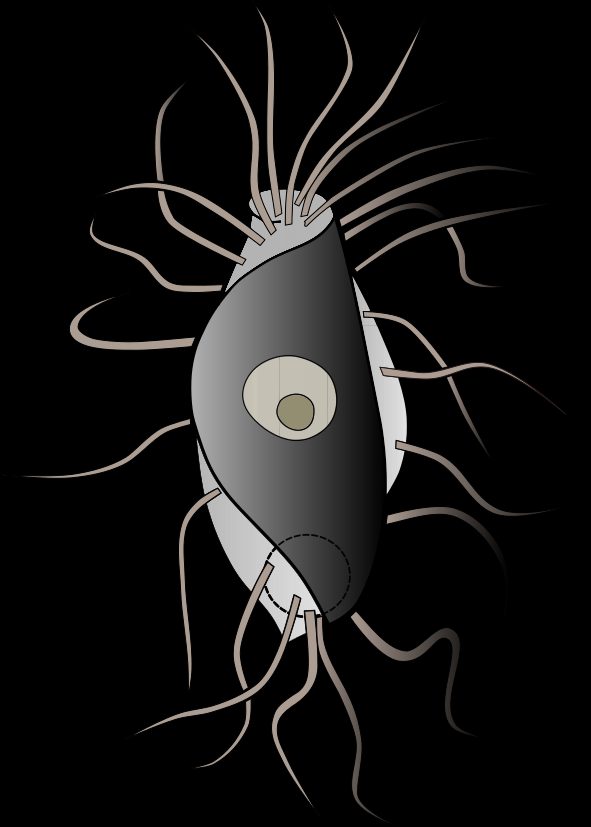
- Hemimastix amphikineta, redrawn from Foissner et al., 1988

Scientific classification
- Domain: Eukaryota
- Clade: Disparia
- Clade: Membrifera
- Phylum: Hemimastigophora; Foissner, Blatterer & Foissner 1988 sensu Cavalier-Smith 1993
- Class: Hemimastigea; Foissner, Blatterer & Foissner 1988
- Order: Hemimastigida; Foissner, Blatterer & Foissner 1988

Families
- Spironematellidae; Paramastigidae

Synonyms
- Spironematellozoa Doweld 2001

= Hemimastigophora =

Group of single-celled organisms

Hemimastigophora is a group of single-celled eukaryotic organisms including the Spironematellidae, first identified in 1988, and the Paramastigidae. Over the next 30 years, different authors proposed placing these organisms in various branches of the eukaryotes. In 2018 Lax et al. reported the first genetic information for Spironemidae, and suggest that they are from an ancient lineage of eukaryotes which constitute a separate clade from all other eukaryotic kingdoms. It may be related to the Telonemia.

== History of classification ==
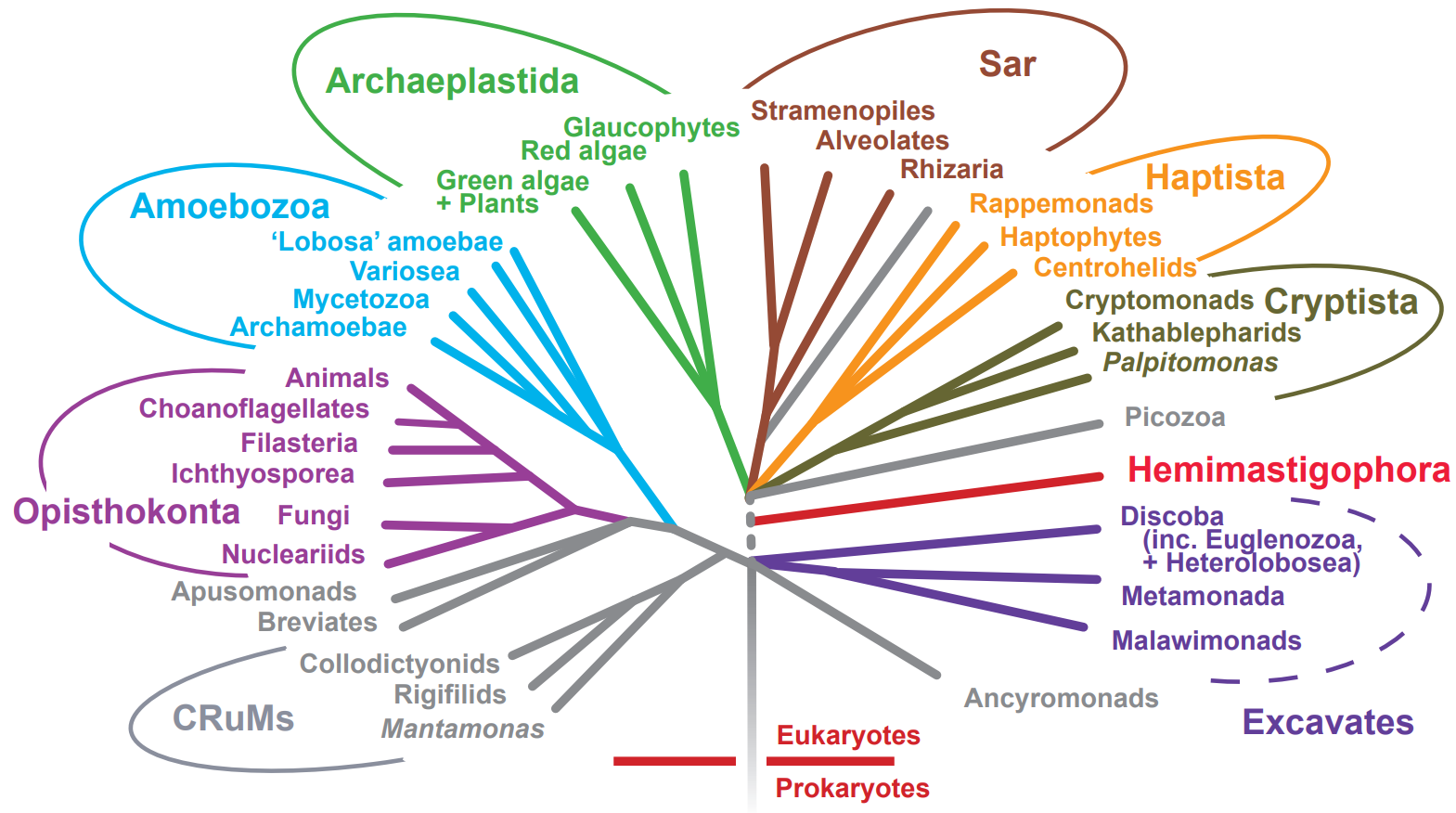
One hypothesis of eukaryotic relationships that classifies Hemimastigophora (red branch at right) as a supra-kingdom group.

Hemimastigophora was established in 1988 by Foissner et al., as a new phylum with a single family, Spironemidae. Its placement on the eukaryote tree of life was unclear, but the authors suggested that the structure of its pellicle and cell nucleus indicated a close relationship with Euglenozoa. For 30 years after the description of the group, no genetic information was available. During that time, researchers proposed that it should be classified in, or near, an assortment of other groups, including the alveolates, apusomonads, ancyromonads, and Rhizaria.

In an article published in 2018, Lax et al. announced that a new hemimastigophoran species, Hemimastix kukwesjijk, had been discovered in a Nova Scotian soil sample, and successfully cultivated in the laboratory. A second hemimastigophoran, a new species of Spironema, was found in the same sample. Phylogenomic analyses of the two organisms suggest that Hemimastigophora is a very ancient lineage, which diverged from the other eukaryotes at such an early date that the group should be classified at the supra-kingdom level.

The 2024 study revealed the enigmatic Meteora sporadica to be also related to Hemimastigophora.

== Classification ==
The hemimastigote classification, as of 2022:

- Family Spironematellidae Silva 1980 emend. Shɨshkin 2022 (=Spironemidae Doflein 1916)
  - Hemimastix Foissner, Blatterer & Foissner, 1988
    - H. amphikineta Foissner, Blatterer & Foissner, 1988
    - H. kukwesjijk Eglit & Simpson, 2018
  - Stereonema Foissner & Foissner 1993 non Kützing 1836
    - S. geiseri Foissner & Foissner 1993
  - Spironematella Silva 1970 emend. Shɨshkin 2022 (=Spironema Klebs 1893 non Vuillemin 1905 non Léger & Hesse 1922 non Rafinesque 1838 non Hochst. 1842 non Lindley 1840 non Meek 1864)
    - S. multiciliata (Klebs 1892) Silva 1970 (=Spironema multiciliatum Klebs 1893)
    - S. terricola (Foissner & Foissner 1993) Shɨshkin 2022 (=Spironema terricola Foissner & Foissner 1993)
    - S. goodeyi (Foissner & Foissner 1993) Shɨshkin 2022 (=Spironema goodeyi Foissner & Foissner 1993)
- Family Paramastigidae Skuja 1948 emend. Karpov 2012
  - Paramastix Skuja 1948
    - P. lata Skuja 1956
    - P. minuta Skuja 1964
    - P. conifera Skuja 1948
    - P. truncata Skuja 1948
