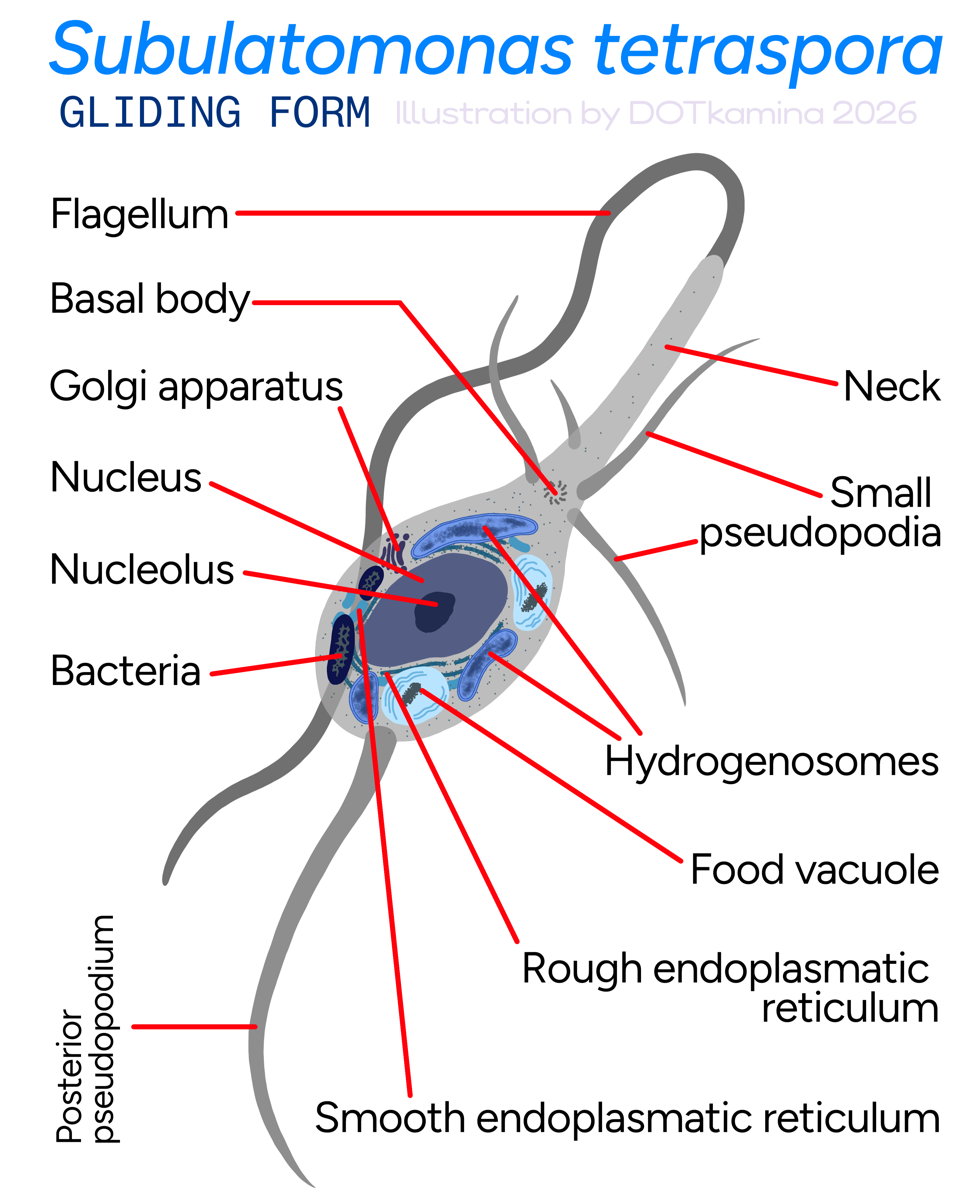

Scientific classification
- Domain: Eukaryota
- Clade: Obazoa
- Class: Breviatea
- Order: Breviatida
- Family: Breviatidae
- Genus: Subulatomonas; L.Katz, J.Grant, L.W.Parfrey, A.Gant, C.O'Kelly, O.R.Anderson, R.E.Molestina & T.Nerad
- Species: S. tetraspora

Binomial name
- Subulatomonas tetraspora L.Katz, J.Grant, L.W.Parfrey, A.Gant, C.O'Kelly, O.R.Anderson, R.E.Molestina & T.Nerad

= Subulatomonas =

Species of amoeba

Subulatomonas tetraspora is a species of free living amoebae belonging to the genus Subulatomonas, which in turn, belongs to the family Breviatidae. They likely do not possess vinculin proteins. Their metabolism relies on fermentative production of ATP as an adaptation to their low-oxygen environment.

== Description ==
Subulatomonas tetraspora is an amoeboflagellate with an awl-shaped body. and a distinctive, dynamic neck that extends along its single flagellum. It is capable of both swimming and gliding. Gliding involves the extension of small pseudopodia from the neck and often a long pseudopod trailing from the rear. Flagellates typically measure 5-10 μm long and 3-5 μm wide, with a flagellum 6-12 μm long and a neck about 6 μm long. when attached, it can form long filose pseudopodia up to 30 μm long from various parts of its body, and the flagellum appears to be reabsorbed. S. tetraspora forms cysts that are 4-6 μm in diameter and usually appear in groups of four.

== Distribution ==
Its habitat is off the coast of Plymouth, Massachusetts, mainly found in near-shore sediments.

== Taxonomy ==
Subulatomonas tetraspora is closely related to Breviata anathema sharing some morphological similarities and a close genetic relationship, It is recognized as part of a novel major eukaryotic clade, distinct from established groups like Opisthokonta, Excavata, Amoebozoa, and SAR, Mitochondrion-related organelles (MROs) are also found in Subulatomonas tetraspora.

== Morphology ==
The cell surface is "naked", lacking a detectable glycocalyx.

== Significance ==
It is a part of a new clade of eukaryotes.
