= Mantamonas vickermani =

Scientific classification
- Domain: Eukaryota
- Clade: CRuMs
- Class: Glissodiscea
- Order: Mantamonadida
- Family: Mantamonadidae
- Genus: Mantamonas
- Species: M. vickermani

Binomial name
- Mantamonas vickermani Blaz et al. 2021

Species of marine protist

Mantamonas vickermani is a species of marine heterotrophic flagellates described in 2021. It belongs to the Mantamonadida, a basal eukaryotic lineage within a clade known as CRuMs.

== Description ==
Like other Mantamonas species, M. vickermani are heterotrophic unicellular protists with one anterior and one posterior flagellum in each cell. The transcriptome of Mantamonas vickermani is estimated to be 21 megabases long, with 9,561 unique proteins.

== Ecology ==
Mantamonas vickermani was isolated from a marine sediment sample collected in 2014 from the shallow marine lagoon Malo jezero (Mljet), in the Mljet National Park on the island of Mljet, Croatia.
