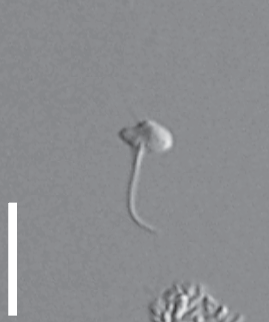
- M. sphyraenae differential interference contrast image. Scale bar: 10 μm.

Scientific classification
- Domain: Eukaryota
- Supergroup: CRuMs
- Class: Glissodiscea; Cavalier-Smith 2013, emend. 2022
- Order: Mantamonadida; Cavalier-Smith 2011
- Family: Mantamonadidae; Cavalier-Smith 2011
- Genus: Mantamonas; Cavalier-Smith & Glücksman 2011

Type species
- Mantamonas plastica Glücksman & Cavalier-Smith 2011

Species
- M. plastica; M. sphyraenae; M. vickermani

Diversity
- 3 species

= Mantamonas =

Group of protists

Mantamonads are a group of free-living heterotrophic flagellates that move primarily by gliding on surfaces (rather than swimming). They are classified as one genus Mantamonas in the monotypic family Mantamonadidae, order Mantamonadida and class Glissodiscea. Previously, they were classified in Apusozoa as sister of the Apusomonadida on the basis of rRNA analyses. However, mantamonads are currently placed in CRuMs on the basis of phylogenomic analyses that identify their closest relatives as the Diphylleida and Rigifilida.

== Morphology ==
Mantamonas are heterotrophic unicellular protists. Their cells are flattened, relatively plastic and asymmetric. They have one thin anterior flagellum and one conspicuous posterior flagellum, on which they glide. The cells have a right hump, likely caused by the nucleus, and a blunt projection on the left side. They are typically 2 μm thick, 5 μm long and 5 μm wide, but vary in size and shape depending on their growth phase and the bacterial density in the medium. When wide-shaped, they present lateral "wings" that resemble the fins of a manta ray (hence the name Mantamonas).

== Ecology ==
Mantamonas are marine gliding heterotrophic flagellates. M. plastica was isolated from marine sediments, while M. vickermani was isolated from marine lagoon sediments. M. sphyraenae was obtained from the skin surface of a barracuda, suggesting that it could be an epizootic species.

== Evolution ==
When discovered in 2011, a phylogenetic analysis based on 28S and 18S rRNA recovered Mantamonas as a lineage closely related to Planomonadida and Apusomonadida, within the paraphyletic Apusozoa. Later in 2018, a phylogenomic analysis recovered Mantamonas as the sister group of a clade comprising Collodictyonidae and Rigifilida. Together, the three groups compose the CRuMs clade, which is the sister group to Amorphea (Amoebozoa + Obazoa) in a clade known as Podiata.

- Eukaryota
  - Diaphoretickes
  - Discoba
  - Metamonada
  - - Ancyromonadida
    - - Malawimonadea
      - Podiata
        - Amorphea
          - Amoebozoa
          - Obazoa
            - Breviatea
            - - Apusomonadida
              - Opisthokonta
        - CRuMs
          - - Mantamonadida
              - Mantamonas sphyraenae
              - - Mantamonas plastica
                - Mantamonas vickermani
          - - Rigifilida
            - Diphylleida

== Species ==
There are currently three species of Mantamonas.

- Mantamonas plastica Glücksman & Cavalier-Smith 2011
- Mantamonas sphyraenae Blaz et al. 2021
- Mantamonas vickermani Blaz et al. 2021
