= Mantamonas plastica =

Scientific classification
- Domain: Eukaryota
- Clade: CRuMs
- Class: Glissodiscea
- Order: Mantamonadida
- Family: Mantamonadidae
- Genus: Mantamonas
- Species: M. plastica

Binomial name
- Mantamonas plastica Cavalier-Smith 2011

Type strain
- CCAP 1946/1

Species of marine protist

Mantamonas plastica is a species of marine heterotrophic biflagellates described in 2011. It is the type species of the Mantamonadida, a basal eukaryotic lineage within a clade known as CRuMs.

== Morphology ==
Mantamonas plastica is a species of heterotrophic unicellular protists. Their cells are flattened, relatively plastic (hence the name plastica) and asymmetric. They have a thin anterior flagellum and a conspicuous posterior flagellum, on which they glide. The cells have a right hump, likely caused by the nucleus, and a blunt projection on the left side. They are typically 2 μm thick, 5 μm long and 5 μm wide, but vary in size and shape depending on their growth phase and the bacterial density in the medium. Being the type species of the genus, almost all of its morphological characteristics apply to the other species of Mantamonas.

== Ecology ==
Mantamonas plastica was collected in 2011 from coastal sediment on Cumbria, England. They are bacterivorous: they feed on bacteria through pseudopodia.
