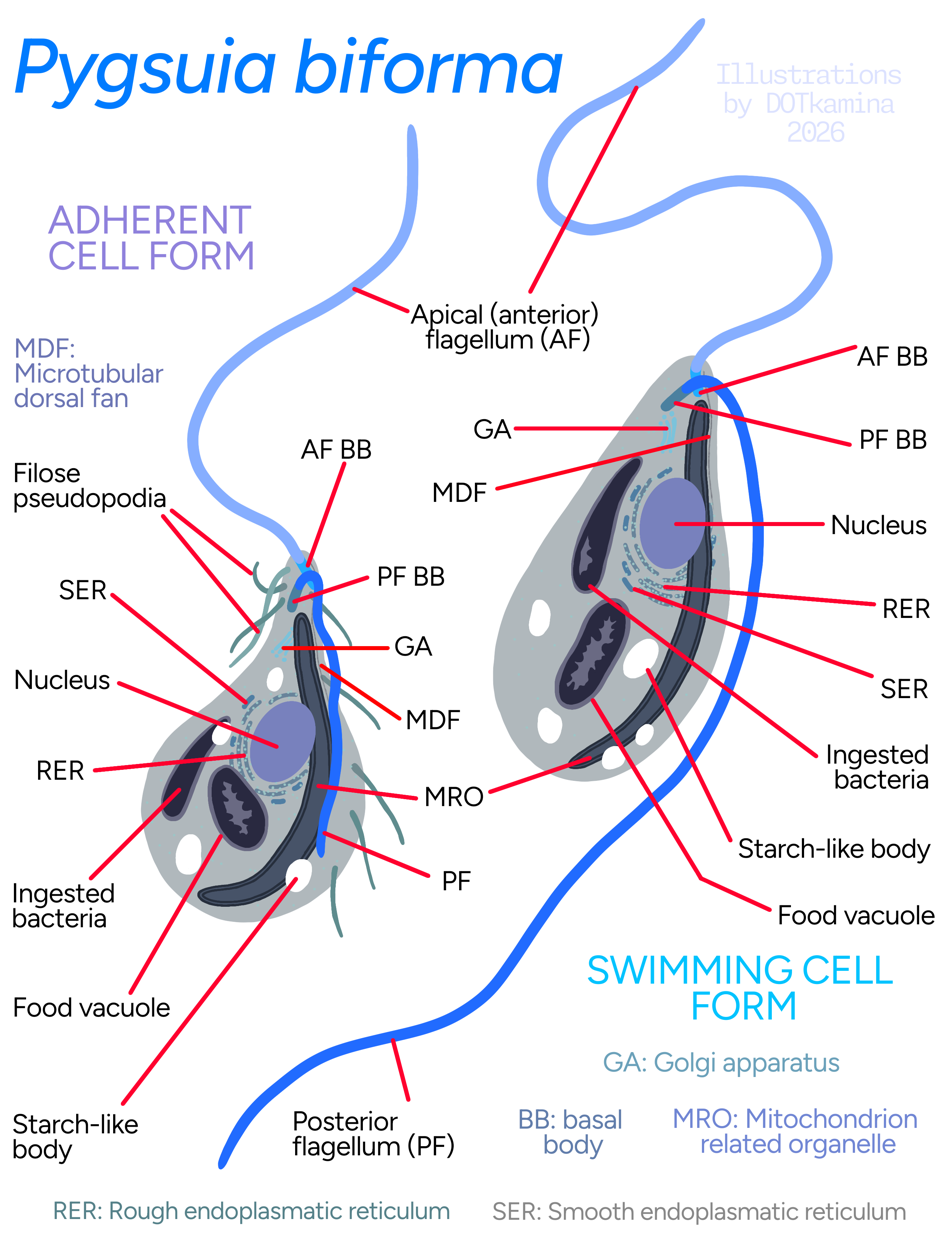

Scientific classification
- Domain: Eukaryota
- Clade: Obazoa
- Class: Breviatea
- Order: Breviatida
- Family: Pygsuidae
- Genus: Pygsuia; Brown et al., 2013
- Species: P. biforma

Binomial name
- Pygsuia biforma Brown et al., 2013

= Pygsuia =

Genus of protist

Pygsuia is a genus in the clade of Breviatea, which are basal eukaryotes. This genus contains only one species, Pygsuia biforma, which is known for its long flagella compared to other breviates.

== Etymology ==
The genus name, Pygsuia, is derived from a part of the University of Arkansas Razorbacks sports cheer, which goes "Wooo Pig Sooie". This is because the species has a row of structures similar to those of actual razorbacks. "Pyg" in the genus name refers to pigs while also referencing the Latin term Pygmae, as a nod to the organisms' small size. "Sui" in the genus name refers to the sound made by hog callers. As a consequence, the full genus name means "little pig" in mock Latin.
