= Micronuclearia =

Scientific classification
- Domain: Eukaryota
- Clade: CRuMs
- Class: Hilomonadea
- Order: Rigifilida
- Family: Micronucleariidae; Cavalier-Smith 2008
- Genus: Micronuclearia; Mikrjukov and Mylnikov 2001

Type species
- Micronuclearia podoventralis Mikrjukov & Mylnikov 2001

Species
- M. podoventralis

Genus of protozoans

Micronuclearia is a genus of free-living protozoa containing the single species Micronuclearia podoventralis. While originally thought to be a nucleariid, as reflected in the name, it is now inferred to be a member of the taxon Rigifilida, and to belong to the 'CRuMs' assemblage (whereas nucleariids are opisthokonts).
