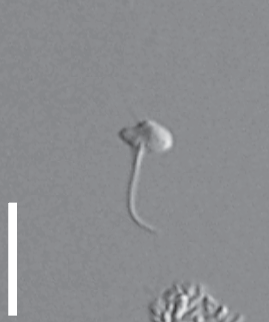
- M. sphyraenae differential interference contrast image. Scale bar: 10 μm.

Scientific classification
- Domain: Eukaryota
- Clade: CRuMs
- Class: Glissodiscea
- Order: Mantamonadida
- Family: Mantamonadidae
- Genus: Mantamonas
- Species: M. sphyraenae

Binomial name
- Mantamonas sphyraenae Blaz et al. 2021

= Mantamonas sphyraenae =

Species of marine protist

Mantamonas sphyraenae is a species of marine heterotrophic flagellates described in 2021. It belongs to the Mantamonadida, a basal eukaryotic lineage within a clade known as CRuMs. Its diploid genome is the first to be assembled within the CRuMs group.

== Description ==
Like other Mantamonas species, M. sphyraenae are heterotrophic unicellular protists with one anterior and one posterior flagellum in each cell.

The genome of Mantamonas sphyraenae is estimated to be 25 megabases long, with 9,416 predicted protein-coding genes. Analyses estimate a diploid genome of 66 pairs of chromosomes in the nucleus of M. sphyraenae cells. It is the first genome assembled within the CRuMs clade.

Mantamonas sphyraenae is notable for having the most gene-rich mitochondria genome outside of the jakobids, having a total of 91 genes, 62 of which are protein-coding.

== Ecology ==
Mantamonas sphyraenae was collected in 2013 from the surface of a barracuda in a lagoon on Iriomote Island, in Taketomi, Japan. It has been suggested that either the species is epizootic, or it adhered to the fish skin by chance.
