= Årungen =

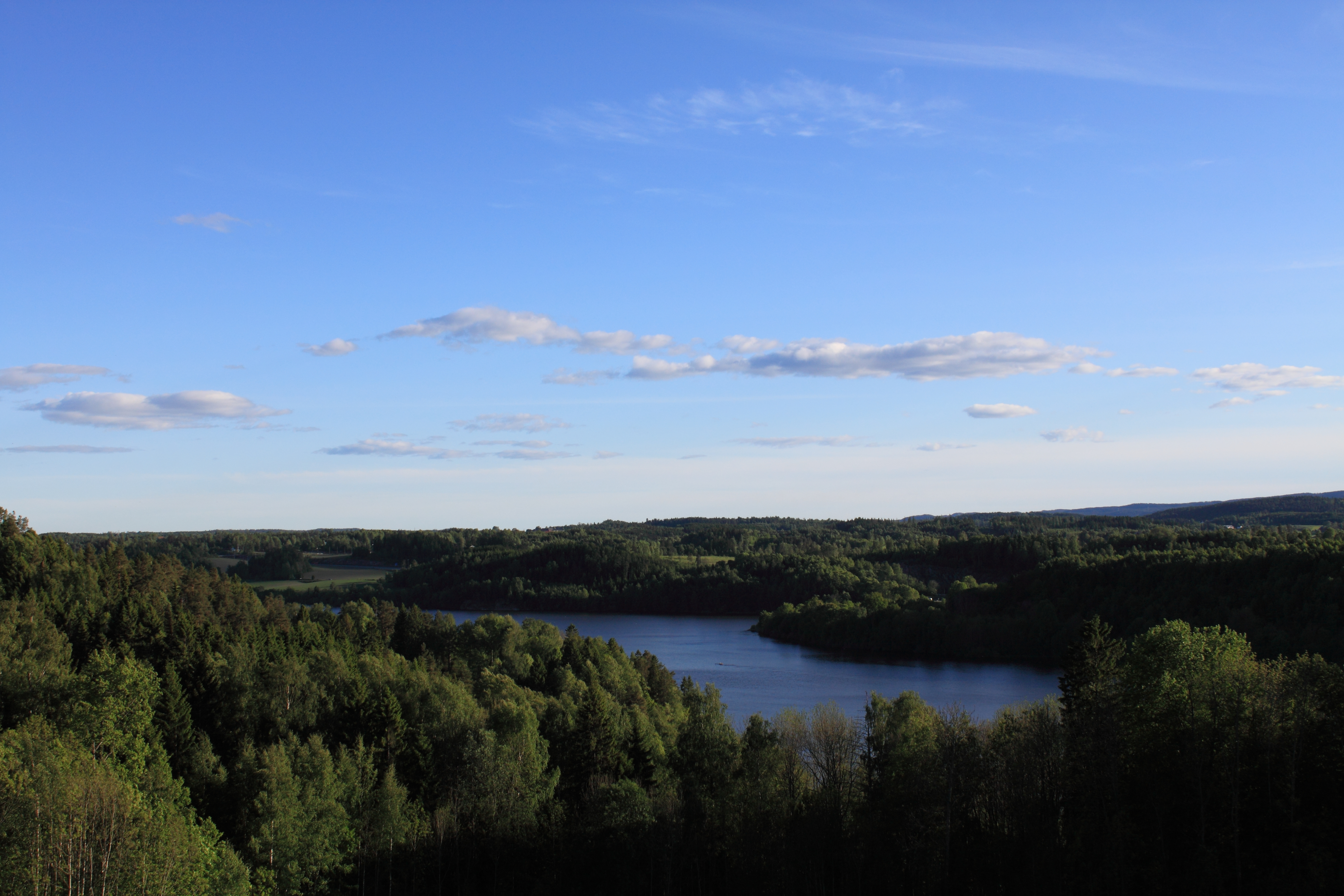
- Årungen

- Location within Norway
- Location: Norway
- Coordinates: 59°41′20″N 10°44′45″E
- Type: lake
- Surface area: 1.2 square kilometres (0.46 sq mi)
- Surface elevation: 33 metres (108 ft)

Årungen is a lake in Norway in the municipality of Ås about 18 miles (29 km) south of Oslo which is notable for being an environment containing microscopic creatures called collodictyons. Norwegian scientists have been studying the creatures for two decades and speculate that they may be one of the oldest known organisms, and may provide clues about the origins of life. One kilometre south of the lake lies the Norwegian University of Life Sciences.

The lake's elevation is 33 metres (108 ft) and it straddles both Ås and Frogn municipalities of Akershus county. The surface area is 1.2 square kilometres (0.46 sq mi). Its drainage basin is Østensjøvannet (a small lake in the east) and a number of minor streams. It drains into Årungselva river northward to Bunnefjorden. The eastern shore of the lake has been adapted with strolling paths and picnic areas.

The water is shallow and rich with nutrients, and inflow from agriculture annually causes blooms of toxic blue-green algae. Nevertheless the lake is rich in fish life, with northern pike, European perch, Common Roach and European eel. The water quality has improved in recent years. The wetlands in the southern end is an important part of the local fauna and flora.

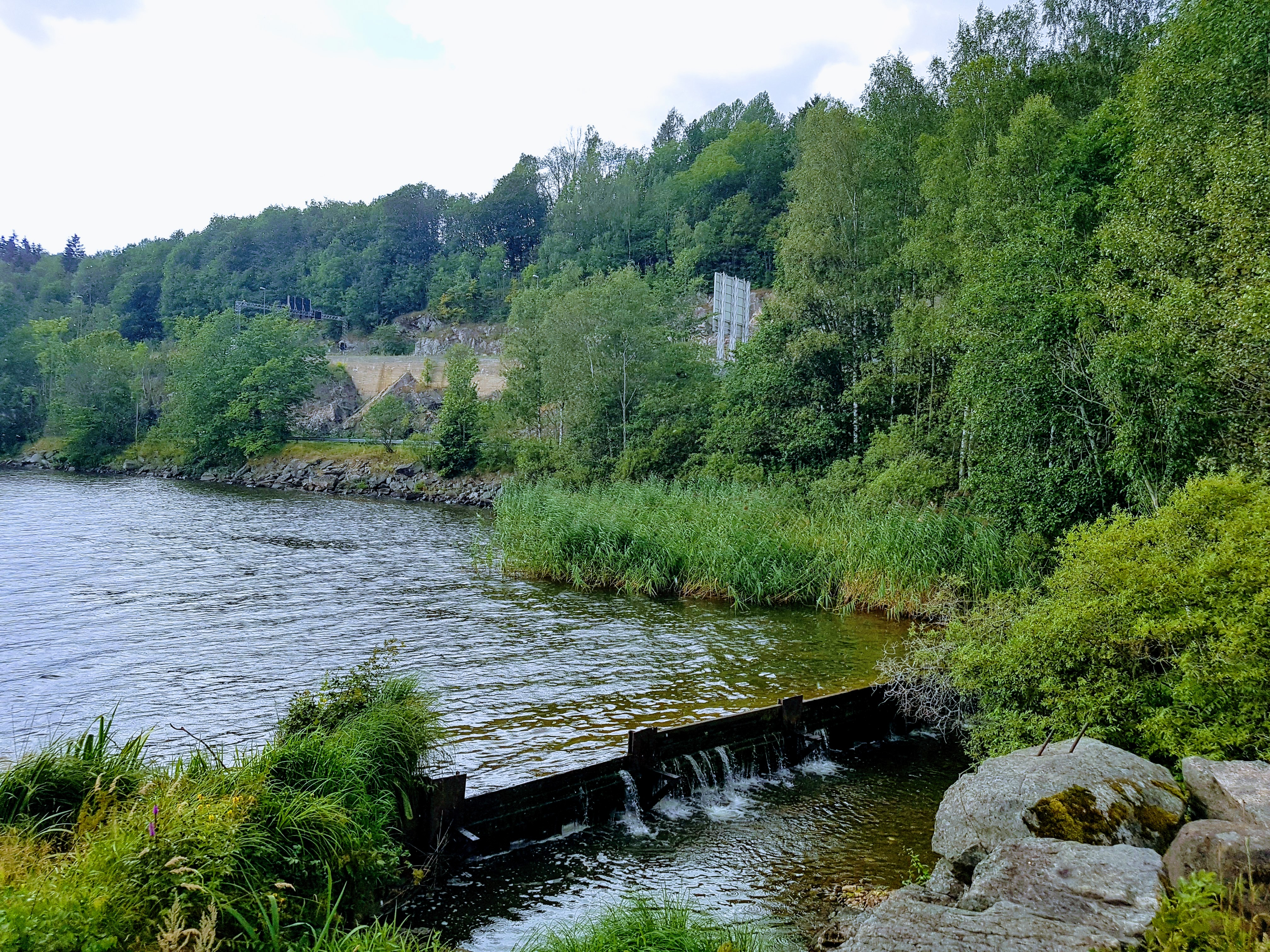
Årungen lake viewed from north-west

Årungen is also home to the Norwegian national center for rowing and paddling. Årungen was host to the 1993 World Rowing Junior Championships.

== The name ==
The first part of the name could derive from Old Norse: ǫlr (meaning alder), which would make the name signify 'the lake where alder grows around it'. The last element -ungen (Norse -ungr) is a common suffix in names of lakes in Norway, for instance Sandungen ('the lake with sand') and Øyungen ('the lake with islands').
