= Thecamonadinae =

Scientific classification
- Domain: Eukaryota
- Clade: Obazoa
- Class: Thecomonadea
- Order: Apusomonadida
- Family: Apusomonadidae
- Subfamily: Thecamonadinae; Larsen & Patterson 1990 stat. n. Heiss et al. 2015

Type genus
- Thecamonas Larsen & Patterson 1990

Genera
- Chelonemonas; Thecamonas

Synonyms
- Thecamonadidae Larsen & Patterson 1990

Subfamily of flagellates

Thecamonadinae is a subfamily of heterotrophic protists. It is a monophyletic group, or clade, of apusomonads, a group of protozoa with two flagella closely related to the eukaryotic supergroup Opisthokonta. The subfamily contains two genera Chelonemonas and Thecamonas, which are found in marine habitats.

== Morphology ==
Thecamonadinae are unicellular eukaryotes, exhibiting cells smaller than 10 μm, and an "Amastigomonas-type" cell body shape: plastic, oval to oblong, with a prominent proboscis that measures around ¼ of the cell body length. They have a rigid "tusk" of between 200 and 250 nm in diameter, that arises to the right of the anterior flagellum and extends around 0.5–1.0 μm. This tusk can be visible under optimal conditions of light microscopy. Aside from the flagella, they often present thin pseudopodia trailing behind the moving cell.

== Systematics ==
=== History of taxonomy ===
Thecamonadinae was initially a family-level taxon, Thecamonadidae, described in 1990 by Jacob Larsen and David J. Patterson. At the time, it was composed exclusively of the genus Thecamonas, described by the same authors. Members of this family were characterized by a mobile anterior "snout" (or "tusk"), which is superficially resembling of the flagellate Rhynchomonas. However, their ultrastructure resembled Apusomonas in the pliable dorsal theca. Posterior phylogenetic analyses showed that this family branched within Apusomonadidae, and the taxon fell out of use. In 2015, Aaron A. Heiss and collaborators co-opted this taxon as a subfamily within Apusomonadidae to designate the clade uniting Chelonemonas and Thecamonas. This clade is supported by multiple phylogenetic analyses and accepted as a valid taxon.

=== Classification ===
As of 2022, the subfamily contains two genera, Chelonemonas and Thecamonas, and a total of 7 species.

- Chelonemonas Heiss, Lee, Ishida & Simpson, 2015

- C. dolani Torruella, Galindo et al., 2022
- C. geobuk Heiss, Lee, Ishida & Simpson, 2015
- C. masanensis Heiss, Lee, Ishida & Simpson, 2015

- Thecamonas Larsen & Patterson 1990

- T. filosa Larsen & Patterson, 1990
  = Amastigomonas filosa (Larsen & Patterson, 1990) Molina & Nerad, 1991
- T. muscula (Mylnikov, 1999) Cavalier-Smith, 2010
  = Amastigomonas muscula Mylnikov, 1999
- T. mutabilis (Griessmann, 1913) Larsen & Patterson, 1990
  = Rhynchomonas mutabilis Griessmann 1913
  = Amastigomonas mutabilis (Griessmann, 1913) Patterson & Zölffel, 1993
- T. trahens Larsen & Patterson, 1990
  = Amastigomonas trahens (Larsen & Patterson, 1990) Molina & Nerad, 1991
