= Lenisia =

Scientific classification
- Domain: Eukaryota
- Clade: Obazoa
- Class: Breviatea
- Order: Breviatida
- Genus: Lenisia; Hamann et al., 2016
- Species: L. limosa

Binomial name
- Lenisia limosa Hamann et al., 2016

Species of breviate

Lenisia limosa is a species, belonging to the Breviatea group which is currently placed within the Obazoa clade. The Lenisia genus contains only one species. Lenisia limosa was first discovered in 2016, where it was obtained from a tidal flat in the Wadden Sea.

Lenisia limosa had been noted for its mutualistic interactions with Arcobacter sp., a finding seen in a multitude of breviates.
