= Diphylleia rotans =

Scientific classification
- Domain: Eukaryota
- Clade: CRuMs
- Class: Diphyllatea
- Order: Diphylleida
- Family: Collodictyonidae
- Genus: Diphylleia; Massart 1920 non Michaux 1803
- Species: D. rotans

Binomial name
- Diphylleia rotans J.Massart 1920

Synonyms
- Aulacomonas submarina Skuja 1939

Species of protist

Diphylleia rotans is a eukaryotic microorganism. It is notable for having a gene-rich mitochondrial genome, the largest known outside the jakobids.
