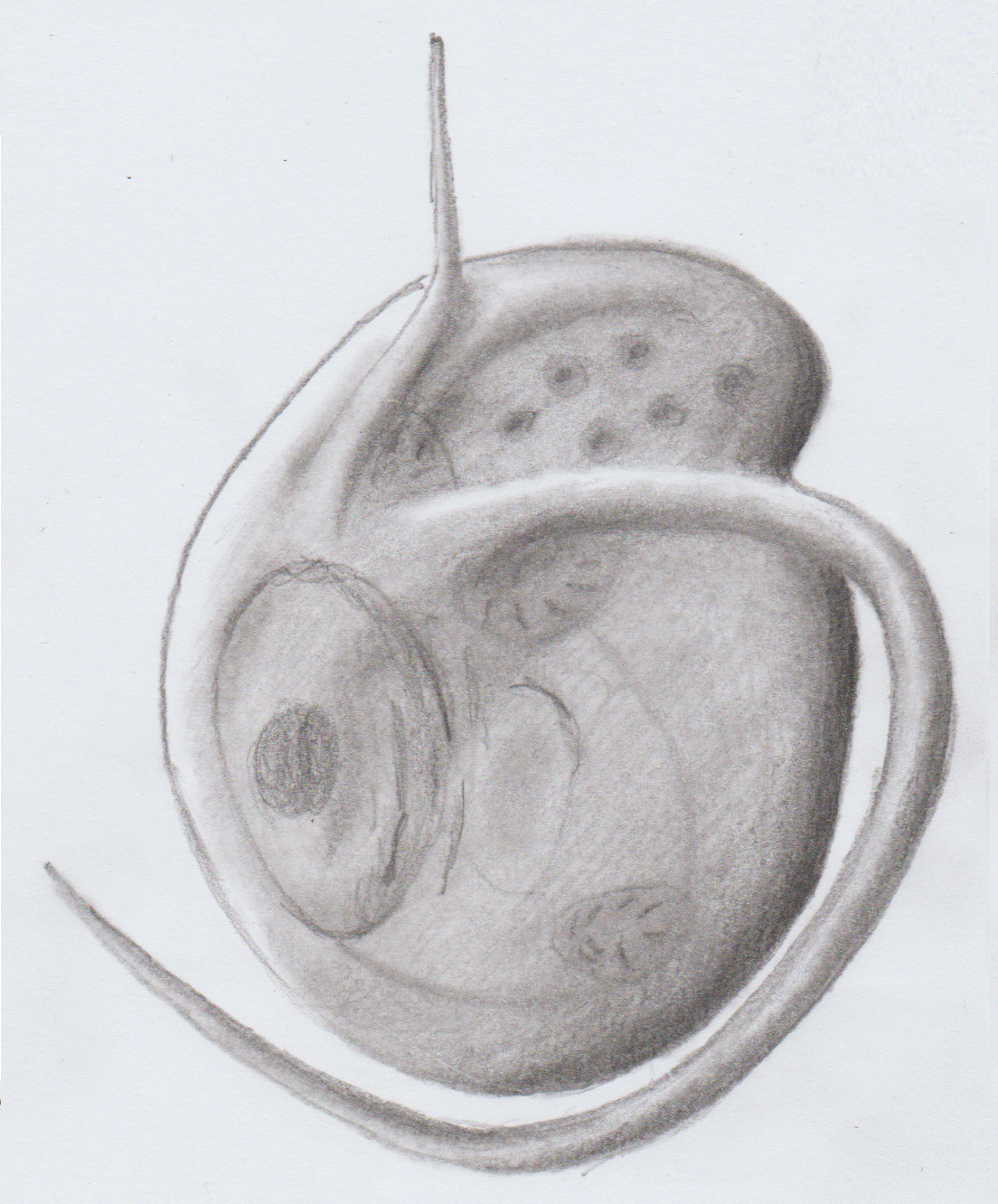
- Ancyromonas sp.

Scientific classification
- Domain: Eukaryota
- Class: Planomonadea
- Order: Ancyromonadida
- Family: Ancyromonadidae
- Genus: Ancyromonas; Kent 1880

Type species
- Ancyromonas sigmoides Kent, 1880

Species
- See text

Synonyms
- Phyllomonas Klebs 1892

= Ancyromonas =

Genus of protists

Ancyromonas is a genus of basal eukaryote consisting of heterotrophic flagellates.

It includes the species Ancyromonas sigmoides, first described by Saville Kent in 1880. The genus was rediscovered in modern times by Hänel in 1979.

They are about 5 μm long and live in both marine and freshwater habitats with a global distribution.

In 2008, Cavalier-Smith et al. proposed the reassignment of all known species of Ancyromonas into a new genus, Planomonas. Planomonas has since been described as a junior synonym of Ancyromonas. Ancyromonas does not belong to any of the eukaryotic supergroups, and they appear more basal than Malawimonas, placing them in Loukouzoa, possibly relatives of podiates, and depending on the placement of the root position of the Eukaryotes.

== Taxonomy ==
Species of Ancyromonas:

- Ancyromonas abrupta Skvortzov 1957
- Ancyromonas atlantica Glücksman & Cavalier-Smith 2013
- Ancyromonas contorta (Klebs 1883) Lemmermann 1914 [Phyllomonas contorta Klebs 1883]
- Ancyromonas impluvium Lee 2015
- Ancyromonas indica Glücksman & Cavalier-Smith 2013
- Ancyromonas kenti Glücksman & Cavalier-Smith 2013
- Ancyromonas lata Skvortzov 1957
- Ancyromonas magna Zhang & Yang 1993
- Ancyromonas metabolica Skvortzov 1957
- Ancyromonas minuta Skvortzov 1958
- Ancyromonas nitzschiae Skvortzov 1957
- Ancyromonas parasitica Massart
- Ancyromonas prima Skvortzov1957
- Ancyromonas rotundata Skvortzov 1957
- Ancyromonas rugosa Skvortzov 1957
- Ancyromonas sigmoides Kent 1880 sensu Heiss, Walker & Simpson 2010 [Planomonas mylnikovi Cavalier-Smith 2008]
- Ancyromonas sinistra Al-Qassab et al. 2002 [Planomonas sinistra (Al-Qassab et al. 2002) Cavalier-Smith 2008]
- Ancyromonas socialis Skvortzov 1957
