= Tremula longifila =

Scientific classification
- Domain: Eukaryota
- Clade: Sar
- Clade: Rhizaria
- Phylum: Cercozoa
- Order: Tremulida
- Family: Tremulidae
- Genus: Tremula
- Species: T. longifila

Binomial name
- Tremula longifila Howe & Cavalier-Smith in Howe et al. 2011

Type strain
- ATCC50530

Species of flagellate cercozoans

Tremula longifila is a species of flagellate cercozoans.

== Characteristics ==
The posterior flagellum and the active anterior flagellum of Tremula longifila are 40–45 micrometers long; they are heterodynamic and flicker with rapid waves along their entire length. There is a passive posterior flagellum that attaches the cell to the substrate and anchors it. The posterior flagellum emerges from a notch in the center of the ventral side, and the anterior flagellum emerges from the tip of the cell. It has a round cell body, and its anterior and posterior ends are somewhat needle-like and may be long or pointed; there is a mid-notch of varying prominence. The substrate is aligned with the flagella and the cell, which vibrates during gliding. Cell vibrations are transmitted along the posterior flagellum, and the anterior flagellum flickers independently. Occasionally, the cell rises above the substrate, anchors itself with the posterior flagellum, and oscillates at a range from slow to very fast. Moving cells are commonly observed, but they frequently pause to pivot, vibrate, or twirl in place. No pseudopods are present. The nucleus is usually central, and the contractile vacuole is located in the posterior half of the cell, though an anterior contractile vacuole is sometimes visible. No cysts have been observed; those observed by ATCC may belong to the stramenopile prey Adriamonas. However, it has grown well only on Volvic and grain, which suggests that it may feed on bacteria instead. Etymology: “Longus” means “long” and “filum” means “thread.” A strain with the same 18S rDNA and ITS1 sequences was also isolated from Beaver Creek, Montezuma Castle Monument, Arizona, and the United States by KV.

== Taxonomy ==
T. longifila belongs to genus Tremula, family Tremulidae, order Tremulida and phylum Cercozoa.

== Phylogeny ==
Tremula is the sister group of Aquavolonida, which includes Aquavolon and Lapot.

- Tremulida
- Aquavolonida
