= Chelonemonas =

Scientific classification
- Domain: Eukaryota
- Class: Thecomonadea
- Order: Apusomonadida
- Family: Apusomonadidae
- Subfamily: Thecamonadinae
- Genus: Chelonemonas; Heiss, Lee, Ishida & Simpson, 2015

Type species
- Chelonemonas masanensis Heiss, Lee, Ishida & Simpson, 2015

Species
- C. masanensis; C. geobuk; C. dolani

Genus of flagellates

Chelonemonas (from Greek chelone 'turtle' and monas 'monad, unicellular organism') is a genus of heterotrophic protists. They are unicellular eukaryotes with two flagella, characterized by the presence of a honeycomb or turtle shell pattern on the dorsal surface of their cells that is visible under electron microscopy. They belong to the Apusomonadida, a clade of flagellates related to the opisthokonts, the group containing animals, fungi and their closest protist relatives.

Chelonemonas was described in 2015, along with its type species C. masanensis and C. geobuk. In 2022, a new species C. dolani was described.
