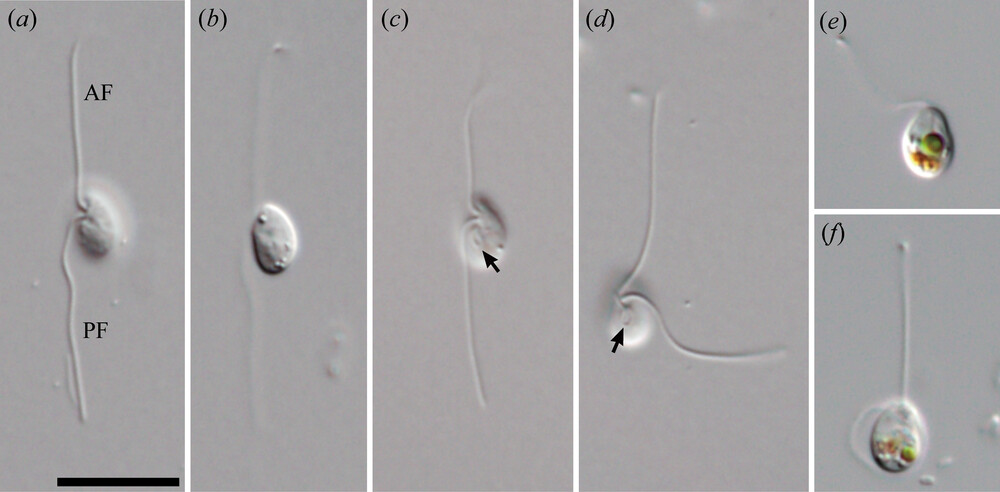
- Differential interference contrast micrographs of Glissandra oviformis

Scientific classification
- Domain: Eukaryota
- Clade: CRuMs
- Order: Glissandrida; Yazaki et al. 2025
- Family: Glissandridae; Yazaki et al. 2025
- Genus: Glissandra; Patterson & Simpson 1996

Type species
- Glissandra innuerende Patterson & Simpson 1996

Other species
- Glissandra similis Lee 2006; Glissandra oviformis Yazaki et al. 2025

= Glissandra =

Genus of protists

Glissandra is a genus of heterotrophic gliding biflagellate protists. It belongs to the monotypic family Glissandridae and monotypic order Glissandrida. It contains three species; the type species Glissandra innuerende, Glissandra similis and Glissandra oviformis.

== Phylogeny ==
- CRuMs
  - Mantamonadida
  - - Glissandrida
    - - Rigifilida
      - Diphylleida
