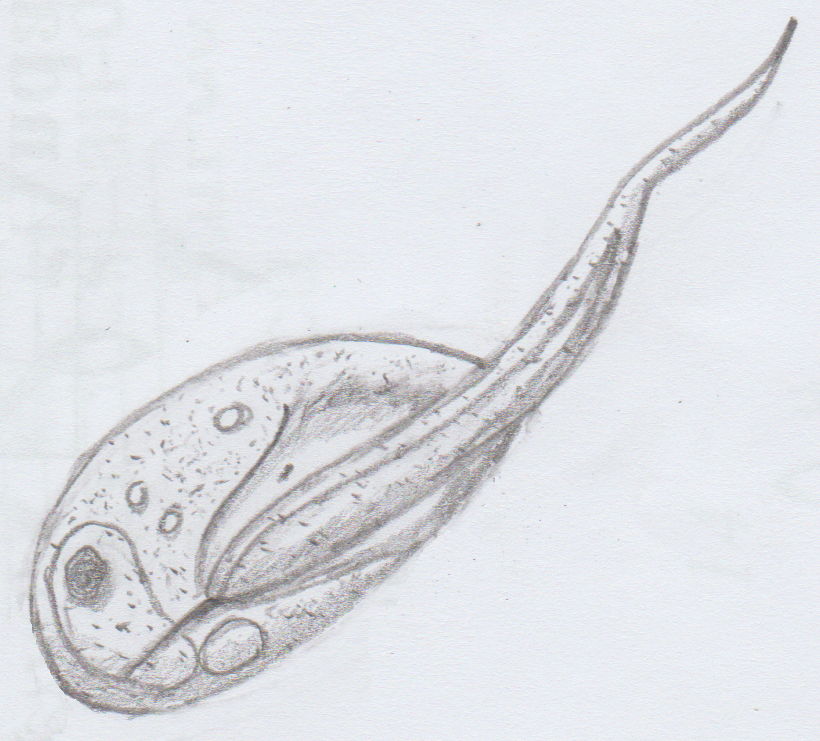
- Apusomonas sp.

Scientific classification
- Domain: Eukaryota
- Clade: Amorphea
- Class: Thecomonadea
- Order: Apusomonadida
- Family: Apusomonadidae
- Genus: Apusomonas; Aléxéieff, 1924

Type species
- Apusomonas proboscidea Aléxéieff, 1924

Species
- A. australiensis Ekelund & Patterson 1997; A. proboscidea Aléxéieff 1924

Synonyms
- Rostromonas Karpov & Zhukov, 1980

= Apusomonas =

Genus of micro-organisms

Apusomonas is a genus of Apusozoa erected by A. G. Aléxéieff in 1924.

It includes the species Apusomonas proboscidea.
