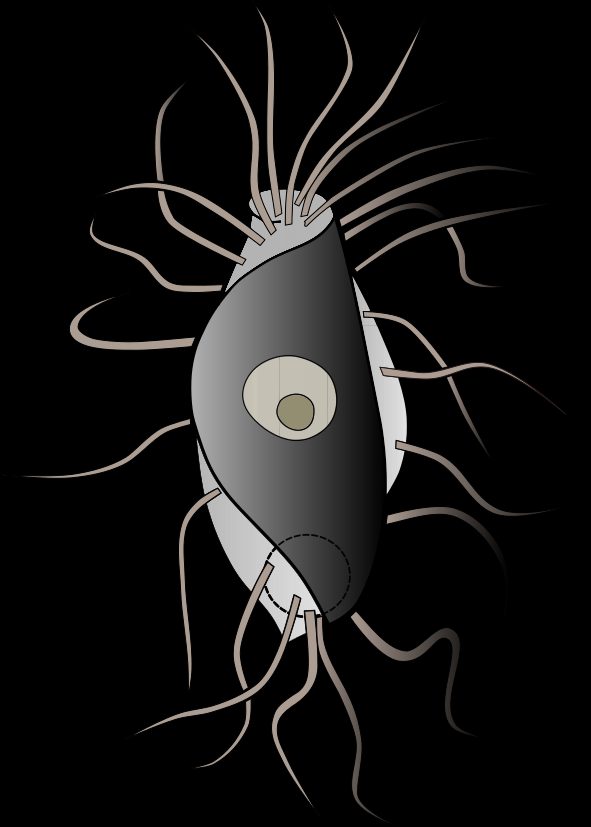
- Hemimastix amphikineta

Scientific classification
- Domain: Eukaryota
- Clade: Disparia
- Phylum: Hemimastigophora
- Class: Hemimastigea
- Order: Hemimastigida
- Family: Spironematellidae; Silva 1980 emend. Shɨshkin 2022

Genera
- Hemimastix; Spironematella; Stereonema

Synonyms
- Paramastigaceae Skuja 1948; Spironemidae Doflein 1916

= Spironematellidae =

Family of heterotrophic flagellates, in the group Hemimastigophora

Spironematellidae (previously known as Spironemidae) is a family of heterotrophic flagellates, in the group Hemimastigophora. They vary in size and shape from the ellipsoid Hemimastix amphikineta (14 × 7 μm) to the vermiform Spironematella terricola (43 × 3 μm), and are united by the possession of two rows of cilia, called kineties.

Phylogenomic analysis shows that Hemimastigophora are a distinct and ancient lineage of eukaryotic organisms, forming a possible sister clade to the supergroup Diaphoretickes.

== Classification ==
The classification of Spironematellidae, as of 2022:

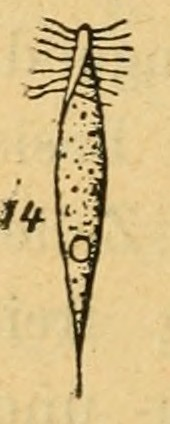
Spironematella multiciliata

- Hemimastix Foissner, Blatterer & Foissner, 1988
  - H. amphikineta Foissner, Blatterer & Foissner, 1988
  - H. kukwesjijk Eglit & Simpson, 2018
- Stereonema Foissner & Foissner 1993 non Kützing 1836
  - S. geiseri Foissner & Foissner 1993
- Spironematella Silva 1970 emend. Shɨshkin 2022 (=Spironema Klebs 1893 non Vuillemin 1905 non Léger & Hesse 1922 non Rafinesque 1838 non Hochst. 1842 non Lindley 1840 non Meek 1864)
  - S. multiciliata (Klebs 1892) Silva 1970 (=Spironema multiciliatum Klebs 1893)
  - S. terricola (Foissner & Foissner 1993) Shɨshkin 2022 (=Spironema terricola Foissner & Foissner 1993)
  - S. goodeyi (Foissner & Foissner 1993) Shɨshkin 2022(=Spironema goodeyi Foissner & Foissner 1993)
