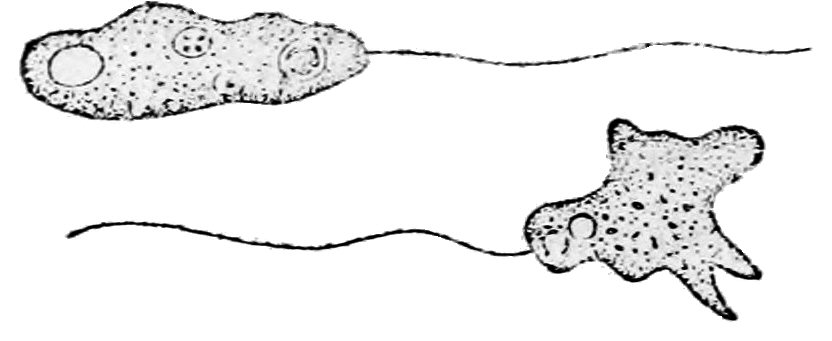

Scientific classification
- Domain: Eukaryota
- Clade: Obazoa
- Class: Breviatea
- Order: Breviatida
- Family: Breviatidae
- Genus: Breviata; Walker, Dacks & Embley 2006
- Species: B. anathema

Binomial name
- Breviata anathema Walker, Dacks & Embley 2006

= Breviata =

Genus of flagellated amoebae

Breviata anathema is a single-celled flagellate amoeboid eukaryote, previously studied under the name Mastigamoeba invertens. The cell lacks mitochondria, much like the pelobionts to which the species was previously assigned, but has remnant mitochondrial genes, and possesses an organelle believed to be a modified anaerobic mitochondrion, similar to the mitosomes and hydrogenosomes found in other eukaryotes that live in low-oxygen environments.

Early molecular data placed Breviata in the Amoebozoa, but without obvious affinity to known amoebozoan groups. More recently, phylogenomic analysis has shown that the class Breviatea is a sister group to the Opisthokonta and Apusomonadida. Together, these three groups form the clade Obazoa (the term Obazoa is based on an acronym of Opisthokonta, Breviatea, and Apusomonadida, plus 'zóa' (pertaining to 'life' in Greek)).

Its flagellar apparatus appeared to comprise two microtubular structures: a ‘vertical curtain root’ (VCR) of about a dozen microtubules partially surrounding the anterior basal body, and a ‘striated ribbon root’ apparently arising from the triplets of the posterior basal body.
