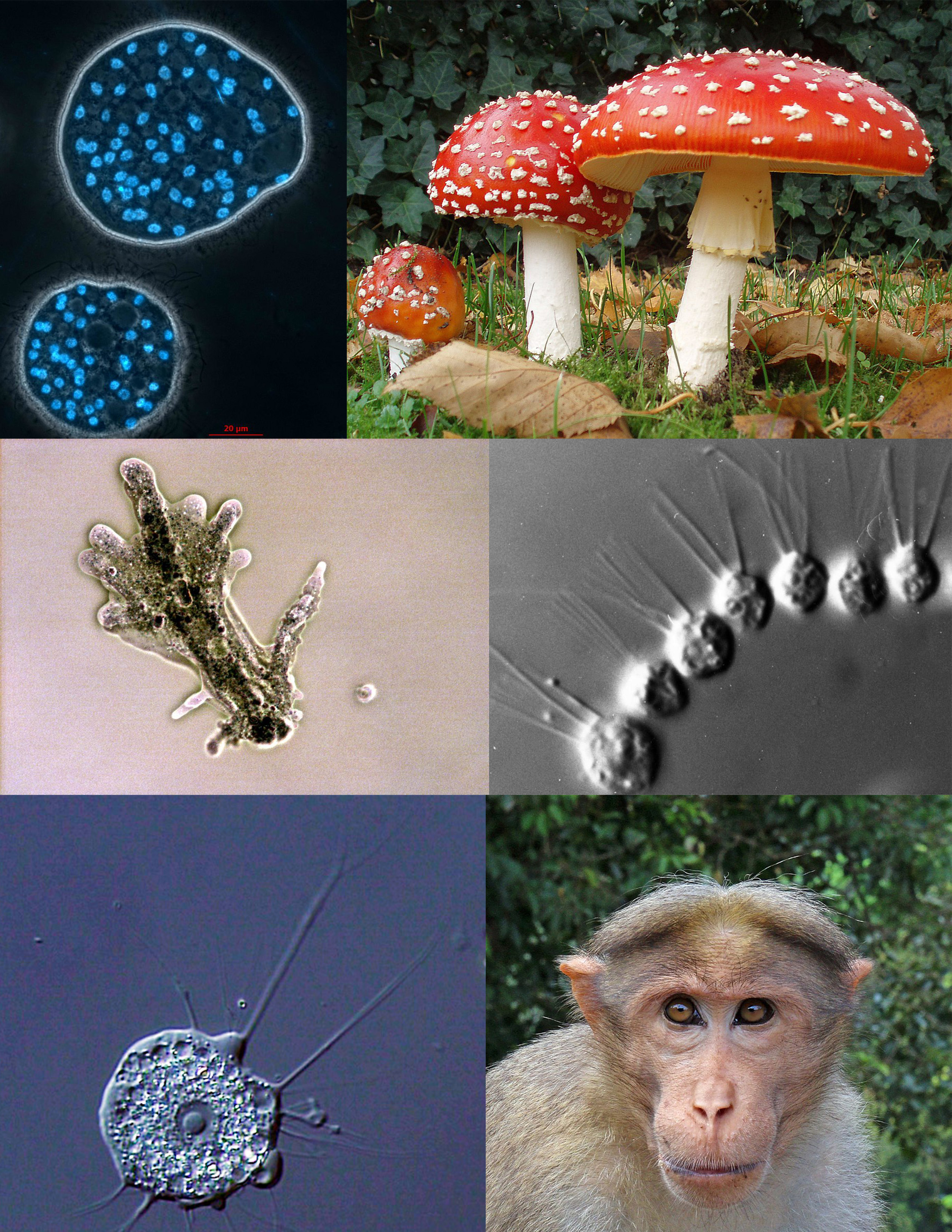
- Clockwise, from top left: beoforma whisleri (Ichthyosporea); Amanita muscaria (Fungi); Desmarella moniliformis (Choanoflagellata); Zati (Animalia); Nuclearia thermophila (Nucleariida); Amoeba proteus (Amoebozoa)

Scientific classification
- Domain: Eukaryota
- Clade: Podiata
- Supergroup: Amorphea; Adl et al. 2012

Subgroups
- Obazoa; Breviatea; Apusomonadida; Opisthokonta; Holomycota; Holozoa; Amoebozoa

Synonyms
- Unikonta; Opimoda Derelle et al. 2015

= Amorphea =

Amorpheans Temporal range: Early Ectasian - Present, 1400–0 Ma

Group including fungi, animals and various protozoa

Amorphea is a taxonomic supergroup that includes the basal Amoebozoa and Obazoa. That latter contains the Opisthokonta, which includes the fungi, animals and the choanoflagellates. The taxonomic affinities of the members of this clade were originally described and proposed by Thomas Cavalier-Smith in 2002.

The International Society of Protistologists, the recognised body for taxonomy of protozoa, recommended in 2012 that the term Unikont be changed to Amorphea because the name "Unikont" is based on a hypothesized synapomorphy that the ISOP authors and other scientists later rejected.

It includes amoebozoa, opisthokonts, and apusomonads.

== Taxonomic revisions within this group ==
Thomas Cavalier-Smith proposed a new phylum: Sulcozoa, which consists of the subphyla Apusozoa (Apusomonadida and Breviatea), and Varisulca, which includes the taxa Diphyllatea, Discocelida, Mantamonadida, Planomonadida and Rigifilida.

Further work by Cavalier-Smith showed that Sulcozoa is paraphyletic. Apusozoa also appears to be paraphyletic. Varisulca has been redefined to include planomonads, Mantamonas and Collodictyon. A new taxon has been created - Glissodiscea - for the planomonads and Mantamonas. Again, the validity of this revised taxonomy awaits confirmation.

Amoebozoa seems to be monophyletic with two major branches: Conosa and Lobosa. Conosa is divided into the aerobic infraphylum Semiconosia (Mycetozoa and Variosea) and secondarily anaerobic Archamoebae. Lobosa consists entirely of non-flagellated lobose amoebae and has been divided into two classes: Discosea, which have flattened cells, and Tubulinea, which has predominantly tube-shaped pseudopodia.

== Supergroup ==
The group includes eukaryotic cells that, for the most part, have a single emergent flagellum, or are amoebae with no flagella. The unikonts include opisthokonts (animals, fungi, and related forms) and Amoebozoa. By contrast, other well-known eukaryotic groups, which more often have two emergent flagella (although there are many exceptions), are often referred to as bikonts. Bikonts include Archaeplastida (plants and relatives) and SAR supergroup, the Cryptista, Haptista, Telonemia and Picozoa.

- Promethearchaeota (Asgard archaea)
  - Other Asgard archaea
  - - - Eukaryota 2200 mya
        - - Opimoda
            - Ancyromonadida
            - - Malawimonadida
              - Podiata
                - CRuMs
                - Amorphea 1500 mya
                  - Amoebozoa
                  - Obazoa
                    - Breviatea
                    - - Apusomonadida
                      - Opisthokonta 1300 mya
                        - Holomycota (inc. fungi)
                        - Holozoa (inc. animals)
        - Diphoda Bikonts
          - - Metamonada
            - Discoba
          - Diaphoretickes
            - CAM
              - Pancryptista
                - Microheliella
                - Cryptista
              - Archaeplastida 1600 mya
                - - Rhodophyta (red algae)
                  - Picozoa
                - - 1100 mya
                    Glaucophyta
                  - 1000 mya
                    Viridiplantae (plants)
            - - - Haptista
              - Telonemia
              - - Disparia
                  - Provora
                  - Membrifera
              - SAR
                - 550 mya
                  Rhizaria
                - Halvaria
                  - Alveolata
                  - Stramenopiles (inc brown algae)
    - - "Wenzhongarchaeales"
      - "Hodarchaeales"

One view of the great kingdoms and their stem groups. The Metamonada are hard to place, being sister possibly to Discoba or to Malawimonadida or being a paraphyletic group external to all other eukaryotes. Eukaryotes are thought to have emerged within the archaeal phylum Promethearchaeota.

== Characteristics ==
The unikonts have a triple-gene fusion that is lacking in the bikonts. The three genes that are fused together in the unikonts, but not bacteria or bikonts, encode enzymes for synthesis of the pyrimidine nucleotides: carbamoyl phosphate synthase, dihydroorotase and aspartate carbamoyltransferase. This must have involved a double fusion, a rare pair of events, supporting the shared ancestry of Opisthokonta and Amoebozoa.

Cavalier-Smith originally proposed that unikonts ancestrally had a single flagellum and single basal body. This is unlikely, however, as flagellated opisthokonts, as well as some flagellated Amoebozoa, including Breviata, actually have two basal bodies, as in typical 'bikonts' (even though only one is flagellated in most unikonts). This paired arrangement can also be seen in the organization of centrioles in typical animal cells. In spite of the name of the group, the common ancestor of all 'unikonts' was probably a cell with two basal bodies.
