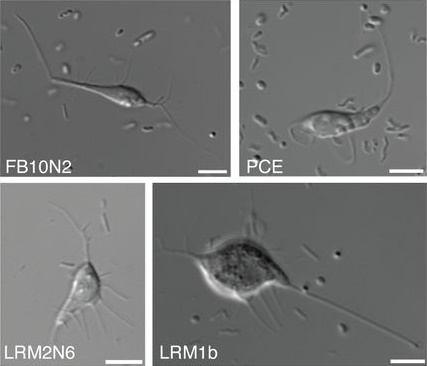
- Differential interference contrast micrographs of four strains of undescribed marine breviates. Scale bars: 5 µm

Scientific classification
- Domain: Eukaryota
- Clade: Podiata
- Clade: Amorphea
- Clade: Obazoa
- Class: Breviatea; Cavalier-Smith in Cavalier-Smith et al. 2004
- Order: Breviatida; Cavalier-Smith 2004

Genera
- Breviatidae; Breviata; Subulatomonas; Pygsuidae; Pygsuia; Lenisia

Diversity
- 4 species

= Breviatea =

Group of protists

Breviatea, commonly known as breviate amoebae, are a group of free-living, amitochondriate protists with uncertain phylogenetic position. They are biflagellate, and can live in anaerobic (oxygen-free) environments. They are currently placed in the Obazoa clade. They likely do not possess vinculin proteins. Their metabolism relies on fermentative production of ATP as an adaptation to their low-oxygen environment.

The lineage emerged roughly one billion years ago, at a time when the oxygen content of the Earth's oceans was low, and they thus developed anaerobic lifestyles. Together with apusomonads, they are the closest relatives of the opisthokonts, a group that includes animals and fungi.

== Characteristics ==
=== Mitochondrion-related organelles ===
Mitochondrion-related organelles (MROs) are organelles that evolved from a degradation of ancestral, fully functional mitochondria. Among Breviatea, MROs are present in Pygsuia, Breviata and Subulatomonas. In the cells of Pygsuia, for which the complete transcriptome is known, there is a single smooth MRO that lacks a mitochondrial genome and most components of the electron transport chain. Of the citric acid cycle enzymes, which are present in the mitochondria in other organisms, only two are present in Pygsuia: fumarase and succinate dehydrogenase. In contrast, Lenisia cells contain multiple MROs with cristae.

== Evolution ==
Breviatea is a clade of basal eukaryotes. They are closely related to the apusomonads and the Opisthokonta supergroup, and together they compose the larger clade Obazoa, which is the sister group to Amoebozoa. Within Breviatea, the four known genera are distributed into smaller clades of two species each: one uniting Breviata with Subulatomonas, and one uniting Lenisia with Pygsuia.

- Podiata
  - CRuMs
  - Amorphea
    - Amoebozoa
    - Obazoa
      - - Breviatea
          - - Breviatidae
              - Breviata anathema
              - Subulatomonas tetraspora
          - - Lenisia limosa
            - Pygsuidae
              Pygsuia biforma
      - - Apusomonadida
        - Opisthokonta
          - Holozoa
          - Holomycota

The Breviatea group also has a recently found Breviatea-related sister clade with mitochondrial genomes. these groups, found in intertidal mudflat sediment, contain many of the ETC components lost in Breviatea.

== Taxonomy ==
=== History ===
The class Breviatea was created in 2004 by British protozoologist Thomas Cavalier-Smith to group a problematic taxon previously known as 'Mastigamoeba invertens'. This organism, initially classified in the Archamoebae within phylum Amoebozoa, appeared to strongly diverge in phylogenetic trees based on ribosomal RNA and had a structure very different from other archamoebae. Because of these results, 'M. invertens' was separated into the order Breviatida, contained in the monotypic class Breviatea. The organism was eventually renamed Breviata anathema. A second genus and species, Subulatomonas tetraspora, was described in 2011. Cavalier-Smith established a family-level rank, Breviatidae, for both genera in 2013. The same year, a third genus and species of breviates was described, Pygsuia biforma, later classified by Cavalier-Smith in a separate family Pygsuidae. In 2016, a fourth breviate Lenisia limosa was described without a family rank.

=== Classification ===
There are currently four accepted genera, each containing only one species.

- Breviata Walker, Dacks & Embley, 2006
  - Breviata anathema Walker, Dacks & Embley, 2006
- Lenisia Hamann et al., 2016
  - Lenisia limosa Hamann et al., 2016
- Pygsuia Brown et al., 2013
  - Pygsuia biforma Brown et al., 2013
- Subulatomonas Katz et al., 2011
  - Subulatomonas tetraspora Katz et al., 2011

== Distribution ==
Breviate species have been found in aquatic environments in various parts of the world, including off the coast of Prince Edward Island on the eastern coast of North America, around the San Juan Islands on the western coast of North America, off the coast of Catalonia in Spain, and in the Wadden Sea along the coast of Germany.
