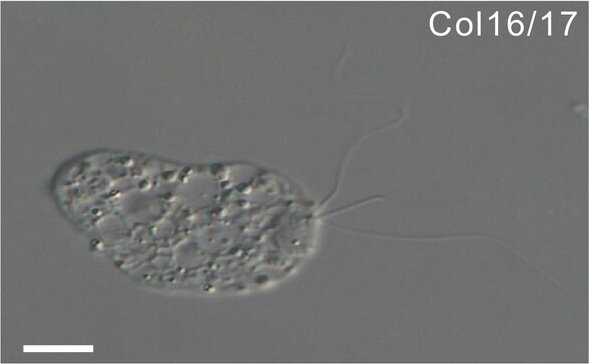
- Differential interference contrast micrograph of Collodictyon sp. Scale bar: 10 μm.

Scientific classification
- Domain: Eukaryota
- Clade: Podiata
- Clade: CRuMs; Brown et al. 2018

Subgroups
- Diphylleida; Rigifilida; Mantamonas; Glissandra

Synonyms
- Crumalia Zmitrovich, Perelygin & Zharikov 2022; Varisulca Cavalier-Smith 2013, emend. 2022

= CRuMs =

Clade of protists

CRuMs is a clade of microbial eukaryotes, whose name is an acronym of the following constituent groups: Collodictyonida, Rigifilida, and Mantamonas. It is a sister clade of the Amorphea. A new CRuMs order Glissandrida was proposed in 2025 to place the yet unclassified genus Glissandra. It more or less supersedes Varisulca, as Ancyromonadida are inferred not to be specifically related to the orders Diphylleida / Collodictyonida, Rigifilida and Mantamonadida.

== Phylogeny ==
- Opimoda
  - Ancyromonadida
  - - Malawimonadea
    - Podiata
      - Amorphea
        - Amoebozoa
        - Obazoa
          - Breviatea
          - - Apusomonadida
            - Opisthokonta (inc. fungi and animals)
      - CRuMs
        - Mantamonadida
        - - Glissandrida
          - - Rigifilida
            - Diphylleida
