= Hyalochlorella =

Hyalochlorella marina

Scientific classification
- Domain: Eukaryota
- Clade: Podiata
- Supergroup: Amorphea
- Clade: Obazoa
- Clade: Opisthokonta
- Clade: Holozoa
- Clade: Ichthyosporea
- Genus: Hyalochlorella
- Species: H. marina

Binomial name
- Hyalochlorella marina
- R. O. Poyton, 1970

Genus of Opisthokonta

Hyalochlorella marina, is a Ichthyosporea, placing its phylogenic position near animals making it useful as a source of information about animala evolution. It is the only species in the genus Hyalochlorella and also known as Dermocystidium sp., is a marine heterotrophic eukaryote.

== Phylogeny ==
- Opisthokonta
  - Holomycota (inc. fungi)
  - Holozoa
    - Ichthyosporea H. marina
    - Pluriformea
    - Filozoa
      - Filasterea
      - Choanozoa
        - Choanoflagellatea
        - Animalia over 650 mya

== Ecology ==
H. marina is an epiphyte of marine seaweeds but has also been isolated from seawater. Hyalochlorella is found on several shores of east and west coast of the United States, Canada, the United Kingdom, and off the Faroe Islands.
