= Tunicaraptor =

Scientific classification
- Domain: Eukaryota
- Clade: Podiata
- Supergroup: Amorphea
- Clade: Obazoa
- Clade: Opisthokonta
- Clade: Holozoa
- Clade: incertae sedis
- Genus: Tunicaraptor; Tikhonenkov et al. 2020
- Species: T. unikontum

Binomial name
- Tunicaraptor unikontum Tikhonenkov et al. 2020

Genus of protists

Tunicaraptor is a genus of marine microbial protists containing the single species Tunicaraptor unikontum, discovered in 2020 from marine waters of Chile. It is a lineage of predatorial flagellates closely related to animals. It has a rare feeding structure not seen in other opisthokonts.

== Morphology ==
Tunicaraptor unikontum is a small unicellular flagellate composed of oval cells similar to some fungal zoospores, with a length of 3–5 μm. It has one flagellum with a flagellar pocket, and an external envelope or 'theca' with long hairs of around 110 nm. Unlike other unicellular opisthokonts, Tunicaraptor cells possess a 'mouth', a specialized feeding structure in the anterior part of the cell. There are two centrioles: one develops a flagellum and the other rotates to the kinetosome. The mitochondrial cristae are flat and associated with lipid globules.

== Discovery and etymology ==
Tunicaraptor unikontum was isolated from marine waters of the coast of Chile. Its morphology and phylogenetic relationships were analyzed and published in 2020 in the journal Current Biology. The name Tunicaraptor means 'predator covered with tunica', while unikontum (from Latin unus 'one' and Ancient Greek κοντός 'pole') means 'single flagellum'.

== Ecology ==
Tunicaraptor unikontum is found in marine environments. It is a eukaryovorous predator, meaning it can only feed on other eukaryotes, and it is not capable of consuming bacteria. During feeding, many different cells can aggregate and feed jointly on the same eukaryotic prey.

== Evolution ==
Tunicaraptor is an independent lineage of Holozoan protists, but its placement is not resolved. Three different phylogenetic positions of Tunicaraptor have been obtained from analyses: as sister to Filasterea, as sister to Filozoa or as the sister group to all Holozoa. The characteristics of the Rel homology region of the filasterean Txikispora philomaios was highly similar to Tunicaraptor unikontum, suggesting a phylogenetic relationship between the two species.

- Opisthokonta
  - Holozoa
    - Filozoa
      - Choanozoa
        - Metazoa
        - Choanoflagellata
      - Filasterea
    - Tunicaraptor
    - Pluriformea
      - Corallochytrium
      - Syssomonas
    - Ichthyosporea
  - Holomycota

In search for the genes responsible for animal multicellularity across the eukaryote evolution, a precursor for a neuropeptide gene, nesfatin-1, has also been found in Tunicaraptor unikontum. These discoveries suggest that neuropeptide signaling in animals has a deep evolutionary ancestry in their unicellular relatives.
