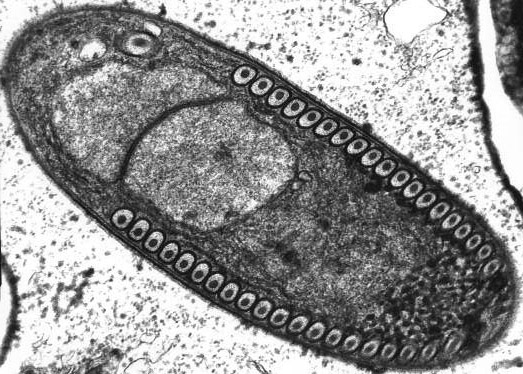
- Sporoblast of Fibrillanosema crangonycis (Microsporidian)

Scientific classification (obsolete as paraphyletic)
- Domain: Eukaryota
- Clade: Podiata
- Clade: Amorphea
- Clade: Obazoa
- Clade: Opisthokonta
- Clade: Holomycota
- (unranked): Zoosporia
- Superphylum: Opisthosporidia; Karpov et al. 2014

Groups included
- Aphelida; Rozellida; Microsporidia; BCG1?; BCG2?; GS01?; Namako-37?

Cladistically included but traditionally excluded taxa
- Eumycota

= Opisthosporidia =

Clade of fungi

Opisthosporidia is a superphylum of intracellular parasites with amoeboid vegetative stage, defined as a common group of eukaryotic groups Microsporidia, Cryptomycota (also known as Rozellida, Rozellomycota, or Rozellosporidia) and Aphelidea. They have been considered to represent a monophyletic lineage with shared ecological and structural features, being a sister clade of the Fungi. Together with the Fungi they represent a sister clade of the Cristidiscoidea, together forming the Holomycota.

Several other basal groups of the freshwater, marine and soil-inhabiting Holomycota were identified in recent studies, as the 'basal clone group 1' (BCG1=NCLC1), 'basal clone group 2' (BCG2), 'basal marine group' (NAMAKO-37), 'basal group GS01', the inner relationships of Opisthosporidia were clarified and their monophyly questioned: Cryptomycota and Microsporidia were proposed to join the phylum Rozellomycota, while Aphelidea were considered as a separate, though related phylum and all these groups were considered basal lineages of the kingdom Fungi.

Instead of probably paraphyletic Opisthosporidia, the phyla Rozellomycota and Aphelidiomycota (or monotypic subkingdoms Rozellomyceta and Aphelidiomyceta) are recently applied in some taxonomical systems of the kingdom Fungi for the basal lineages, and the other fungal lineages are grouped into a clade of True Fungi (Eumycota). (Note: Unlike mycologists, some protistologists do not consider these two groups to be part of Fungi and call them Opishophagea Galindo et al. 2023 and Aphelida. The group of Aphelida + Fungi is then called Phytophagea Galindo et al. 2023) However, the taking up of the name Rozellomycota in such a broad sense can be considered premature, especially as the structure and biological features of a larger part of these organisms are unclear as they are known only from environmental sequences. The borders between Fungi and Protista are therefore unstable and final delimitation of taxa is problematic due to poor coverage of molecular data for the representatives of the basal groups.

- Opisthokonts
  - Holomycota
    - Cristidiscoidea
      - Fonticulida
      - Nucleariida
    - Fungi
      - BCG2 + GS01
      - - - BCG1
          - Rozellomyceta
            - - Namako-37
              - Microsporidia
                - Chytridiopsidea
                - - Metchnikovellea
                  - Microsporea
            - Cryptomycota = Rozellosporidia s.s.
        - - Aphelidiomyceta
            Aphelida
          - True Fungi
  - Holozoa
    - Ichthyosporea
    - - Pluriformea
        - Corallochytrium
        - Syssomonas
      - Filozoa
        - Filasterea
        - Choanozoa
          - Choanoflagellatea
          - Animalia
