= Txikispora =

Scientific classification
- Domain: Eukaryota
- Supergroup: Amorphea
- Clade: Obazoa
- Clade: Opisthokonta
- Clade: Holozoa
- Clade: Filozoa
- Class: Filasterea
- Family: Txikisporidae
- Genus: Txikispora
- Species: T. philomaios

Binomial name
- Txikispora philomaios Urrutia, Feist & Bass

Genus of unicellular protists

Txikispora is a genus of parasitic protists solely known from the species Txikispora philomaios. It is the only genus in the family Txikisporidae, which is a member of the class Filasterea and is closely related to Ministeriidae. The lineage was first described in 2022 based on specimens identified from the United Kingdom. The species represents a previously undiscovered type of life that diverged extremely early from animals and fungi. It parasitizes amphipods in the genera Echinogammarus and Orchestia and most frequently infects their hemolymph and hemocytes.

== Description ==
The species goes through several stages of life. The first is as a single spherical cell, called the monokaryotic stage. It usually has a cell wall, and is characterized by a nucleus with a small nucleolus on its periphery and many small mitochondria with diverse lipoid structures. The next stage is multinucleated, and consists of four cells joined together and is somewhat larger. It appears to have three cells, with the fourth often hidden from view. The unicellular stage is often split off from the multicellular one.

== Taxonomy and etymology ==
The Filozoan species was described in 2022 in the Journal of Eukaryotic Microbiology by Ander Urrutia, Stephen Feist, and David Bass. The new generic and specific combination Txikispora philomaios means "May-loving spore", in reference to its presence in collections during only a few days during the month of May. Txikispora is derived from a Basque word: txiki meaning "small" and a latin one spora meaning "spore". The specific epithet philomaios is: philo meaning "love" and maios meaning "May".

A Rel homology region (RHR) was identified in Txikispora philomaios. The characteristics of the RHR of Txikispora philomaios was most similar to Tunicaraptor unikontum, suggesting a phylogenetic relationship between the two species.

== Ecology ==
Txikispora philomaios parasitizes the amphipod genera Echinogammarus and Orchestia, but is not found in the related genera Gammarus and Melita. Individuals infected by the parasite displayed yellowing tegument, a less rigid carapace, less visible internal organs, and increased lethargy and unresponsiveness. Txikispora philomaios specifically infects the hemolymph and individual hemocytes, with up to ten parasites found in a single hemocyte. Other organs that are infected are the hepatopancreas, testes, and ovaries.
