= Teretosporea =

Scientific classification
- Domain: Eukaryota
- Clade: Podiata
- Clade: Amorphea
- Clade: Obazoa
- Clade: Opisthokonta
- Clade: Holozoa
- Clade?: Teretosporea; Torruella et al. 2015

Subdivisions
- Pluriformea; Ichthyosporea

Synonyms
- Ichthyosporea Cavalier-Smith 1998 sensu Cavalier-Smith 2022

Possible taxonomic clade

Teretosporea are a proposed basal Holozoa clade in which Ichthyosporea and Pluriformea emerged with the Filozoa as sister clade. Since it is close to the divergence between the main lineages of fungi and animals, the study of Teretosporea can provide crucial information on the divergent lifestyles of these groups.

- Opisthokonta
  - Holomycota
    - - Fungi
      - Opisthosporidia
    - Cristidiscoidea
      - Nucleariida
      - Fonticulida
  - Holozoa
    - Teretosporea
      - Ichthyosporea
      - Pluriformea
    - Filozoa
      - Filasterea
      - Choanozoa
        - Choanoflagellatea
        - Animalia
