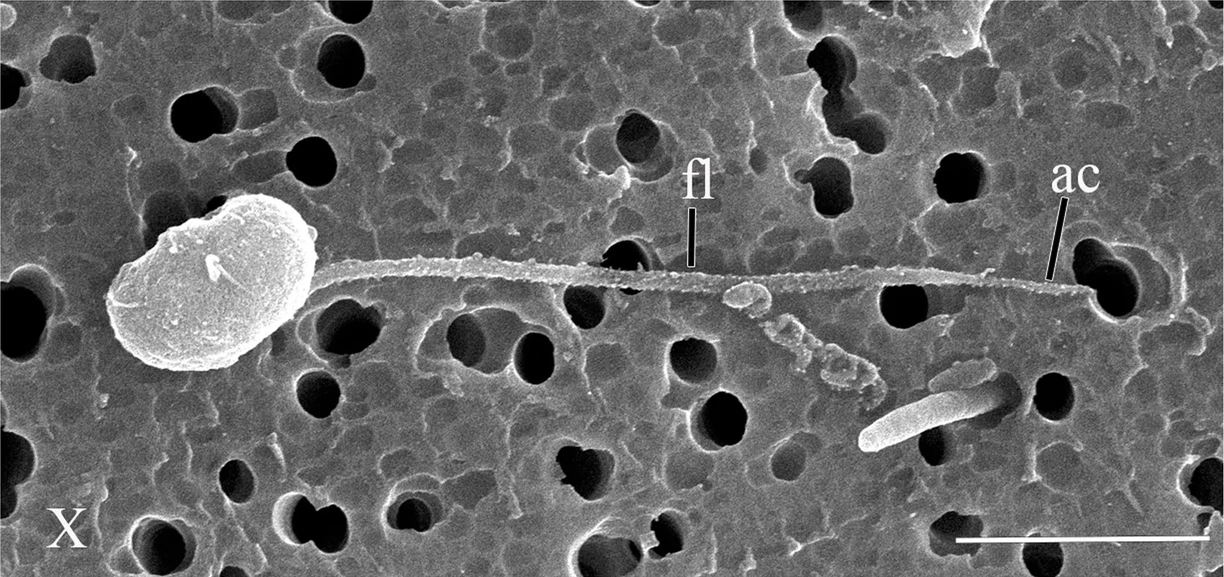
- SEM image of Syssomonas. ac = acroneme, fl = flagellum

Scientific classification
- Domain: Eukaryota
- Clade: Obazoa
- Clade: Opisthokonta
- Clade: Pluriformea
- Family: Syssomonadidae; Cavalier-Smith 2022
- Genus: Syssomonas; Tikhonenkov et al. 2017
- Species: S. multiformis

Binomial name
- Syssomonas multiformis Tikhonenkov et al. 2017

Type strain
- Colp-12; MI-PR205 (Note: Deposited in the Marine Invertebrate Collection, Beaty Biodiversity Museum, University of British Columbia)

= Syssomonas =

Genus of protists

Syssomonas is a monotypic genus of unicellular flagellated protists containing the species Syssomonas multiformis. It is a member of Pluriformea inside the lineage of Holozoa, a clade containing animals and their closest protistan relatives. It lives in freshwater habitats. It has a complex life cycle that includes unicellular amoeboid and flagellated phases, as well as multicellular aggregates, depending on the growth medium and nutritional state.

== Life stages ==
Syssomonas multiformis is a species of unicellular protists with naked cells (lacking any shell or scales) that presents with a variety of life forms during their complex life cycle. These forms include: round flagellate cells (7–14 μm in diameter) with one posterior flagellum, amoeboflagellate (i.e. with both flagella and pseudopodia) cells, amoeboid non-flagellar cells, and spherical cysts. They can also form clusters of multiple cells.

=== Unicellular stages: flagellar, amoeboid and cyst ===
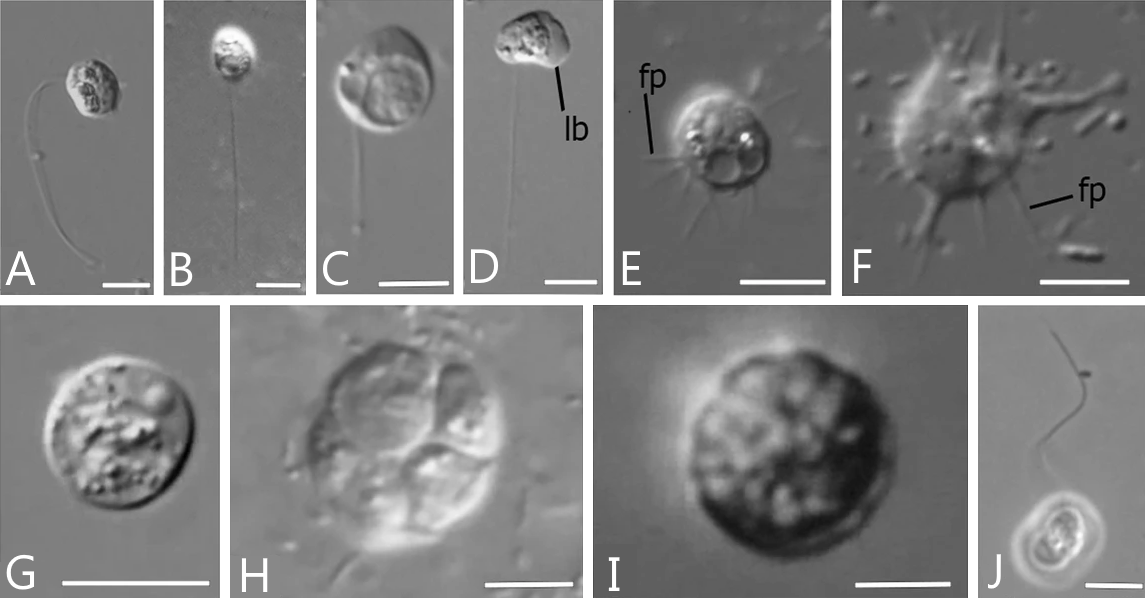
External morphology and life forms of Syssomonas multiformis. A-B-C: swimming flagellated cells. D: amoeboflagellate (lb = lobopodia). E-F: amoeboid cells (fp = filopodia). G: cyst. H: palintomic cell division inside a cyst. I: cyst with vesicles. J: attached flagellated cell.

In the flagellate swimming stage, the most common stage in their life cycle, the cells of Syssomonas resemble a typical opisthokont cell, reminiscent of animal sperm cells or chytrid zoospores. There is one smooth flagellum that emerges from the middle-lateral point of the cell, turns back, and directs backwards during swimming. While swimming, the fast beating of the flagellum can create the appearance of two flagella. The swimming cells rotate, and can suddenly stop and change direction of the movement. Solitary cells can attach temporarily to a substrate through the anterior part of the cell body, and produce water flow by rapid flagellar beating, resembling choanoflagellates or choanocytes from sponges. Floating cells move downwards to transform into amoeboflagellates by generating wide lobopodia and thin short filopodia, and slowing the flagellar beating. The amoeboflagellates can crawl along the substrate through their anterior lobopodia.

The amoeboflagellate stages of Syssomonas can lose the flagellum by three different ways: discarding it abruptly, retracting it into the cell when stretched out, or coil under the cell and then retract into the cell as a spiral. As a result they become the amoeboid stage, which produces thin short filopodia and sometimes have two contractile vacuoles. Both amoebae and amoeboflagellates can turn back into flagellates.

The amoeboid stage can retract its filopodia and become a round cyst, in which palintomic cell division (i.e. rapid cell divisions without cytoplasmic growth in between, a characteristic of animal embryonic cleavage) can occur, generating 2, 4, 8 or 16 flagellated cells that are released from inside the cyst.

=== Aggregative multicellular stages ===
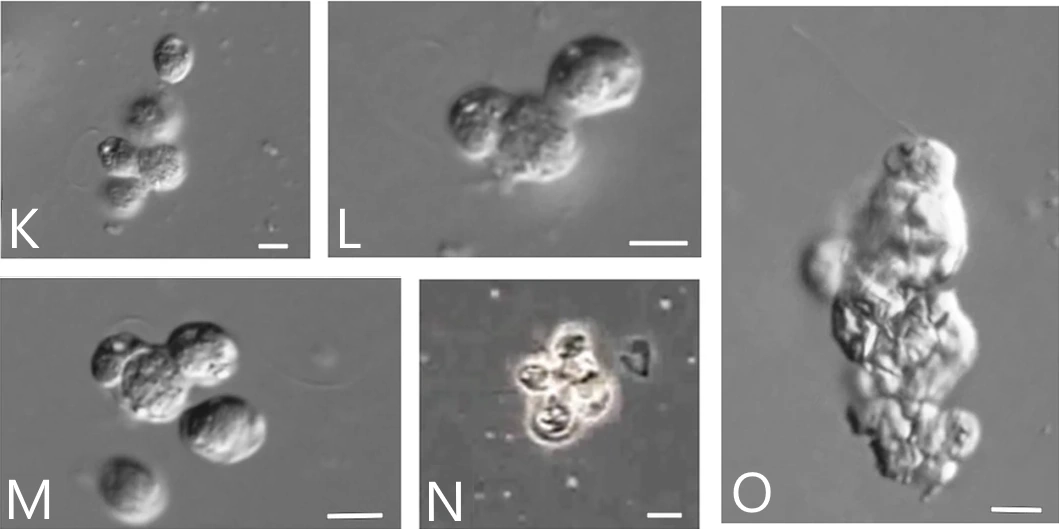
K-M, O: cellular aggregations of Syssomonas near the bottom of the Petri dish. N: floating aggregate of flagellated cells.

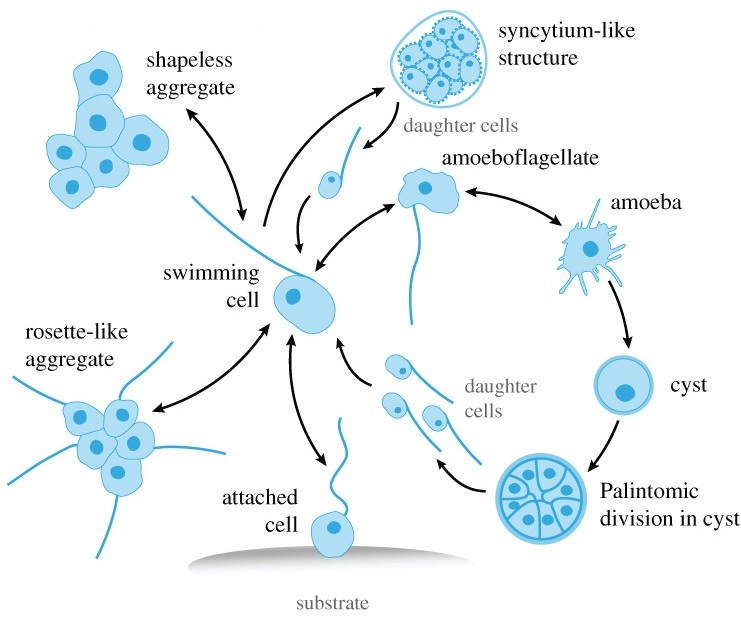
Life cycle of S. multiformis (schema)

Cells of Syssomonas can merge partially and form temporary aggregations of about 3–10 cells, usually shapeless and observed near the bottom of the water column. They can also aggregate by joining only flagellated cells together, with their flagella directed outwards, resembling the rosette-like colonies of choanoflagellates. Both aggregations break up easily, and their cell membranes are not fused.

In solid cultures, solitary cells can sometimes merge completely at the bottom of the Petri dish into a syncytium-like or pseudoplasmodium structure, in which the nuclei do not merge. From these syncytia, budding of daughter cells occurs. This phenomenon of budding from syncytia has not been observed in any other eukaryotes, although the formation of multinucleated cells as a result of aggregation of multiple cells is known in other protist lineages (dictyostelids in Eumycetozoa, Copromyxa in Tubulinea, acrasids in Excavata, Sorogena in Alveolata, Sorodiplophrys in Stramenopiles, Guttulinopsis in Rhizaria, and Fonticula alba within the opisthokonts). The transition from an amoeboid filopodial stage to an aggregative stage is also observed in another holozoan, Capsaspora owczarzaki. The formation of Syncytia also occurs in animals; the cytoplasm of glass sponges, teguments of flatworms, and the skeletal muscles and placenta of mammals are all syncytial structures.

The merging of cells in Syssomonas attracts, likely by chemical signaling, other nearby cells that actively swim and try to attach to the aggregates. This appears to be the only method by which aggregates grow, as opposed to cell division.

== Ecology ==
Syssomonas multiformis was isolated from a freshwater pool in Vietnam. The organism can survive temperatures ranging from 5 to 36 °C. It feeds on the cytoplasmic content of other eukaryotes of similar size, which is an unusual trait among unicellular holozoans. In particular, it is a predator of heterotrophic chrysomonads and bodonids (e.g. Parabodo caudatus and Spumella species). They can also engulf bacteria and small debris, in a similar manner to choanoflagellates.

In contrast to many other eukaryotic protists, Syssomonas cells do not possess any extruding organelles for hunting. Instead, they attach to the prey cell and suck out their cytoplasm without ingesting the cell membrane. They feed better on inactive, slow or dead cells or cysts. Likely by chemical signaling, after one cell attaches to the prey, many other Syssomonas cells become attracted to the same prey cell and try to attach to it. Several cells can suck out the cytoplasm of the same prey cell jointly.

They use short pseudopodia to feed on clusters of bacteria. Afterwards, they form a large food vacuole at the posterior cell end. However, bacteria alone are not sufficient nutrition for Syssomonas: without any eukaryotic prey, their cells die or form resting cysts.

== Evolution ==
As a lineage of Holozoa, Syssomonas is one of many protist groups closely related to animals and is therefore a subject of research in the search for the origin of animal multicellularity. The first phylogenomic analyses including Syssomonas recovered the genus as the sister taxon of Corallochytrium. Together, they compose the clade Pluriformea, which was recovered as the sister taxon of Filozoa. An alternative hypothesis places Pluriformea as the sister group of Ichthyosporea in a clade known as Teretosporea. The following cladogram displays the position of Syssomonas among the opisthokonts, according to the first hypothesis:

- Opisthokonta
  - Holozoa
    - - Filozoa
        - Choanozoa
          - Metazoa
          - Choanoflagellata
        - Filasterea
          - - Pigoraptor
            - Capsaspora owczarzaki
          - Ministeria vibrans
      - Pluriformea
        - Syssomonas multiformis
        - Corallochytrium limacisporum
    - Ichthyosporea
  - Holomycota
