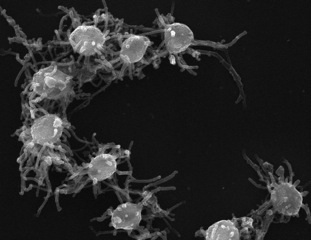

Scientific classification
- Domain: Eukaryota
- Supergroup: Amorphea
- Clade: Obazoa
- Clade: Opisthokonta
- Clade: Holozoa
- Class: Filasterea
- Order: Ministeriida
- Family: Capsasporidae; Cavalier-Smith, 2008
- Genus: Capsaspora; Hertel, Bayne & Loker 2002
- Species: C. owczarzaki

Binomial name
- Capsaspora owczarzaki Hertel, Bayne & Loker 2002

= Capsaspora =

Single-celled eukaryote genus

Capsaspora is a monotypic genus of protists containing the single species Capsaspora owczarzaki. C. owczarzaki is a single-celled eukaryote that occupies a key phylogenetic position in our understanding of the origin of animal multicellularity, as one of the closest unicellular relatives to animals. It is, together with Ministeria vibrans, a member of the Filasterea clade. This amoeboid protist has been pivotal to unraveling the nature of the unicellular ancestor of animals, which has been proved to be much more complex than previously thought.

== Description ==
C. owczarzaki was originally described as an amoeba-like "symbiont" of the fresh-water snail Biomphalaria glabrata. The amoebae were obtained from the haemolymph of snails originally sampled in Puerto Rico.

C. owczarzaki's life cycle comprises 3 different stages with three different cell types, which was reported in 2017. Under culture conditions, C. owczarzaki's filopodial cells crawl attached to the substrate, with active replication until the end of the exponential growth phase. Then, cells start to detach, retracting the branching filopodia and encysting. During this cystic phase, division is stopped. Alternatively, amoebae can actively aggregate to each other by unknown factors, forming a multicellular, aggregative structure and secreting an unstructured extracellular material that seems to prevent direct cell-to-cell contact.

C. owczarzaki cells, in the filopodial stage, were described as 3 to 5 μm amoebas with a nucleus 1/3 - 1/2 of the diameter of the cell (containing a central nucleolus), long branched filopodia, mitochondria with flattened cristae, numerous phagosomes, lipid vacuoles, glycogen granules and a Golgi apparatus. Cystic cells measure 4 to 5 μm with a double wall: the outer thin, irregular and loosely attached; and the inner thicker, smooth.

== Taxonomy ==
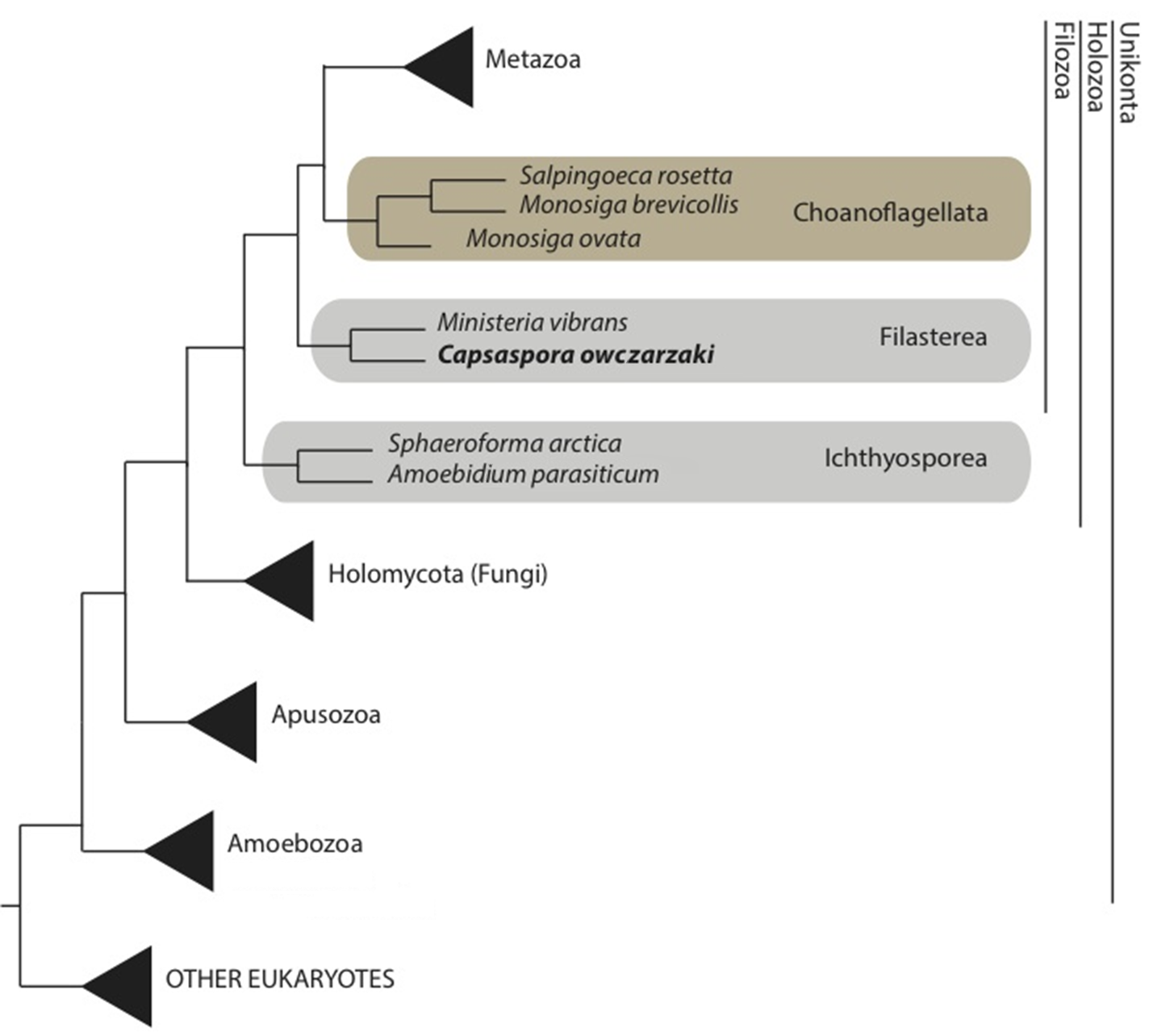
Phylogenetic position of Capsaspora

C. owczarzaki is together with Ministeria vibrans a member of the Filasterea clade. This group is the sister group to a clade comprising Metazoa and Choanoflagellata, which together form the Filozoa. C. owczarzaki was originally described as nucleariids. However, later molecular ribosomal phylogenies placed C. owczarzaki somewhere closer to animals than the rest of nucleariids. Finally, a multi-gene phylogenetic analysis with several opisthokont taxa clearly showed that C. owczarzaki is not a nucleariid, but part of the Holozoa. This was later on corroborated by phylogenomic analyses, one of which situated it as sister-group to Ministeria forming the Filasterea clade, which is the sister-group to Choanoflagellatea and Metazoa.

== Applications ==
C. owczarzaki is of scientific interest because it is one of the closest unicellular relatives of multicellular animals. Its genome has recently been sequenced and shows several genes involved in metazoan multicellularity, such as integrins, metazoan transcription factors, and protein tyrosine kinases. Moreover, it has relevance to human health because its host, the snail Biomphalaria glabrata, is also the intermediate host of the digenean flatworm Schistosoma mansoni, the causative agent of widespread schistosomiasis in humans. C. owczarzaki not only parasitizes the intermediate host of S. mansoni but also attacks and kills the sporocysts of the flatworm living inside the snail.
