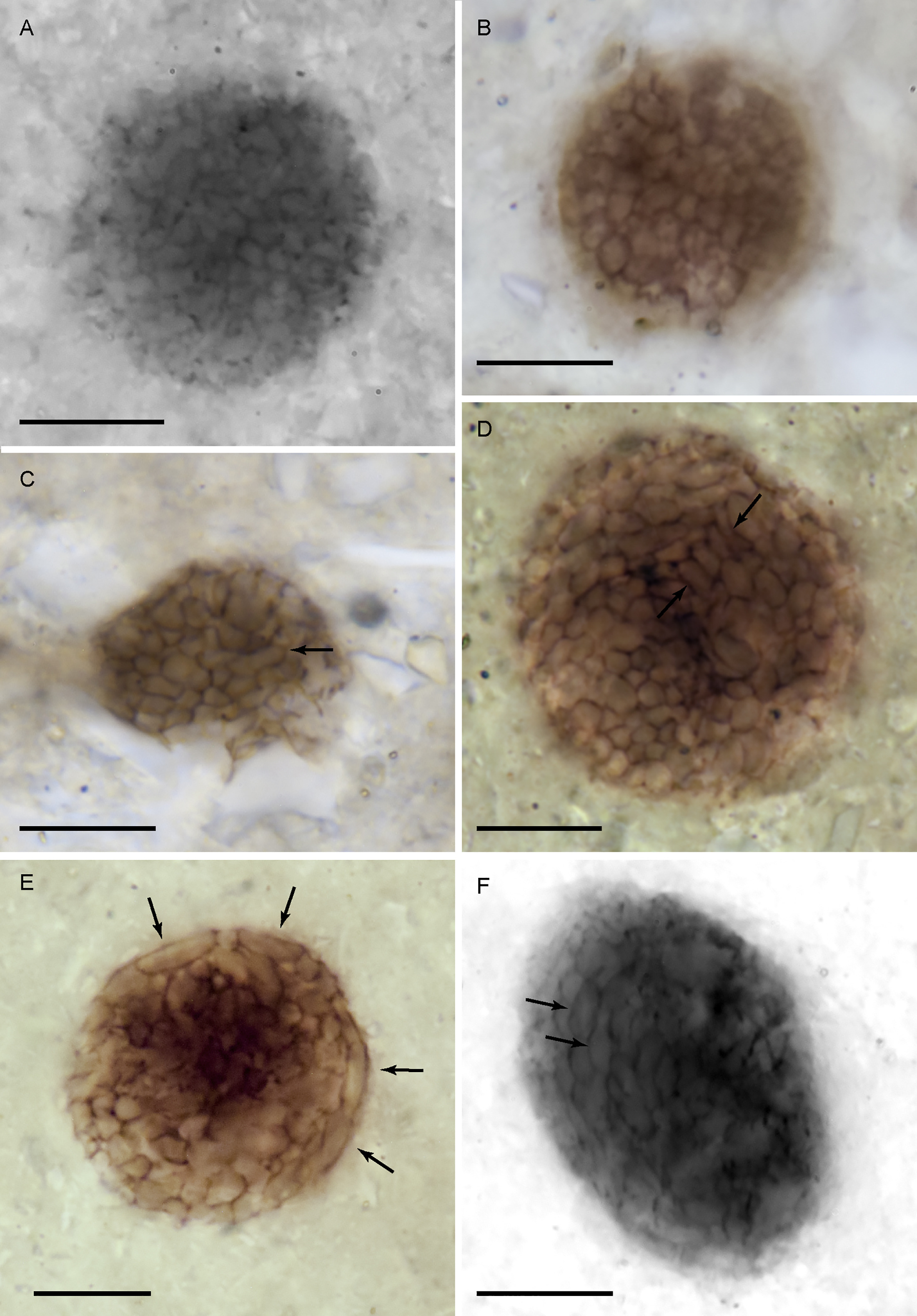
- Multiple specimens of B. brasieri, such as the holotype (A)

Scientific classification
- Domain: Eukaryota
- Clade: Podiata
- Clade: Amorphea
- Clade: Obazoa
- Clade: Opisthokonta
- Clade: Holozoa
- Clade: incertae sedis
- Genus: †Bicellum; Strother et al. 2021
- Species: †B. brasieri

Binomial name
- †Bicellum brasieri Strother et al. 2021

= Bicellum =

Bicellum Temporal range: 1000 Ma

Fossil holozoan

Bicellum is a genus of fossil holozoans containing the single species Bicellum brasieri. It is one billion years old (Proterozoic) and could be the oldest example of complex multicellularity in the evolutionary lineage leading to the animals, and has been described as bridging "the gap between the very first living creatures — single-celled organisms — and more complex multicellular life." It was discovered in 2021, and is posthumously named after the late Martin Brasier, a paleontologist who was a co-author of the paper that first described it.

== Fossil site ==
Bicellum was found in sediments from the Diabaig Formation in Loch Torridon, Scotland. The Diabaig Formation, considered to represent an ancient lake deposit, was already known to preserve the first non-marine aquatic eukaryotes and non-marine eukaryotes in general.
