= Eccrinales =

Scientific classification
- Domain: Eukaryota
- (unranked): Opisthokonta
- (unranked): Holozoa
- Class: Mesomycetozoea
- Order: Eccrinales

Order of protists

Eccrinales are an order of eukaryotes, previously thought to be zygomycete fungi belonging to the class Trichomycetes, but now considered to be members of the opisthokont group Mesomycetozoea.

== Taxonomy ==
- Order: Eccrinales
  - Family: Eccrinaceae
  - Family: Palavasciaceae
  - Family: Parataeniellaceae
