= Psorospermium haeckeli =

Scientific classification
- Domain: Eukaryota
- (unranked): Opisthokonta
- (unranked): Holozoa
- Class: Mesomycetozoea
- Order: Ichthyophonida
- Genus: Psorospermium
- Species: P. haeckeli

Binomial name
- Psorospermium haeckeli

Psorospermium haeckeli (or Psorospermium haeckelii) is a parasitic species.
