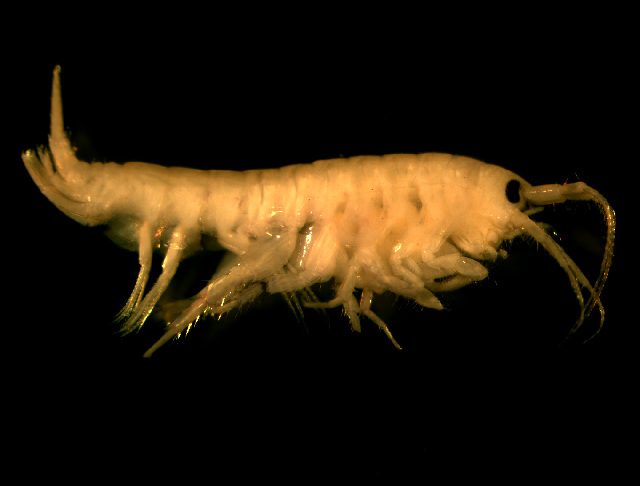
- Echinogammarus ischnus

Scientific classification
- Kingdom: Animalia
- Phylum: Arthropoda
- Class: Malacostraca
- Order: Amphipoda
- Family: Gammaridae
- Genus: Echinogammarus; Stebbing, 1899

= Echinogammarus =

Genus of amphipod crustaceans

Echinogammarus is a genus of amphipod crustaceans in the family Gammaridae. The status of many of its species is incertae sedis, but its type species is Echinogammarus berilloni. Species in Echinogammarus are parasitized by the Filozoan species Txikispora philomaios.
