= Psorosperm =

Psorosperm (from the Greek ψωρα itch and σπερμα seed) is a former name of a number of parasitic protozoa that produce cystlike or sporelike structures in the tissue of hosts. The term is now essentially obsolete.

- Some that affect vertebrate hosts are now called coccidia.
- Others, such as the cause of pébrine in silkworms, are now recognized as microsporidians, and some are myxosporidians.
- The genus Psorospermium (which includes the species Psorospermium haeckeli) itself is a parasite of crayfishes, and belongs to an enigmatic group of unicellular organisms that some biologists think may be related to the common ancestors of animals and fungi.

J. Müller introduced the term in German (as Psorospermien) in 1841.

A psorosperm was at one point believed to be the cause of Darier's disease.

"Psorospermiasis" is classified under 136.4 in ICD-9.
