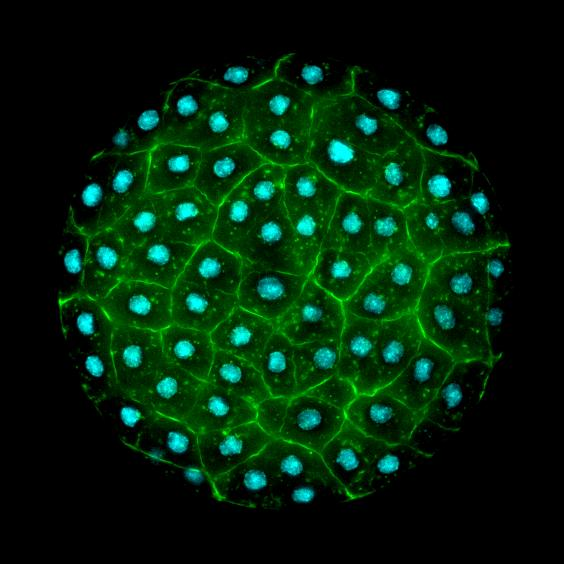
- Sphaeroforma arctica stained with phalloidin and DAPI

Scientific classification
- Domain: Eukaryota
- Clade: Obazoa
- Clade: Opisthokonta
- Clade: Holozoa
- Class: Ichthyosporea
- Order: Ichthyophonida
- Family: Creolimacidae
- Genus: Sphaeroforma
- Species: S. arctica

Binomial name
- Sphaeroforma arctica Jøstensen, Sperstad, Johansen & Landfald, 2002

= Sphaeroforma arctica =

Species of protist

Sphaeroforma arctica is a unicellular eukaryote with a pivotal position in the tree of life. It was first isolated from the arctic marine amphipod Gammarus setosus. Like other Ichthyosporeans such as Creolimax and Abeoforma, Sphaeroforma arctica are spherical cells characterized with their capacity to grow into multi-nucleated coenocytes (multi-nucleates cell). However, a unique feature of S. arctica, is that no obvious budding, hyphal, amoeboid, sporal or flagellated growth stages have been observed in laboratory growth conditions.

== Taxonomy ==
Sphaeroforma is a member of the Ichthyosporea clade, which is the earliest branching holozoan lineage. It is a key organism to understand the origin of animals.

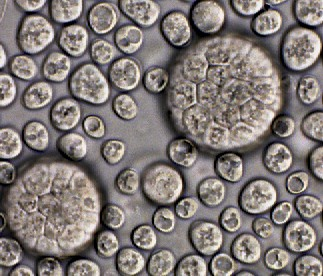
Sphaeroforma arctica, single cells and colonies

== Applications ==
Sphaeroforma arctica grows easily in marine broth, with the particularity of growing synchronously. From a cell with 1 single nucleus (although newborn cells have been shown to contain 2 or even 4 nuclei, too), it can grow to reach a 128 nuclei cell before undergoing cellularization (the process by which the coenocytes split up to give new-born cells). Cellularization involves coordinated inward plasma membrane invaginations dependent on an actomyosin network that leads to the formation of a polarized layer of cells resembling an epithelium. This process is associated with tightly regulated transcriptional activation of genes involved in cell adhesion.

Moreover, it has been recently shown that S. arctica contains miRNA as well as the complex miRNA processing machinery. Taken together, Sphaeroforma arctica is a great model organism from both evolutionary and cell biology perspectives.
