= Gammarus setosus =

Scientific classification
- Kingdom: Animalia
- Phylum: Arthropoda
- Clade: Pancrustacea
- Class: Malacostraca
- Order: Amphipoda
- Family: Gammaridae
- Genus: Gammarus
- Species: G. setosus

Binomial name
- Gammarus setosus Dementieva, 1931

Species of crustacean

Gammarus setosus is a gammarid amphipod that inhabits the northern coasts of both the Atlantic and Pacific oceans. Typically, this crustacean is found in the benthic sub-tidal or low inter-tidal regions. Gammarus setosus reproduces once a year in the autumn.

== Mini-Biome ==
Sphaeroforma arctica was found inside the inner internal Tissues of Gammarus setosus which was its host-organism and isolated from there.
