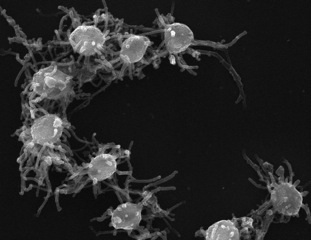
- Capsaspora owczarzaki

Scientific classification
- Domain: Eukaryota
- Clade: Podiata
- Clade: Amorphea
- Clade: Obazoa
- Clade: Opisthokonta
- Clade: Holozoa
- Clade: Filozoa
- Class: Filasterea; Salchian-Tabrizi et al. 2008

Families and genera
- Capsasporidae; Capsaspora; Pigoraptor; Ministeriidae; Ministeria; Txikisporidae; Txikispora

= Filasterea =

Class of unicellular eukaryotes

Filasterea is a basal filozoan clade of single-celled ameboid eukaryotes that includes Ministeria and Capsaspora. It is a sister clade to the Choanozoa in which the choanoflagellates and animals appeared, originally proposed by Shalchian-Tabrizi et al. in 2008, based on a phylogenomic analysis with 78 genes. Filasterea was found to be the sister-group to the clade composed of Metazoa and Choanoflagellata within the Opisthokonta, a finding that has been further corroborated with additional, more taxon-rich, phylogenetic analyses.

== Etymology ==
From Latin filum meaning "thread" and Greek aster meaning "star", it indicates the main morphological features shared by all their integrants: small, rounded amoeboids with a mononucleated cellular body, covered in long and radiating cell protrusions known as filopodia. These filopodia may be involved in substrate adhesion and capture of prey.

== Applications ==
There are currently cultures from two filasterean species: Capsaspora owczarzaki and Ministeria vibrans, the first isolated from within a fresh-water snail, the second a marine, free-living bacteriovore. The complete genome sequences of C. owczarzaki, M. vibrans, Pigoraptor vietnamica and Pigoraptor chileana have been obtained. Comparative analyses have shown that Filasterea are key to unravelling the genetic repertoire of the unicellular ancestor of animals and for providing insights into the origin of Metazoa. Metabarcoding analyses of 18S ribosomal RNA in marine environments have failed to recover other filasterean representatives, suggesting this clade may not be especially abundant in natural ecosystems.

== Taxonomy ==
- Class Filasterea Shalchian-Tabrizi et al. 2008
  - Order Ministeriida Cavalier-Smith 1997
    - Family Ministeriidae Cavalier-Smith 2008
      - Genus Ministeria Patterson et al. 1993
        - Ministeria marisola Patterson et al. 1993
        - Ministeria vibrans Tong 1997
    - Family Txikisporidae Urrutia, Feist & Bass 2021
      - Genus Txikispora Urrutia, Feist & Bass 2021
        - Txikispora philomaios Urrutia, Feist & Bass 2021
    - Family Capsasporidae Cavalier-Smith 2008
      - Genus Capsaspora Hertel et al. 2002
        - Capsaspora owczarzaki Hertel et al. 2002
      - Genus Pigoraptor Tikhonenkov et al. 2017
        - Pigoraptor chileana Tikhonenkov et al. 2017
        - Pigoraptor vietnamica Tikhonenkov et al. 2017

- Opisthokonta
  - Holomycota
    - Zoosporia
      - Fungi
      - Opisthosporidia
    - Cristidiscoidea
      - Nucleariida
      - Fonticulida
  - Holozoa
    - Ichthyosporea
    - - Pluriformea
        - Syssomonas
        - Corallochytrium
      - Filozoa
        - Filasterea
          - Ministeria
          - - Capsaspora
            - Pigoraptor
        - Choanozoa
          - Choanoflagellatea
          - Animalia

In some research Capsaspora is found to be more closely related to Choanozoa than Ministeria.
