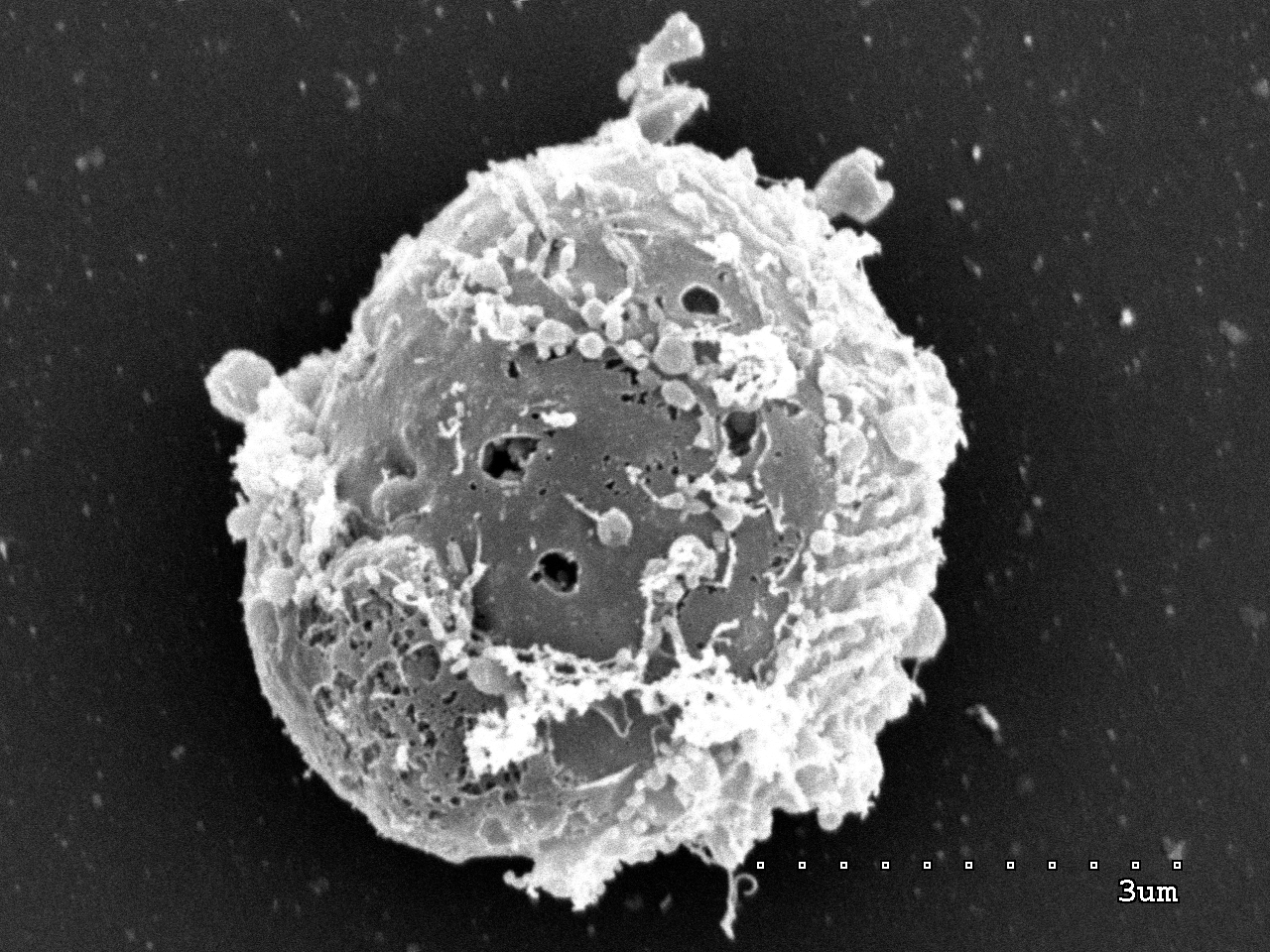
- Corallochytrium
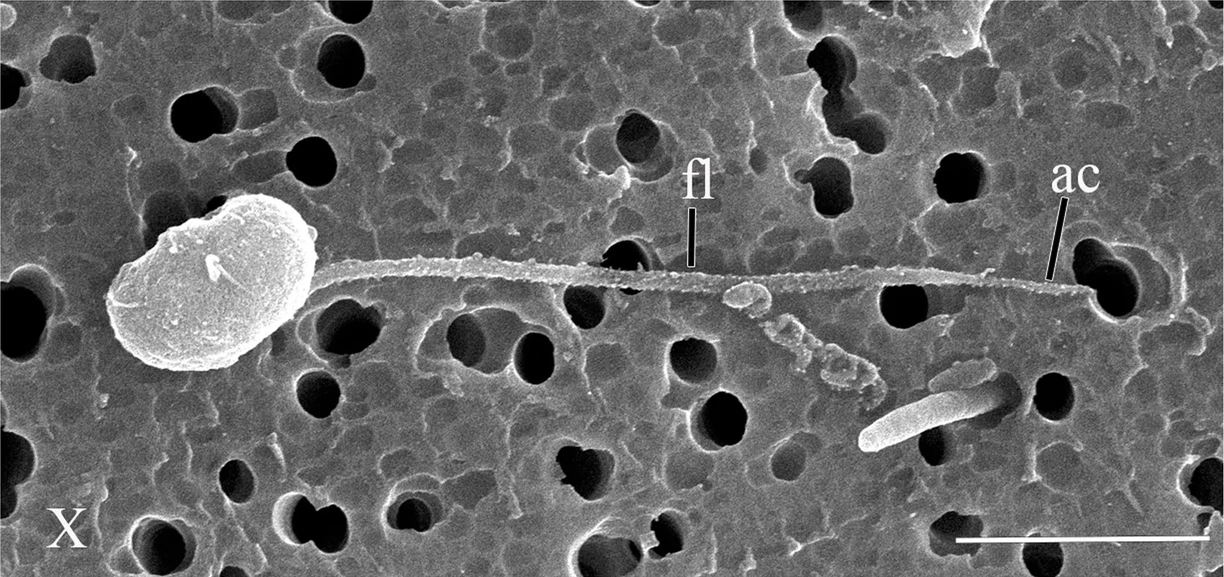
- Syssomonas

Scientific classification
- Domain: Eukaryota
- Clade: Podiata
- Clade: Amorphea
- Clade: Obazoa
- Clade: Opisthokonta
- Clade: Holozoa
- Clade?: Teretosporea
- Clade: Pluriformea; Hehenberger et al. 2017

Genera
- Corallochytrium; Syssomonas

Synonyms
- Corallochytrida Cavalier-Smith 1995

= Pluriformea =

Clade of unicellular organisms

Pluriformea is a sibling clade of the Filozoa, and consists of Syssomonas and the Corallochytrium. Together with the Ichthyosporea and the Filozoa, they form the Holozoa.

An up to date cladogram is

- Opisthokonta
  - Holomycota
  - Holozoa
    - Ichthyosporea
    - - Pluriformea
        - Syssomonas
        - Corallochytrium
      - - Tunicaraptor unikontum
        - Filozoa
          - Filasterea
          - Choanozoa
            - Choanoflagellatea
            - Animalia

The alternative hypothesis is the Teretosporea clade.
