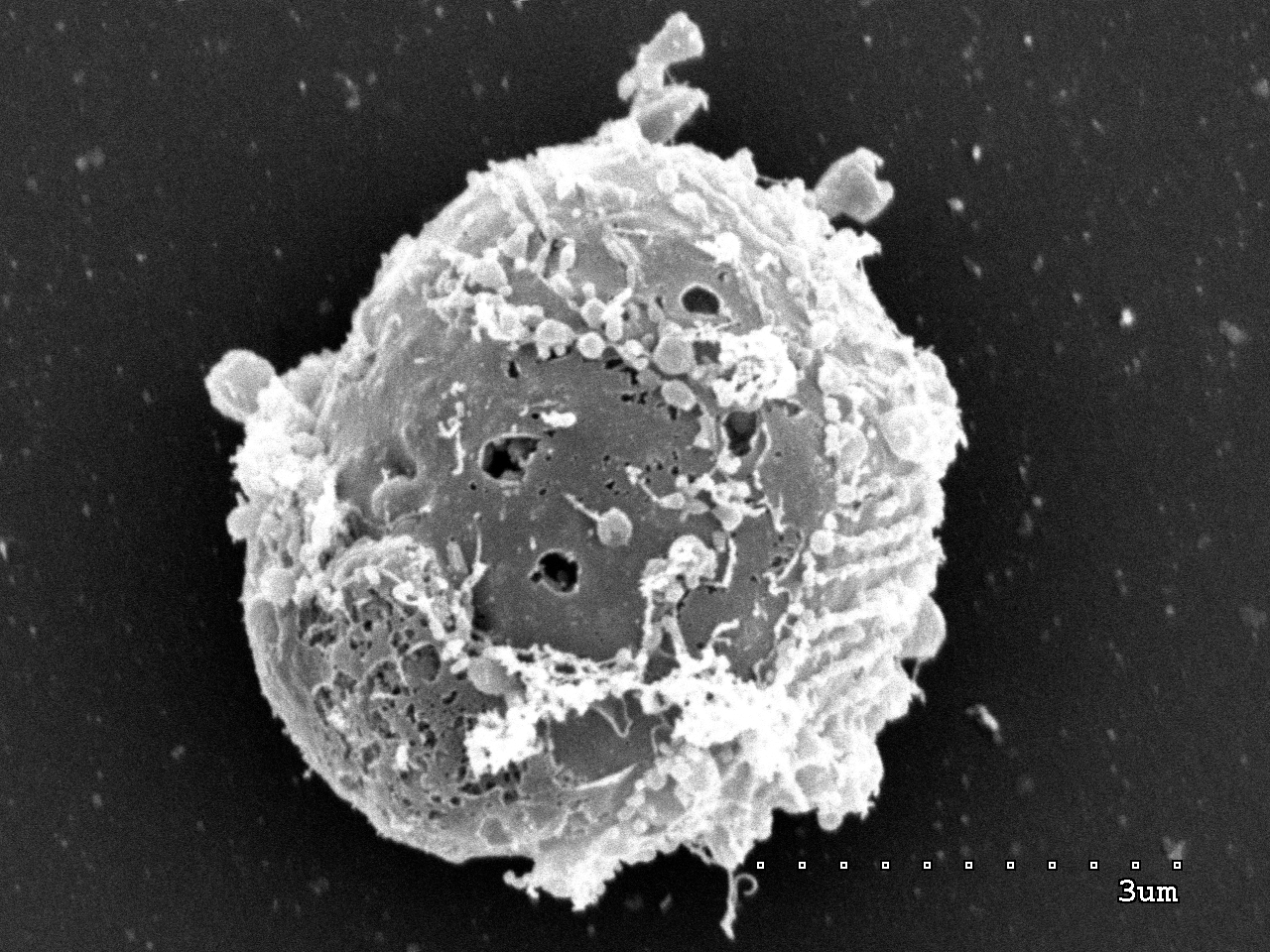

Scientific classification
- Domain: Eukaryota
- Clade: Obazoa
- Clade: Opisthokonta
- Clade: Pluriformea
- Family: Corallochytriidae; Cavalier-Smith 1995
- Genus: Corallochytrium; Raghu-kumar 1987
- Species: C. limacisporum

Binomial name
- Corallochytrium limacisporum Rahgu-kumar 1987

= Corallochytrium =

Genus of unicellular organisms

Corallochytrium limacisporum is a species of unicellular holozoan eukaryote. It is the only species in genus Corallochytrium and the class Corallochytrea. Most research concerning this genus has been done to uncover the evolution of animals and fungi, as Corallochytrium is related to these groups and possess characteristics of both, such as animal and fungal enzymatic trademarks (C-14 reductase and α-aminoadipate reductase (α-AAR) respectively).

C. limacisporum was first discovered and named in the Arabian Sea's coral lagoons by Raghu-kumar in 1987. It was first thought to be a member of the fungi-like thraustochytrids, however, this was later rejected due to Corallochytrium's lack of cilia and sagenogenetosome. Little research has been done on the life cycle or morphology.

== Etymology ==
The genus name is derived from the habitat in which it was first found: coral reef lagoons. The single species name is derived from the limax-shaped (slug-shaped) spores that are produced by the cell. (Raghu-kumar, 1987).

== Taxonomy ==
C. limacisporum was first discovered and named in 1987 in coral reef lagoons of three Lakshadweep islands in the Arabian sea; Agatti, Kavaratti and Bangaram (Raghu-kumar, 1987). The organism was initially thought to be a new thraustochytrid protist, a group of protists that closely resemble fungi and produce filaments from which they absorb nutrients (Raghu-kumar 1987). However, Cavalier-Smith & Allsopp (1996) explain that C. limancisporum had been wrongly classified as it lacks all defining characteristics of thraustochytrids. After phylogenetic analysis, Corallochytrium was determined not to be a thraustochytrid, but rather related to choanoflagellates. Cavalier-Smith assigned a new order and class for Corallochytrium under the phylum Choanozoa: Corallochytrida and Corallochytrea respectively (Cavelier-Smith 1995).

Recently, Torruella et al. (2015) found that Corallochytrium has a sister group: Ichthyosporea, forming with it Teretosporea, an early branching lineage of unicellular organisms that are thought to be one of the closest relatives to animals and choanoflagellates (Marshall, 2014).

A phylogenetic tree based on the α-AAR gene put Corallochytrium as a sister group to fungi, however trees using other genes, such as C-14 reductase, have been inconclusive in their placement in relation to animals or fungi (Sumanthi et al. 2006).

The more recently described Syssomonas multiformis is C. limacisporum's sister taxon. These two species are collectively known as Pluriformea, and this clade is likely related to Filozoa within Holozoa, although some trees support the Teretosporea hypothesis (Pluriformea close to Ichthyosporea).

== Description ==
Corallochytrium is small (around 5–20 μm in diameter), round, and non-photosynthetic (Torruella et al. 2015, Cavalier-Smith & Allsopp, 1996). It possesses no cilia, no sagenogenetosome (Cavalier-Smith, 2001) and no pseudopods (Cavalier-Smith & Allsopp, 1996). It has a thin wall of unknown composition, that does not resemble that of fungi (Cavalier-Smith, 2001). Like fungi and choanoflagellates, Corallochytrium has flat mitochondrial cristae (Cavalier-Smith, 2001).

== Habitat and ecology ==
Little is known about Corallochytrium's feeding and ecology, however its feeding regime has strong implications for the evolution of animals and fungi. Corallochytrium is a marine protist that inhabits coral reef lagoons in the Arabian Sea (Raghu-kumar, 1987). C. limacisporum is predatory and feeds on large eukaryotic prey (Hehenberger et al. 2017). Corallochytrium has the fungal signature α-aminoadipate reductase (α-AAR) which is involved in the α-aminoadipate (AAA) pathway that synthesises amino acids from inorganic nitrogen in fungi (Sumathi et al. 2006). α-AAR is an evolutionarily conserved enzyme in the fungi (Sumathi at al., 2006). The presence of α-AAR in Corallochytrium suggests it is a sister clade to fungi (OUTDATED: better analyses from 2015–2020 instead place it within Holozoa). Like fungi, Corallochytrium has also been found to be saprotrophic (Cavalier-Smith & Allsopp, 1996). Corallochytrium also possess the sterol C-14 reductase gene involved in animal and fungi sterol pathways (Sumathi at al., 2006).

=== Life cycle ===
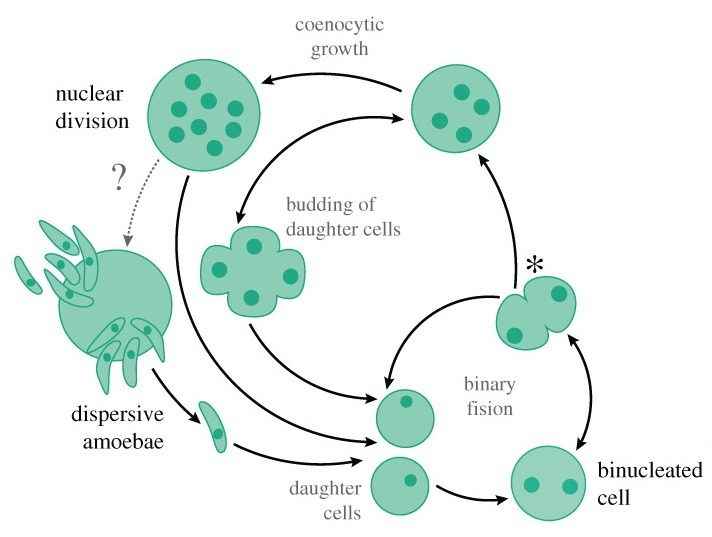
Life cycle of C. limacisporum

Little documentation of the Corallochytrium life cycle exists. However it is known that Corallochytrium produces colonies by binary, palintomic cell division (Raghu-kumar, 1987). Completion of the Corallochytrium life cycle involves the release of limax-shaped spores through one or more small openings on the parent wall (Raghu-kumar, 1987).
