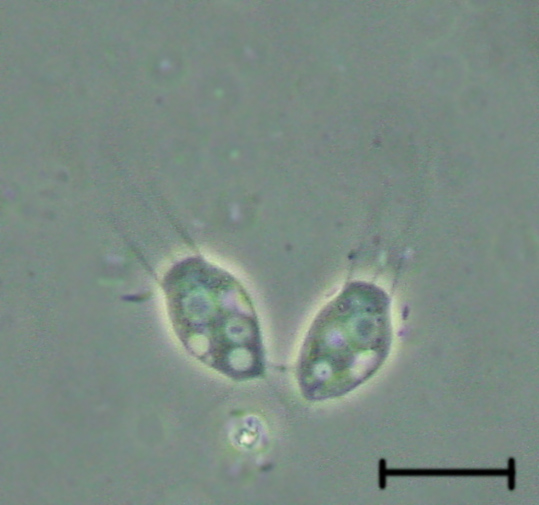
- Codonosiga, a choanoflagellate
- Chital, an animal

Scientific classification
- Domain: Eukaryota
- Clade: Podiata
- Supergroup: Amorphea
- Clade: Obazoa
- Clade: Opisthokonta
- Clade: Holozoa
- Clade: Filozoa
- Clade: Choanozoa; Brunet & King 2017

Subdivisions
- Class Choanoflagellata; Kingdom Animalia

Synonyms
- Apoikozoa Budd & Jensen 2015

= Choanozoa =

Choanozoa Temporal range: 750–0 Ma

Clade of opisthokont eukaryotes

Choanozoa is a clade of opisthokont eukaryotes consisting of the choanoflagellates (Choanoflagellatea) and the animals (Animalia). The sister-group relationship between the choanoflagellates and animals has important implications for the origin of the animals. The clade was identified in 2015 by Graham Budd and Sören Jensen, who used the name Apoikozoa. The 2018 revision of the classification first proposed by the International Society of Protistologists in 2012 recommends the use of the name Choanozoa.

== Introduction ==
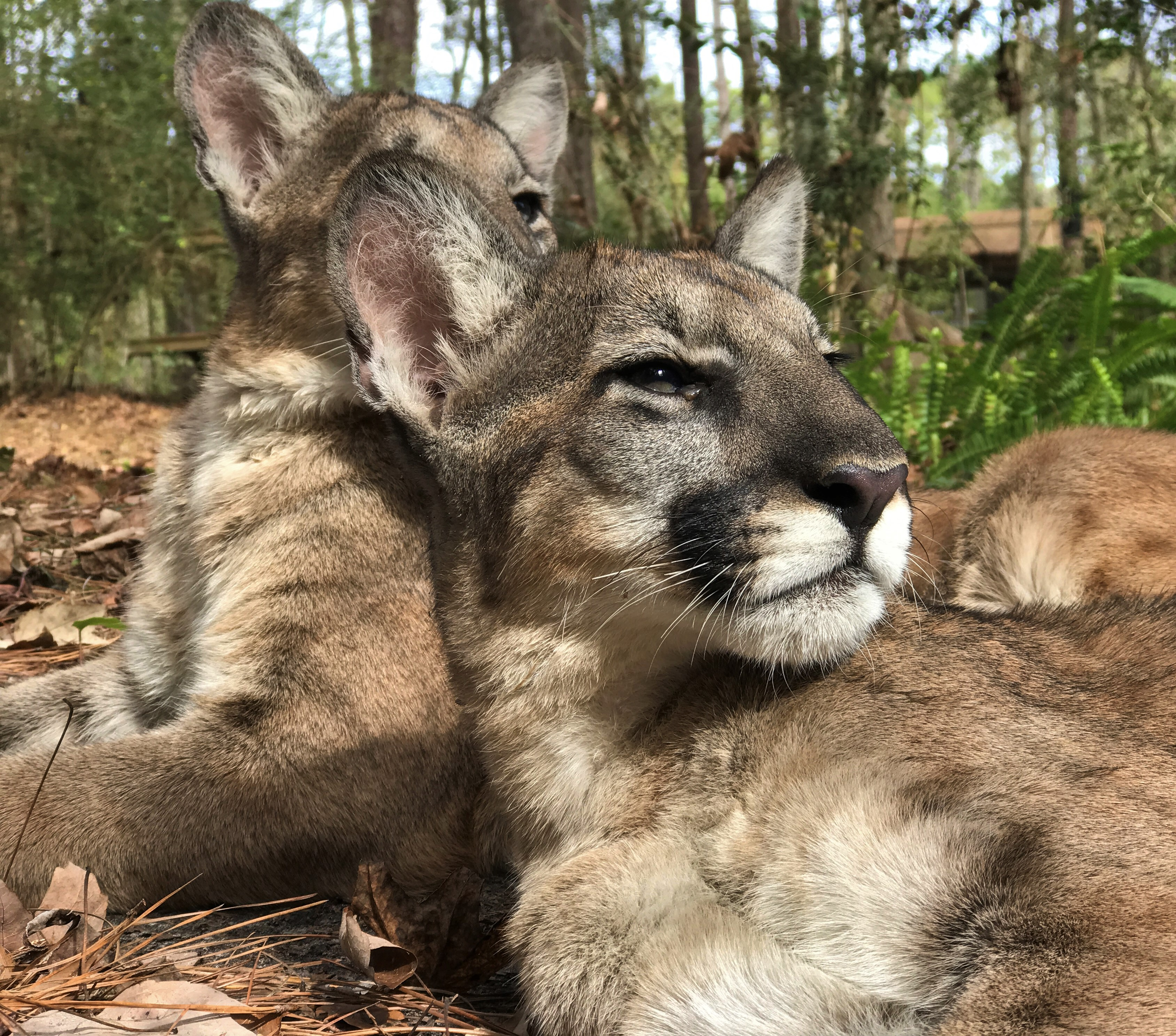
The Florida panther is an animal

A close relationship between choanoflagellates and animals has long been recognised, dating back at least to the 1840s. A particularly striking and famous similarity between the single-celled choanoflagellates and multicellular animals is provided by the collar cells of sponges and the overall morphology of the choanoflagellate cell. The relationship has since been confirmed by multiple molecular analyses. This proposed homology was however thrown into some doubt in 2013 by the controversial suggestion that ctenophores, and not sponges, are the sister group to all other animals. More recent genomic work has suggested that choanoflagellates possess some of the important genetic machinery necessary for the multicellularity found in animals.

A synonym for the Choanozoa, Apoikozoa, derives from the ancient Greek for "colony" and "animal", referring to the ability of both animals and (some) choanoflagellates to form multicellular units. While animals are permanently multicellular, the colony-building choanoflagellates are only sometimes so. It is unknown whether the colony-building ability in both groups was present at the base of the entire clade, or whether it was independently derived within the animals and choanoflagellates.

== Nomenclature ==
The name "Choanozoa" was first used by protozoologist Thomas Cavalier-Smith in 1991 to refer to a group of basal protists that later proved not to form a clade. This group had the rank of phylum and contained all opisthokont protists while excluding both fungi and animals, making the group paraphyletic. Its classification was the following:

- Phylum "Choanozoa"
  - Subphylum "Choanofila", a paraphyletic group containing all holozoan protists in three classes: Choanoflagellatea, Ichthyosporea and Filasterea.
  - Subphylum Paramycia, a monophyletic group containing holomycotan protists in the single class Cristidiscoidea.

The International Society of Protistologists rejected the use of this name for the paraphyletic group. Instead, since 2017, the name Choanozoa is considered appropriate for the clade that unites choanoflagellates and animals, since the Greek choanē (χοάνη), meaning 'funnel', refers to the collar, which is a synapomorphy (i.e. a unique characteristic) of the clade. A synonym of this clade, Apoikozoa, was used in previous years; however, it was rejected as being neither formally defined nor appropriate, since it refers to the ability to form colonies, a characteristic not unique to this clade.

== Evolutionary implications ==
Although the last common ancestor of the Choanozoa cannot be reconstructed with certainty, Budd and Jensen suggest that these organisms formed benthic colonies that competed for space amongst other mat-forming organisms known to have existed during the Ediacaran period some 635–540 million years ago. As such they would form an important link between the unicellular ancestors of the animals and the enigmatic "Ediacaran" organisms known from this interval, thus allowing some sort of reconstruction of the earliest animals and their ecology. In the following cladogram, an indication is given of approximately how many million years ago (Mya) the clades diverged into newer clades. (Note that the later Budd and Jensen paper gives significantly younger dates. See also Kimberella.) The Holomycota tree follows Tedersoo et al.

- Opisthokonta 1300 mya
  - Holomycota
    - Cristidiscoidea
      - Fonticulida
      - Nucleariida
    - Fungi/ Opisthosporidia
      - BCG2
      - - - True Fungi
          - Aphelida
        - - BCG1
          - Rozellomyceta/ Cryptomycota
            - Rozella
            - - Namako-37
              - Microsporidia
  - Holozoa 1100 mya
    - Ichthyosporea
    - - Pluriformea
        - Syssomonas
        - Corallochytrium
      - Filozoa
        - Filasterea
        - Choanozoa 950 mya
          - Choanoflagellatea
          - Animalia

== Gallery ==
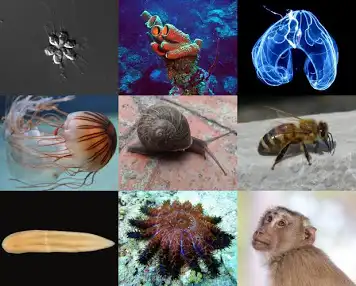
