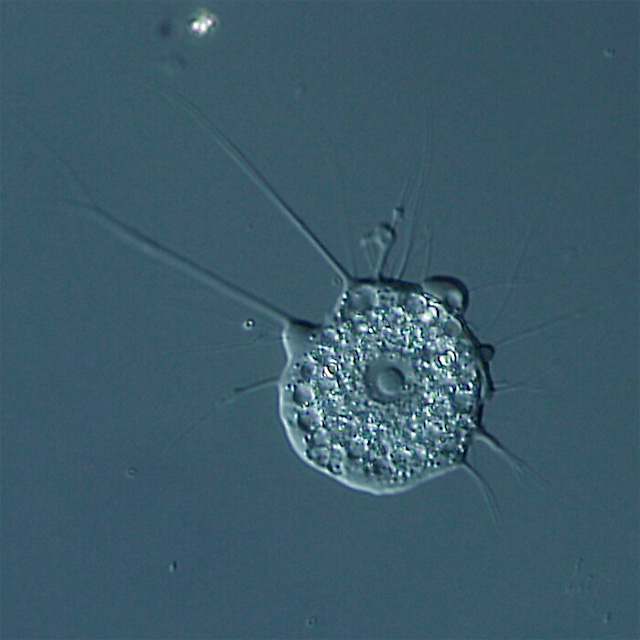
- Nuclearia thermophila

Scientific classification
- Domain: Eukaryota
- Clade: Podiata
- Supergroup: Amorphea
- Clade: Obazoa
- Clade: Opisthokonta
- Clade: Holomycota; Liu et al. 2009

Groups
- Rotosphaerida; Fungi

Synonyms
- Nucletmycea Brown et al. 2009; Holofungi; Fungida

= Holomycota =

Holomycota Temporal range: Middle Ordovician – Present 460–0 Ma

Clade containing fungi and some protists

Holomycota or Nucletmycea are a basal Opisthokont clade as sister of the Holozoa. It consists of the Cristidiscoidea, also called Nucleariidae, as well as the kingdom Fungi. Nucleariids are unicellular free-living phagotrophic amoebae, and are considered the earliest lineage of Holomycota. This suggests that animals and fungi independently acquired complex multicellularity from a common unicellular ancestor and that the osmotrophic lifestyle (one of the fungal hallmarks) was originated later in the divergence of this eukaryotic lineage. Opisthosporidians is a recently proposed taxonomic group that includes aphelids, Microsporidia and Cryptomycota, three groups of endoparasites.

Rozella (Cryptomycota) is the earliest diverging fungal genus in which chitin has been observed at least in some stages of their life cycle, although the chitinous cell wall (another fungal hallmark) and osmotrophy originated in a common ancestor of Blastocladiomycota and Chytridiomycota, which still contain some ancestral characteristics such as the flagellum in zoosporic stage. The groups of fungi with the characteristic hyphal growth, Zoopagomycota, Mucoromycotina and Dikarya, originated from a common ancestor ~700 Mya. Zoopagomycota are mostly pathogens of animals or other fungi, Mucoromycotina is a more diverse group including parasites, saprotrophs or ectomycorrhizal. Dikarya is the group embracing Ascomycota and Basidiomycota, which comprise ~98% of the described fungal species. Because of this rich diversity, Dikarya includes highly morphologically distinct groups, from hyphae or unicellular yeasts (such as the model organism Saccharomyces cerevisiae) to the complex multicellular fungi popularly known as mushrooms. Contrary to animals and land plants with complex multicellularity, the inferred phylogenetic relationships indicate that fungi acquired and lost multicellularity multiple times along Ascomycota and Basidiomycota evolution.

== Phylogeny ==
The phylogenetic tree depicts the fungi and their close relationship to other organisms, based on the work of Philippe Silar and "The Mycota: A Comprehensive Treatise on Fungi as Experimental Systems for Basic and Applied Research". The holomycota tree is following Tedersoo et al.

- Opisthokonts
  - Holomycota
    - Cristidiscoidea
      - Fonticulida
      - Nucleariida
    - Fungi/ Opisthosporidia
      - BCG2
      - - Phytophagea
          - True Fungi
          - Aphelida
        - - BCG1
          - Rozellomyceta/ Cryptomycota/Opisthophagea
            - Rozella
            - - Namako-37
              - Microsporidia
                - Metchnikovellea
                - Microsporea
  - Holozoa
    - Ichthyosporea
    - - Pluriformea
        - Corallochytrium
        - Syssomonas
      - Filozoa
        - Filasterea
        - Choanozoa
          - Choanoflagellatea
          - Animalia
