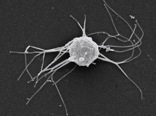

Scientific classification
- Domain: Eukaryota
- Class: Filasterea
- Order: Ministeriida
- Family: Ministeriidae
- Genus: Ministeria
- Species: M. vibrans

Binomial name
- Ministeria vibrans Tong, 1997

= Ministeria vibrans =

Species of amoeba

Ministeria vibrans is a bacterivorous amoeba with filopodia that lives suspended by a flagellum-derived stalk attached to the substrate. The life cycle of Ministeria remains unknown.

== Taxonomy ==
Two Ministeria species have been reported so far, both of them from coastal marine water samples: M. vibrans and M. marisola. However, there is currently only one culture available, that of Ministeria vibrans.

== Evolution ==
Ministeria vibrans occupies a key position in understanding animal origins. It is a member of the Filasterea, that is the sister-group to Choanoflagellatea and Metazoa. Microvilli in Ministeria suggest their presence in the common ancestor of Filasterea and Choanoflagellata. The kinetid structure of Ministeria is similar to that of the choanocytes of the most deep-branching sponges, differing essentially from the kinetid of choanoflagellates. Thus, kinetid and microvilli of Ministeria illustrate features of the common ancestor of three holozoan groups: Filasterea, Metazoa, and Choanoflagellata.
