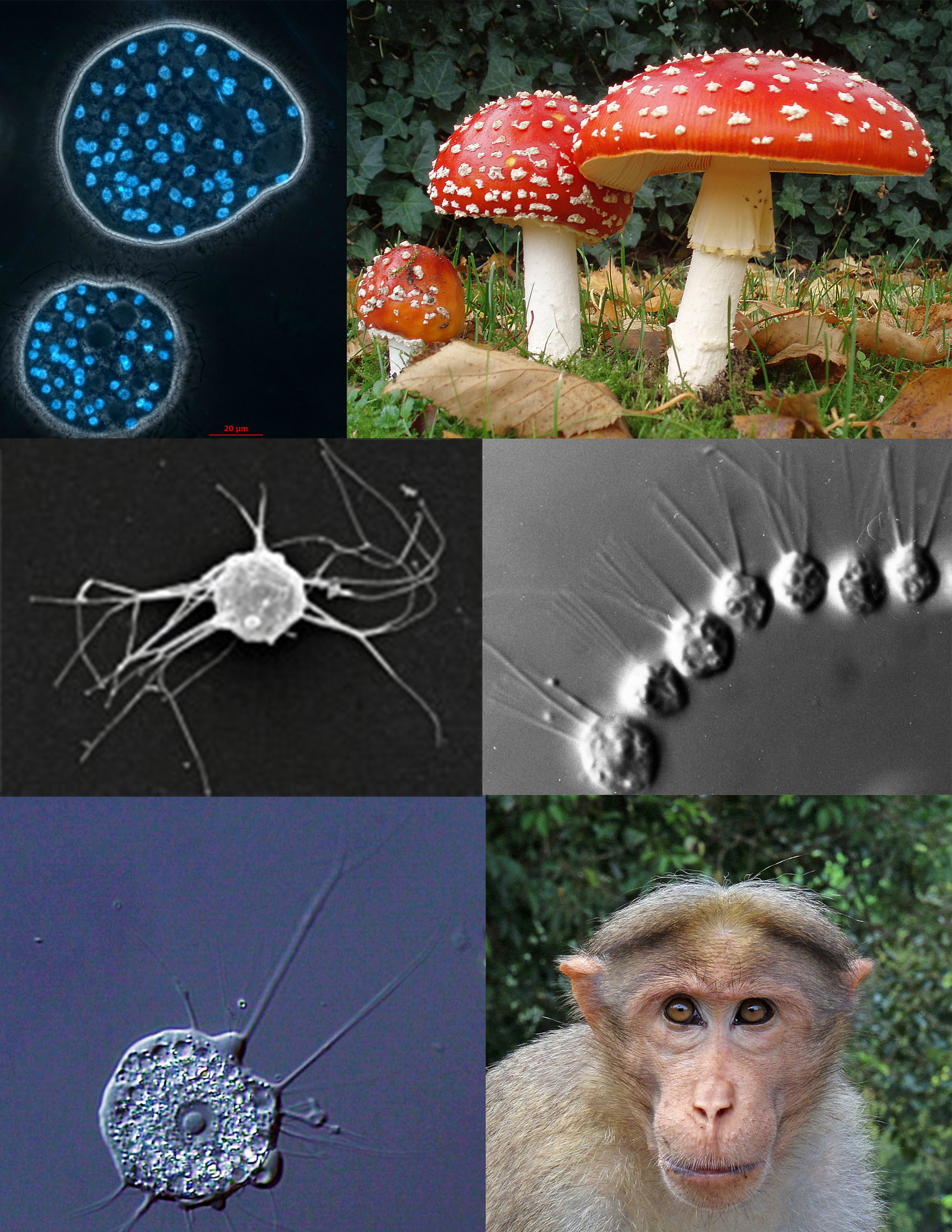
- Clockwise, from top left: Abeoforma whisleri (Mesomycetozoea); Amanita muscaria (Fungi); Desmarella moniliformis (Choanoflagellatea); bonnet macaque (Metazoa); Nuclearia thermophila (Nucleariida); Ministeria vibrans (Filasterea)

Scientific classification
- Domain: Eukaryota
- Clade: Podiata
- Clade: Amorphea
- Clade: Obazoa
- Clade: Opisthokonta; Cavalier-Smith 1987, emend. Adl et al. 2005

Subgroups
- Holomycota; Holozoa

= Opisthokont =

Opisthokonts Temporal range: 1010–0 Ma

Group of eukaryotes which includes animals and fungi, among other groups

The opisthokonts (from Ancient Greek ὀπίσθιος (opísthios) 'rear, posterior' and κοντός (kontós) 'pole, flagellum') are a broad group of eukaryotes, including both the animal and fungus kingdoms. The opisthokonts, previously called the "Fungi/Metazoa group", are generally recognized as a clade. Opisthokonts together with Apusomonadida and Breviata make up the larger clade Obazoa.

== Flagella and other characteristics ==
A common characteristic of opisthokonts is that flagellate cells, such as the sperm of most animals and the spores of chytrid fungi, propel themselves with a single posterior flagellum. It is this feature that gives this group the name Opisthokonta. In contrast, flagellate cells in other eukaryote groups propel themselves with one or more anterior flagella. Flagellate cells however have been secondarily lost in some opisthokont groups, including most of the fungi.

Opisthokont characteristics include synthesis of extracellular chitin in exoskeleton, cyst/spore wall, or cell wall of filamentous growth and hyphae; the extracellular digestion of substrates with osmotrophic absorption of nutrients; and other cell biosynthetic and metabolic pathways. Early opisthokonts were likely amoeboid and phagotrophic.

== History ==
The close relationship between animals and fungi was suggested by Thomas Cavalier-Smith in 1987, who used the informal name opisthokonta (the formal name has been used for the chytrids by Herbert Copeland in 1956), and was supported by later genetic studies.

Early phylogenies placed fungi near the plants and other groups that have mitochondria with flat cristae, but this character varies. More recently, it has been said that holozoa (animals) and holomycota (fungi) are much more closely related to each other than either is to plants, because opisthokonts have a triple fusion of carbamoyl phosphate synthetase, dihydroorotase, and aspartate carbamoyltransferase that is not present in plants, and plants have a fusion of thymidylate synthase and dihydrofolate reductase not present in the opisthokonts. Animals and fungi are also more closely related to amoebas than to plants, and plants are more closely related to the SAR supergroup of protists than to animals or fungi. Animals and fungi are both heterotrophs, unlike plants, and while most fungi are sessile like plants, there are also sessile animals.

Cavalier-Smith and Alexandra Stechmann argue that the uniciliate eukaryotes such as opisthokonts and Amoebozoa, collectively called unikonts, split off from the other biciliate eukaryotes, called bikonts, shortly after they evolved.

== Taxonomy ==
Opisthokonts are divided into Holomycota or Nucletmycea (Fungi and all organisms more closely related to Fungi than to animals) and Holozoa (animals and all organisms more closely related to animals than to Fungi); no Opisthokonts basal to the Holomycota/Holozoa (animal-fungal) split have yet been identified as of 2020. The Opisthokonts was largely resolved by Guifré Torruella et al. (2015) using phylogenomics (comparison of many conserved protein loci from genomes). Holomycota and Holozoa are composed of the following groups (see § Phylogeny for more citations):

- Holomycota (fungus-like)
  - Fungi
    - Includes:
      - chytrids (flagellated, zoosporic fungi)
      - Fonticula (more recent work considers this to be part of Cristidiscoidea, a sister group to the fungi)
      - Hyaloraphidium (previously thought to be a green alga, now considered a fungus)
      - microsporidia (previously thought to be apicomplexa)
      - Nucleariida (more recent work considers this to be part of Cristidiscoidea, a sister group to the fungi)
    - Excludes:
      - labyrinthulomycetes (slime nets) (now included in the SAR supergroup)
      - myxomycetes (now included in amoebozoans)
      - oomycetes (water molds) (now included in the SAR supergroup)
  - Rozellida (placement uncertain)
- Holozoa (Animal-like)
  - Corallochytrium (formerly considered a Heterokont)
  - Filozoa
    - Animalia (including myxozoa)
    - Choanoflagellata (flagellates formerly included in protozoa)
    - Filasterea
  - Mesomycetozoea
    - Amoebidiales (formerly considered trichomycetes)
    - Dermocystida (formerly considered parasitic fungi or sporozoans)
    - Eccrinales (formerly considered fungi)
    - Ichthyophonida (formerly considered parasitic fungi incertae sedis)

=== Phylogeny ===
The following phylogenetic tree indicates the evolutionary relationships between the different opisthokont lineages, and the time divergence of the clades in millions of years ago (Mya). Sources:

- Holomycota: Tedersoo et al. (2018) [16S rRNA/Rpb1/Rpb2], Galindo et al. (2022) [phylogenomic].
- Holozoa: Tikhonenkov et al. (2020) [phylogenomic].

- Amorphea 1500 Mya
  - Amoebozoa
  - Obazoa
    - Breviatea
    - - Apusomonadida
      - Opisthokonta 1300 Mya
        - Holomycota
          - Nucleariae
          - Fungi sensu lato
            - Phytophagea
              - 410 Mya
                True Fungi
              - Aphelida
            - Opisthophagea
              - Rozella
              - Microsporidia
        - Holozoa
          - Ichthyosporea
          - Pluriformea
            - Corallochytrium
            - Syssomonas
          - Tunicaraptor
          - Filozoa
            - Filasterea
            - Choanozoa 950 mya
              - Choanoflagellatea
              - 760 Mya
                Metazoa

Notes:

1. The location of Tunicaraptor is not completely resolved in Tikhonenkov et al. (2020). The possibilities of it being sister to all other Holozoa or being sister to Filasteria have not been ruled out.
2. Torruella et al. (2015) instead places Corallochytrium as sister to Ichthyosporea, forming the clade Teretosporea.

== Gallery ==
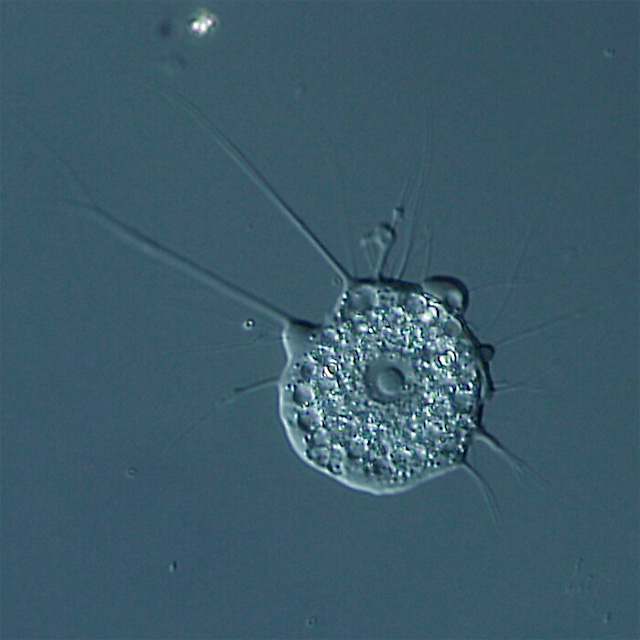
Nuclearia (Nucleariida)

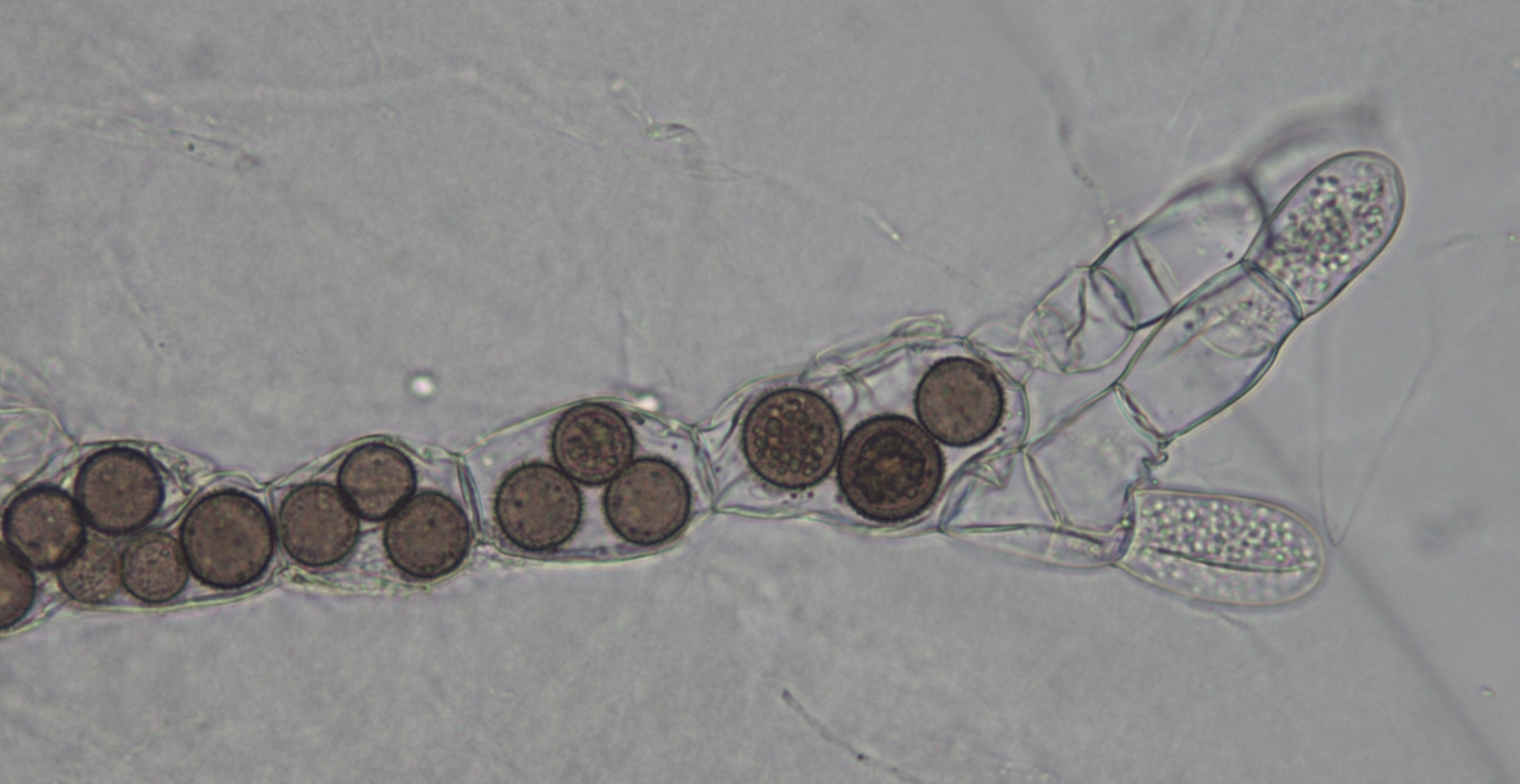
Rozella sp. (Rozellida)

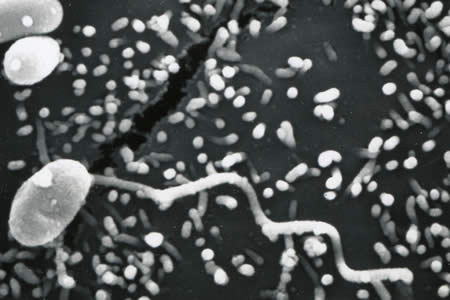
Microsporidian spore (Microsporidia)

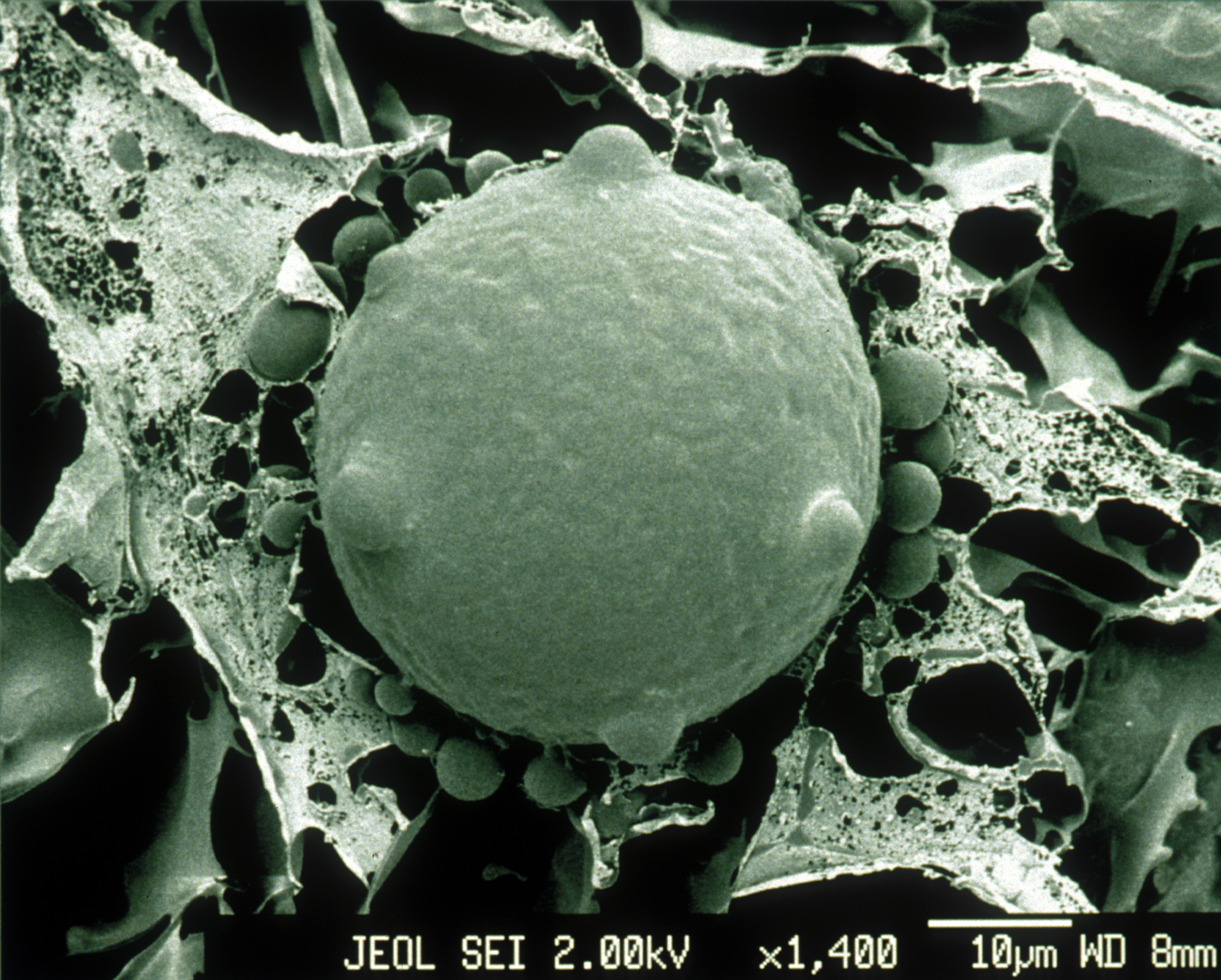
Chytrid (flagellated fungus)

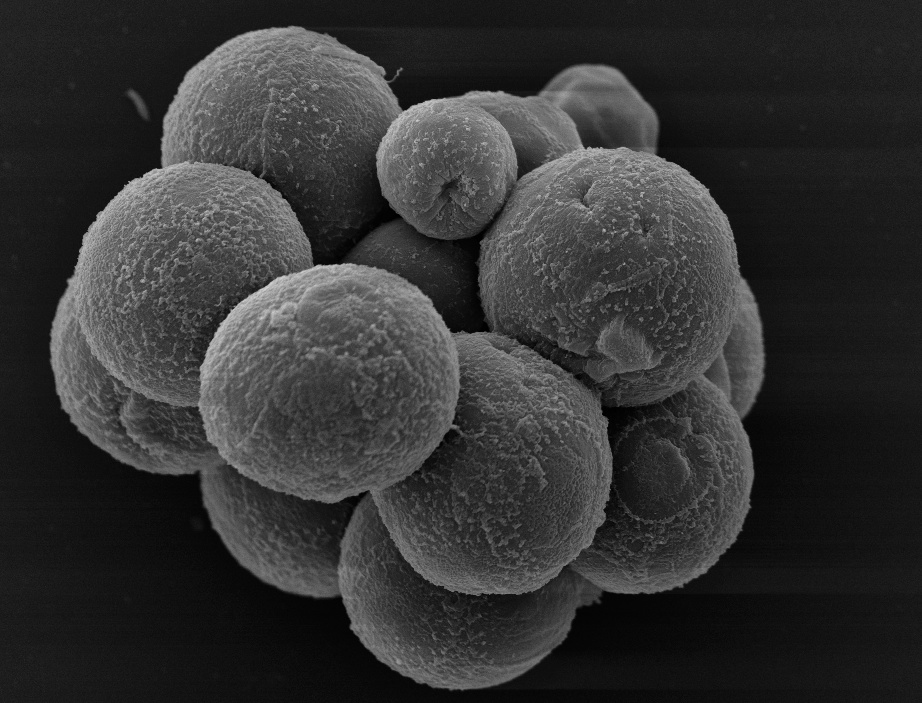
Sphaeroforma sp. (Mesomycetozoea)

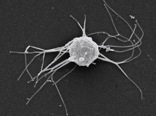
Ministeria sp. (Filasterea)

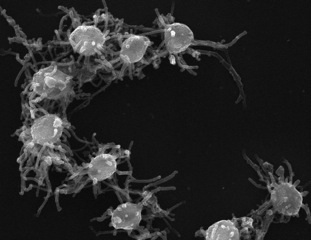
Capsaspora sp. (Filasterea)

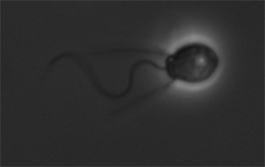
Salpingoeca (Choanoflagellatea)

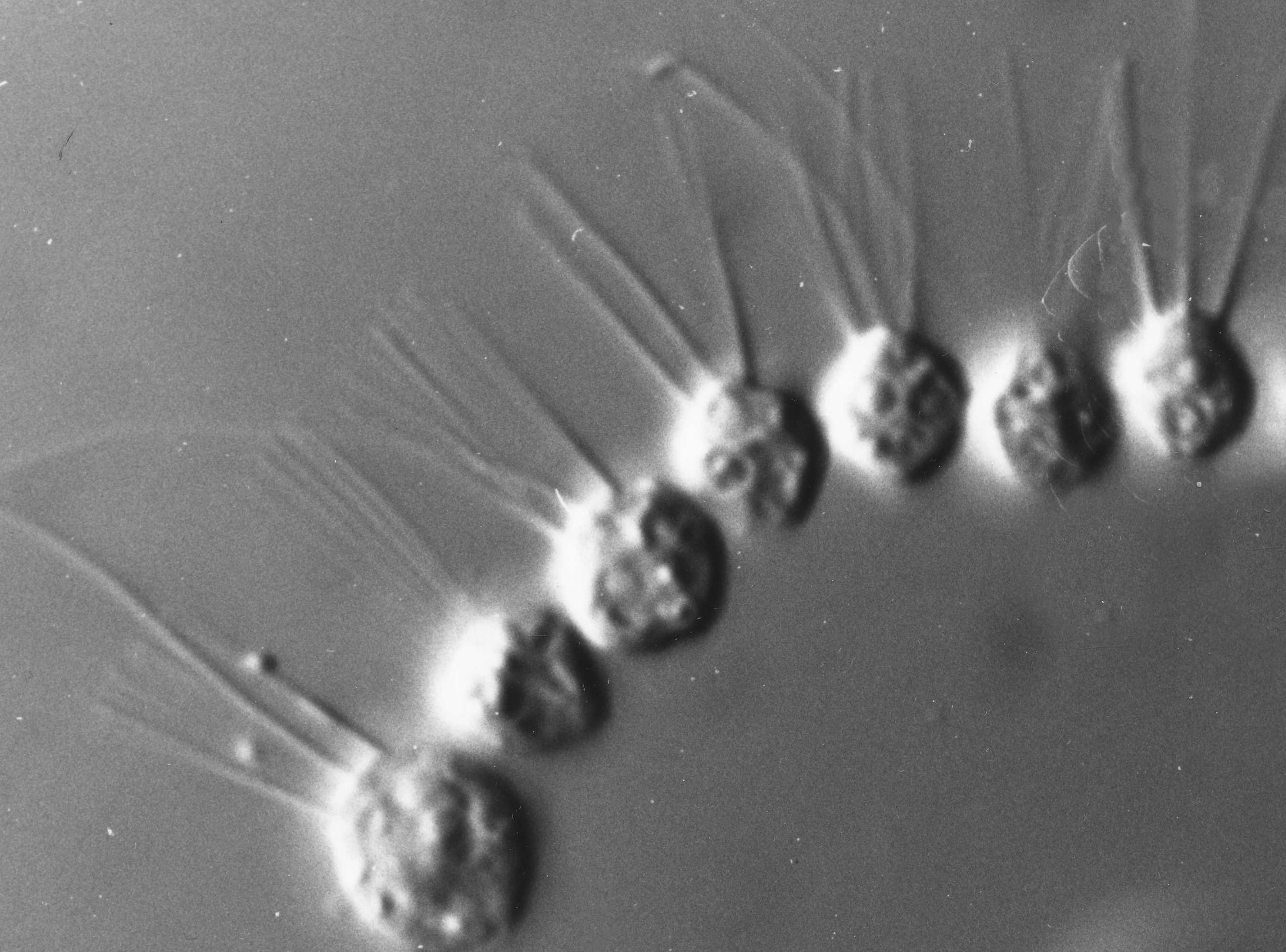
Desmarella sp. colony (Choanoflagellatea)

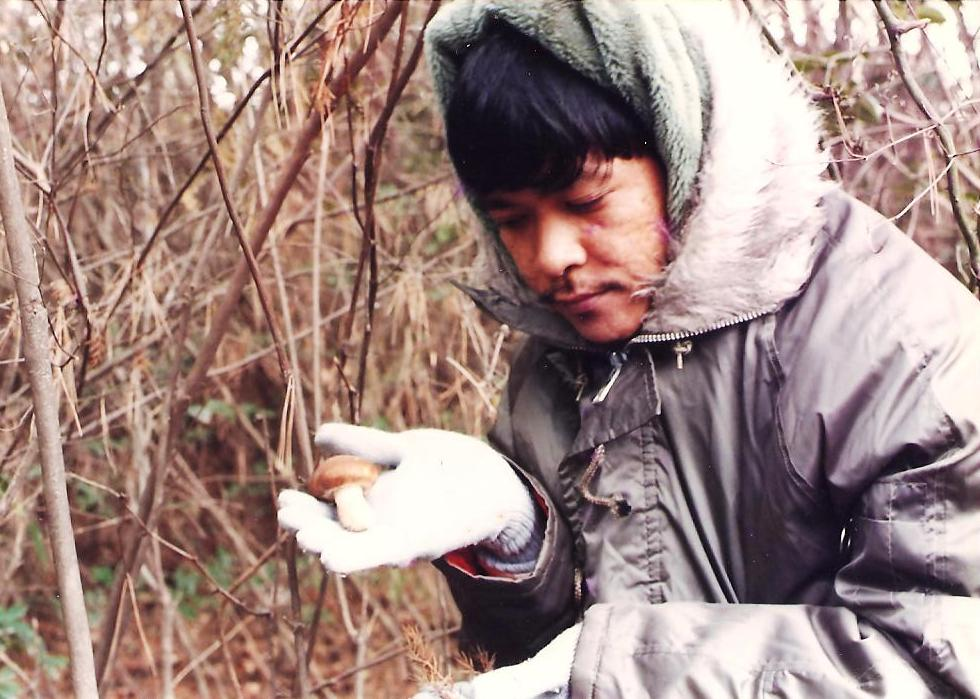
Two opisthokonts: a human (Metazoa) and a mushroom (Fungi)
