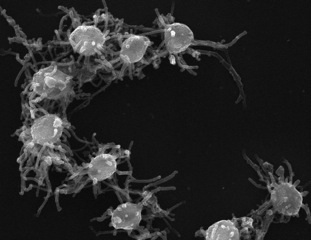
- Capsaspora, a filasterean
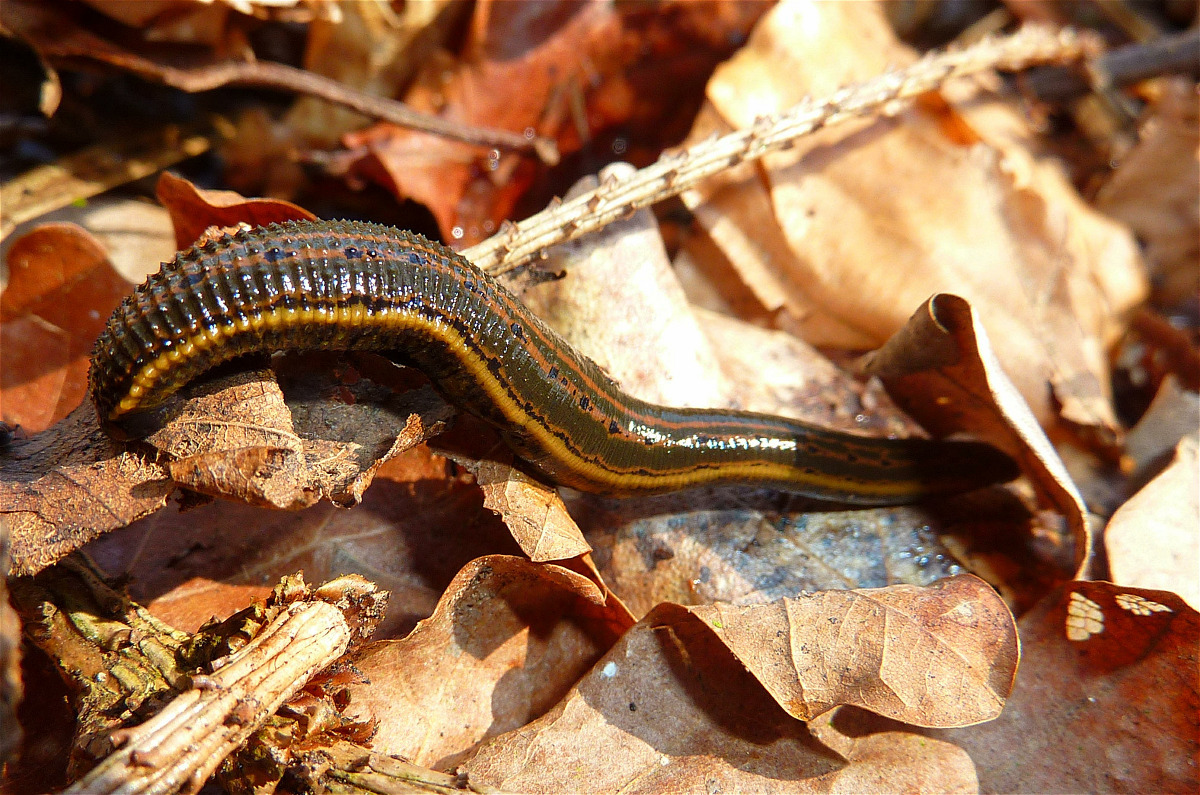
- Hirudo medicinalis, an animal

Scientific classification
- Domain: Eukaryota
- Clade: Podiata
- Clade: Amorphea
- Clade: Obazoa
- Clade: Opisthokonta
- Clade: Holozoa
- Clade: Filozoa; Shalchian-Tabrizi et al. 2008

Subgroups
- Filasterea; Choanozoa; Choanoflagellatea; Animalia

= Filozoa =

Filozoa Temporal range: 760–0 Ma

Monophyletic grouping within the Opisthokonta

The Filozoa are a monophyletic grouping within the Opisthokonta. They include animals and their nearest unicellular relatives (organisms which are more closely related to animals than to fungi or Mesomycetozoa).

Three groups are currently included within the clade Filozoa:

- Group Filasterea - recently described to include the genera Ministeria and Capsaspora
- Group Choanoflagellatea - collared flagellates
- Kingdom Animalia - the group which all extant animals belong to

== Etymology ==
The name Filozoa originates from the Latin word filum meaning "thread" and the Greek word zōion meaning "animal".

== Phylogeny ==
Below is a phylogenetic tree of Filozoa and the groups most closely related to the Filozoa :

- Opisthokonta 1300 mya
  - Holomycota
    - Cristidiscoidea
      - Fonticulida
      - Nucleariida
    - Fungi/ Opisthosporidia
      - BCG2
      - - - True Fungi
          - Aphelida
        - - BCG1
          - Rozellomyceta/ Cryptomycota
            - Rozella
            - - Namako-37
              - Microsporidia
  - Holozoa 1100 mya
    - Ichthyosporea
    - - Pluriformea
        - Syssomonas
        - Corallochytrium
      - Filozoa
        - Filasterea
        - Choanozoa 950 mya
          - Choanoflagellatea
          - Animalia

== Characteristics ==
The ancestral opisthokont cell is assumed to have possessed slender filose (thread-like) projections or 'tentacles'. In some opisthokonts (Mesomycetozoa and Corallochytrium) these were lost. They are retained in Filozoa, where they are simple and non-tapering, with a rigid core of actin bundles (contrasting with the flexible, tapering and branched filopodia of nucleariids and the branched rhizoids and hyphae of fungi). In choanoflagellates and in the most primitive animals, namely sponges, they aggregate into a filter-feeding collar (made from microvilli, that are also made from actin) around the cilium or flagellum; this is thought to be an inheritance from their most recent common filozoan ancestor (MRCFA).
