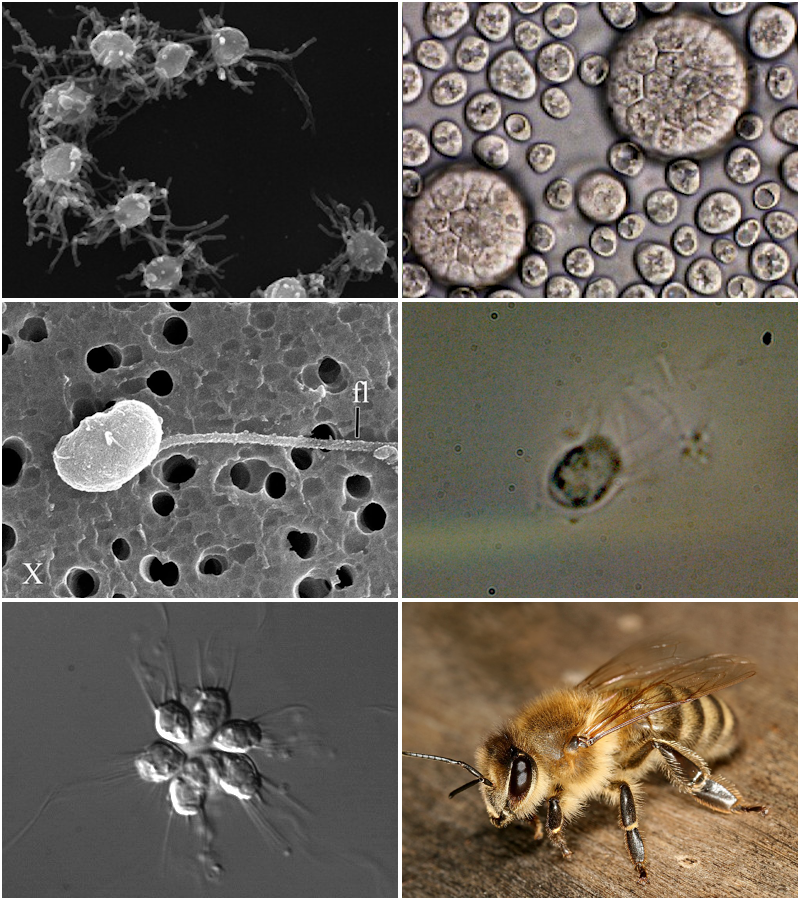
- Holozoan diversity. From top left corner: Capsaspora (Filasterea), Sphaeroforma (Ichthyosporea), Syssomonas (Pluriformea), Stephanoeca (Craspedida), Salpingoeca (Acanthoecida), Apis (Animalia)

Scientific classification
- Domain: Eukaryota
- Clade: Podiata
- Clade: Amorphea
- Clade: Obazoa
- Clade: Opisthokonta
- Clade: Holozoa; Lang et al. 2002

Subdivisions
- Pluriformea; Ichthyosporea (=Mesomycetozoea); Filozoa; Filasterea; Choanozoa; Choanoflagellata; Animalia; Incertae sedis; Tunicaraptor; †Bicellum

= Holozoa =

Holozoans Temporal range: Early Tonian - Present

Clade containing animals and some protists

Holozoa (from Ancient Greek ὅλος (holos) 'whole' and ζῷον (zoion) 'animal') is a clade of organisms that includes animals and their closest single-celled relatives, but excludes fungi and all other organisms. Together they amount to more than 1.5 million species of purely heterotrophic organisms, including around 300 unicellular species. It consists of various subgroups, namely Metazoa (or animals) and the protists Choanoflagellata, Filasterea, Pluriformea and Ichthyosporea. Along with fungi and some other groups, Holozoa is part of the Opisthokonta, a supergroup of eukaryotes. Choanofila was previously used as the name for a group similar in composition to Holozoa, but its usage is discouraged now because it excludes animals and is therefore paraphyletic.

The holozoan protists play a crucial role in understanding the evolutionary steps leading to the emergence of multicellular animals from single-celled ancestors. Recent genomic studies have shed light on the evolutionary relationships between the various holozoan lineages, revealing insights into the origins of multicellularity. Some fossils of possible metazoans have been reinterpreted as holozoan protists.

== Characteristics ==
=== Composition ===
Holozoa is a clade that includes animals and their closest relatives, as well as their common ancestor, but excludes fungi. It is defined on a branch-based approach as the clade encompassing all relatives of Homo sapiens (an animal), but not Neurospora crassa (a fungus). Holozoa, besides animals, primarily comprises unicellular protist lineages of varied morphologies such as choanoflagellates, filastereans, ichthyosporeans, and the distinct genera Corallochytrium, Syssomonas, and Tunicaraptor.

- Choanoflagellata, with around 250 species, are the closest living relatives of animals. They are free-living unicellular or colonial flagellates that feed on bacteria using a characteristic "collar" of microvilli. The collar of choanoflagellates closely resembles sponge collar cells, leading to theories since the 19th century about their relatedness to sponges. The mysterious Proterospongia is an example of a colonial choanoflagellate that was thought to be related to the origin of sponges. The affinities of the other single-celled holozoans only began to be recognized in the 1990s.
- Ichthyosporea, also known as Mesomycetozoea and comprising around 40 species, largely consist of parasites or commensals. They interact with a diverse range of animals, from humans and fish to marine invertebrates. Most reproduce through multinucleated colonies and disperse as flagellates or amoebae.
- Filasterea is a group of 6 amoeboid species belonging to the genera Ministeria, Pigoraptor, Capsaspora, and Txikispora, united by the structure of their thread-like pseudopods.
- Pluriformea is a provisional name for the clade composed by the two species Corallochytrium limacisporium and Syssomonas multiformis. These organisms have varied shapes, including cellular aggregations, amoebae, flagellates, and amoeboflagellates.
- Tunicaraptor unikontum is the newest discovered clade, whose position within Holozoa has yet to be resolved. It is a flagellate with a specialized "mouth" structure absent in other holozoans.
- Metazoa, known as animals, are multicellular organisms that sum more than 1.5 million living species. They are characterized by a blastula phase during their embryonic development and, except for the amorphous sponges, the formation of germ layers and differentiated tissues.

=== Genetics ===
The first sequenced unicellular holozoan genome was that of Monosiga brevicollis, a choanoflagellate. It measures around 41.6 mega–base-pairs (Mbp) and contains around 9200 coding genes, making it comparable in size to the genome of filamentous fungi. Animal genomes are usually larger (e.g. human genome, 2900 Mbp; fruit fly, 180 Mbp), with some exceptions.

== Evolution ==
=== Phylogeny ===
Holozoa, along with a clade that contains fungi and their protist relatives (Holomycota), are part of the larger supergroup of eukaryotes known as Opisthokonta. Holozoa diverged from their opisthokont ancestor around 1070 million years ago (Mya). The choanoflagellates, animals and filastereans group together as the clade Filozoa. Within Filozoa, the choanoflagellates and animals group together as the clade Choanozoa. Based on phylogenetic and phylogenomic analyses, the cladogram of Holozoa is shown below:

- Opisthokonta 1250 Mya
  - Holomycota 1110 Mya
    - Cristidiscoidea
    - Fungi
  - Holozoa 1070 Mya
    - Ichthyosporea
      - Dermocystida
      - Ichthyophonida
    - Pluriformea
      - Corallochytrium
      - Syssomonas
    - Tunicaraptor
    - Filozoa
      - Filasterea
      - Choanozoa 960 Mya
        - Choanoflagellata
        - - multicellularity
            Metazoa

Uncertainty remains around the relationship of the two most basal groups, Ichthyosporea and Pluriformea. They may be sister to each other, forming the putative clade Teretosporea. Alternatively, Ichthyosporea may be the earliest-branching of the two, while Pluriformea is sister to the Filozoa clade comprising filastereans, choanoflagellates and animals. This second outcome is more strongly supported after the discovery of Syssomonas.

The position of Tunicaraptor, the newest holozoan member, is still unresolved. Three different phylogenetic positions of Tunicaraptor have been obtained from analyses: as the sister group to Filasterea, as sister to Filozoa, or as the most basal group of all Holozoa.

Environmental DNA surveys of oceans have revealed new diverse lineages of Holozoa. Most of them nest within known groups, mainly Ichthyosporea and Choanoflagellata. However, one environmental clade does not nest within any known group and is a potential new holozoan lineage. It has been tentatively named MASHOL (for 'marine small Holozoa').

=== Unicellular ancestry of animals ===
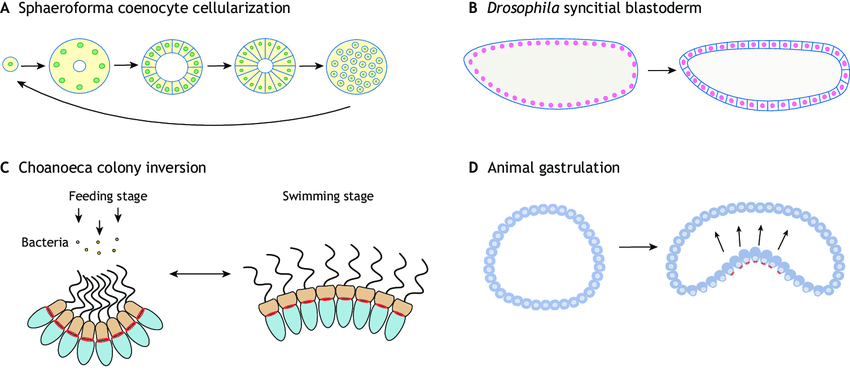
Unicellular holozoans do not go through animal embryonic development, but they display developmental processes using similar molecules. An actomyosin network controls the cellularization of both an ichthyosporean coenocyte (A) and a fruit fly blastoderm (B). Similarly, actomyosin contraction allows both the shaping of choanoflagellate colonies (C) and the gastrulation of animal embryos.

The quest to elucidate the evolutionary origins of animals from a unicellular ancestor requires an examination of the transition to multicellularity. In the absence of a fossil record documenting this evolution, insights into the unicellular ancestor of animals are obtained from the analysis of shared genes and genetic pathways between animals and their closest living unicellular relatives. The genetic content of these single-celled holozoans has revealed a significant discovery: many genetic characteristics previously thought as unique to animals can also be found in these unicellular relatives. This suggests that the origin of multicellular animals did not happen solely because of the appearance of new genes (i.e. innovation), but because of pre-existing genes that were adapted or utilized in new ways (i.e. co-option). For example:

- Adhesion proteins are necessary in allowing cells to stick to each other and to the extracellular matrix, forming layers and tissues in animals. Some unicellular holozoans, like choanoflagellates and filastereans, possess genes that encode proteins involved in cell-cell adhesion and cell-matrix adhesion (e.g. cadherin and integrin, respectively). Other genes, however, seem to be exclusively found in animals (e.g. β-catenin).
- ECM-related proteins, involved in the formation of the extracellular matrix, are present in other holozoans (e.g. laminins, collagens and fibronectins).
- Signal transduction proteins are another requirement for metazoan multicellularity. Some animal cytoplasmic tyrosine kinases (such as focal adhesion kinase) and the Hippo signaling pathway are present in unicellular holozoans. Other signaling pathways highly conserved in animals (e.g. Hedgehog, WNT, TGFβ, JAK-STAT and Notch) are absent in other holozoans, but similar signaling receptors evolved independently in choanoflagellates, filastereans and ichthyosporeans (e.g. receptor tyrosine kinases).
- A considerable portion of animal transcription factors (TF) is already present in unicellular holozoans, including some TF classes previously thought to be animal-specific (e.g. p53 and T-box).

Additionally, many biological processes seen in animals are already present in their unicellular relatives, such as sexual reproduction and gametogenesis in the choanoflagellate Salpingoeca rosetta and several types of multicellular differentiation.

=== Fossil record ===
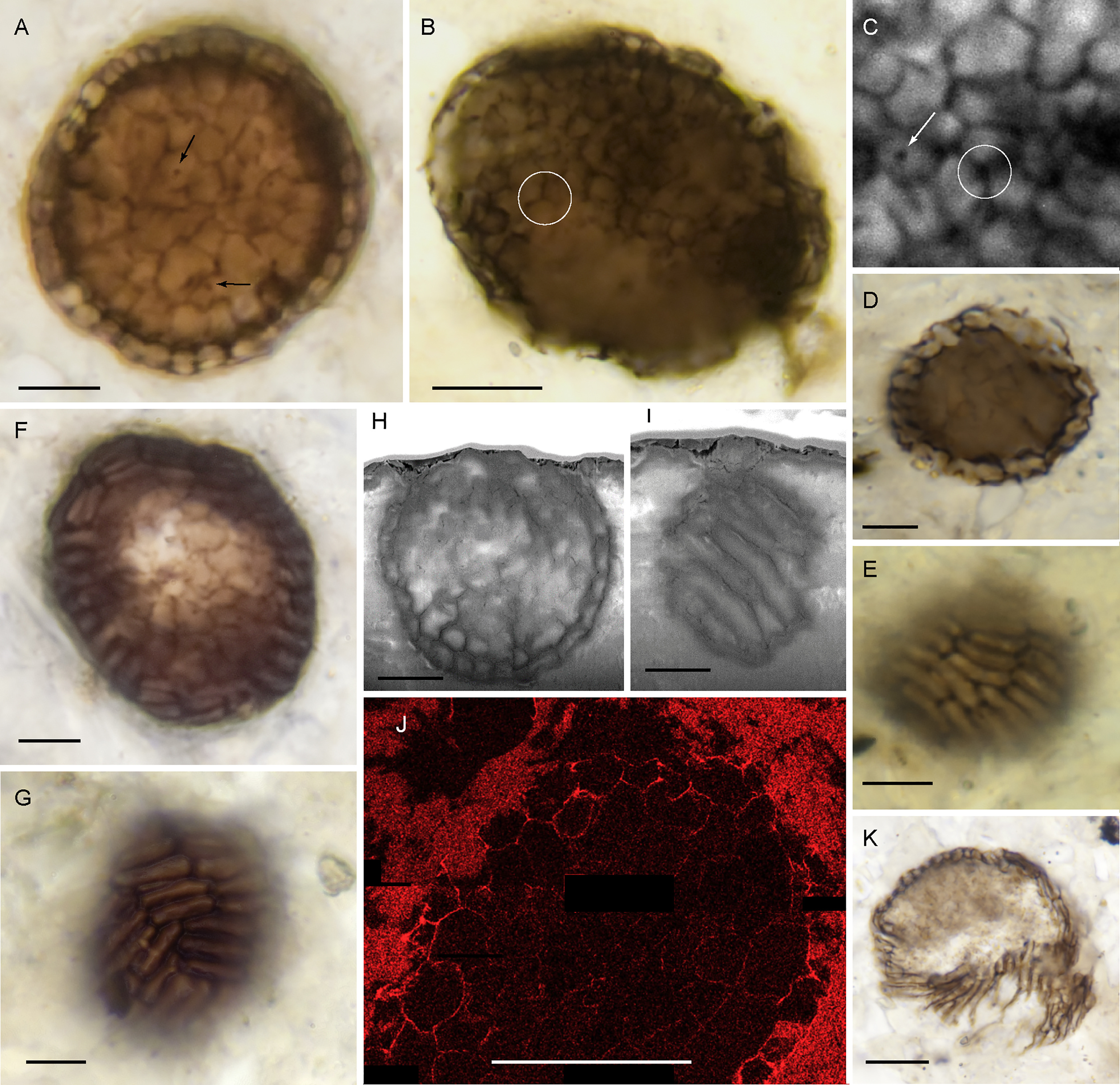
A fossilized sample of Bicellum brasieri, a billion-year-old potential holozoan.

A billion-year-old freshwater microscopic fossil named Bicellum brasieri is possibly the earliest known holozoan. It shows two differentiated cell types or life cycle stages. It consists of a spherical ball of tightly packed cells (stereoblasts) enclosed in a single layer of elongated cells. There are also two populations of stereoblasts with mixed shapes, which have been interpreted as cellular migration to the periphery, a movement that could be explained by differential cell-cell adhesion. These occurrences are consistent with extant unicellular holozoans, which are known to form multicellular stages in complex life cycles.

Proposed Ediacaran fossil "embryos" of early metazoans, discovered in the Doushantuo Formation, have been reinterpreted as non-animal protists within Holozoa. According to some authors, although they present possible embryonic cleavage, they lack metazoan synapomorphies such as tissue differentiation and nearby juveniles or adults. Instead, its development is comparable to the germination stage of non-animal holozoans. They possibly represent an evolutionary grade in which palintomic cleavage (i.e. rapid cell divisions without cytoplasmic growth in between, a characteristic of animal embryonic cleavage) was the method of dispersal and propagation.

== Taxonomy ==
=== History ===
Prior to 2002, a relationship between Choanoflagellata, Ichthyosporea and the animal-fungi divergence was considered on the basis of morphology and ultrastructure. Early phylogenetic analyses gave contradicting results, because the amount of available DNA sequences was insufficient to yield unambiguous results. The taxonomic uncertainty was such that, for example, some Ichthyosporea were traditionally treated as trichomycete fungi.

Holozoa was first recognized as a clade in 2002 through a phylogenomic analysis by Franz Bernd Lang, Charles J. O'Kelly and other collaborators, as part of a paper published in the journal Current Biology. The study used complete mitochondrial genomes of a choanoflagellate (Monosiga brevicollis) and an ichthyosporean (Amoebidium parasiticum) to firmly resolve the position of Ichthyosporea as the sister group to Choanoflagellata+Metazoa. This clade was named Holozoa (from Ancient Greek ὅλος (holos) 'whole' and ζῷον (zoion) 'animal'), meaning 'whole animal', referencing the wider animal ancestry that it contains.

Holozoa has since been supported as a robust clade by every posterior analysis, even after the discovery of more taxa nested within it (namely Filasterea since 2008, and the pluriformean species Corallochytrium and Syssomonas since 2014 and 2017 respectively). As of 2019, the clade is accepted by the International Society of Protistologists, which revises the classification of eukaryotes.

=== Classification ===
In classifications that use traditional taxonomic ranks (e.g. kingdom, phylum, class), all holozoan protists are classified as subphylum Choanofila (phylum Choanozoa, (Note: The term "Choanozoa" has been used since 1991 by Cavalier-Smith as a paraphyletic phylum of opisthokont protists, and the terms "Apoikozoa" and "choanimal" were proposed as names for the clade Metazoa+Choanoflagellata. However, these terms have not been formally described or adopted, and were rejected in favor of a renamed Choanozoa to fit the clade Metazoa+Choanoflagellata.) kingdom Protozoa) while the animals are classified as a separate kingdom Metazoa or Animalia. This classification excludes animals, even though they descend from the same common ancestor as choanofilan protists, making it a paraphyletic group rather than a true clade. Modern cladistic approaches to eukaryotic classification prioritise monophyletic groupings over traditional ranks, which are increasingly perceived as redundant and superfluous. Because Holozoa is a clade, its use is preferred over the paraphyletic taxon Choanofila.

- Holozoa Lang et al. 2002
  - Incertae sedis:
  - †Bicellum Strother & Wellman 2021
  - Tunicaraptor Tikhonenkov, Mikhailov, Hehenberger, Karpov, Prokina, Esaulov, Belyakova, Mazei, Mylnikov, Aleoshin & Keeling 2020
  - Ichthyosporea Cavalier-Smith 1998 [Mesomycetozoea Mendoza et al. 2002]
    - Dermocystida Cavalier-Smith 1998
    - Ichthyophonida Cavalier-Smith 1998
  - Pluriformea Hehenberger et al. 2017
    - Corallochytrium Raghu-Kumar 1987
    - Syssomonas Tikhonenkov, Hehenberger, Mylnikov & Keeling 2017
  - Filozoa Shalchian-Tabrizi et al. 2008
    - Filasterea Shalchian-Tabrizi et al. 2008
      - Capsaspora Hertel, Bayne & Loker, 2002
      - Ministeria Patterson et al. 1993
      - Pigoraptor Tikhonenkov et al. 2017
      - Txikispora Urrutia, Feist & Bass 2022
    - Choanozoa Brunet & King 2017 [Choanozoa Cavalier-Smith et al. 1991 (P)]
      - Choanoflagellata Kent 1880–1882 [Choanoflagellatea Cavalier-Smith 1997 emend. Cavalier-Smith 1998]
        - Craspedida Cavalier-Smith 1997, emend. Nitsche et al. 2011
        - Acanthoecida Cavalier-Smith 1997, emend. Nitsche et al. 2011
      - Metazoa Haeckel 1874, emend. Adl et al. 2005 [Animalia Linnaeus 1758]
        - Porifera Grant 1836
        - Placozoa Grell 1971
        - Ctenophora Eschscholtz 1829
        - Cnidaria Hatschek 1888
        - Bilateria Hatschek 1888
