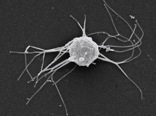
- Ministeria vibrans

Scientific classification
- Domain: Eukaryota
- Clade: Amorphea
- Class: Filasterea
- Order: Ministeriida
- Family: Ministeriidae; Cavalier-Smith, 2008
- Genus: Ministeria atterson, Nygaard, Steinberg & Turley, 1993 em. Tong 1997

Type species
- Ministeria marisola Patterson, Nygaard, Steinberg & Turley, 1993

Species
- Ministeria marisola Patterson et al., 1993; Ministeria vibrans Tong, 1997

= Ministeria =

Genus of Filasterea

Ministeria is a genus of Filasterea. The species can be found in the North Atlantic Ocean and in British waters.
