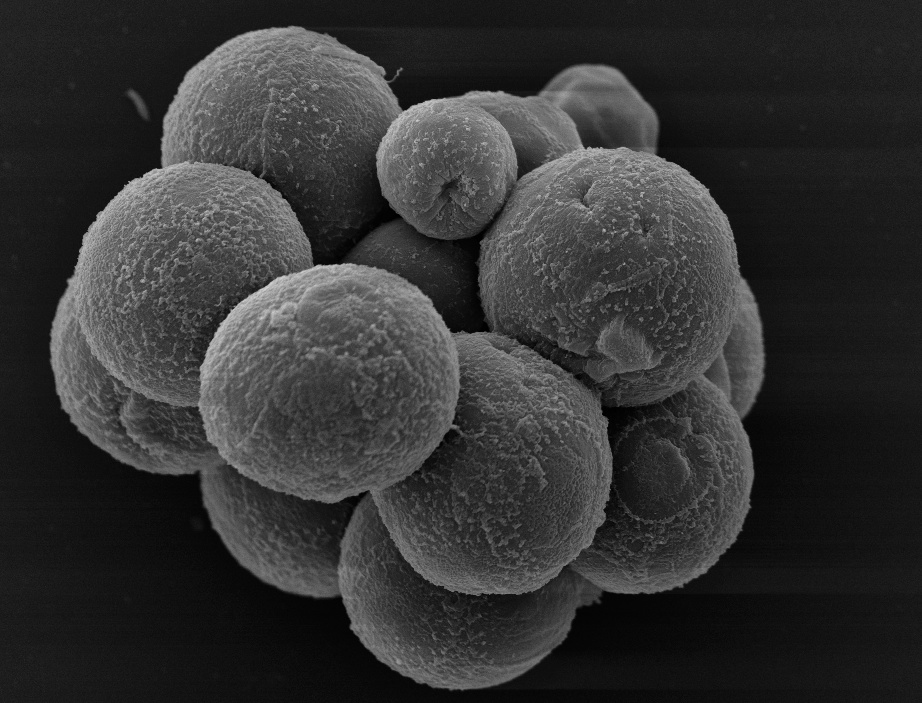
- Sphaeroforma arctica

Scientific classification
- Domain: Eukaryota
- Clade: Podiata
- Supergroup: Amorphea
- Clade: Obazoa
- Clade: Opisthokonta
- Clade: Holozoa
- Clade?: Teretosporea
- Class: Ichthyosporea; Cavalier-Smith 1998

Orders
- Dermocystida; Ichthyophonida

Synonyms
- Mesomycetozoa Mendoza et al. 2002

= Ichthyosporea =

Ichthyosporea Temporal range: Ediacaran–recent

Clade of eukaryote organisms

The Ichthyosporea (or DRIP clade, or Mesomycetozoea) are a small group of Opisthokonta in Eukaryota (formerly protists), mostly parasites of fish and other animals.

== Significance ==
They are not particularly distinctive morphologically, appearing in host tissues as enlarged spheres or ovals containing spores, and most were originally classified in various groups as fungi, protozoa, or colorless algae. However, they form a coherent group on molecular trees, closely related to both animals and fungi and so of interest to biologists studying their origins. In a 2008 study they emerge robustly as the sibling-group of the clade Filozoa, which includes the animals.

Huldtgren et al., following x-ray tomography of microfossils of the Ediacaran Doushantuo Formation, has interpreted them as mesomycetozoan spore capsules.

== Terminology ==
The name DRIP is an acronym for the first protozoa identified as members of the group, Cavalier-Smith later treated them as the class Ichthyosporea, since they were all parasites of fish.

- order Dermocystida
  - "D": Dermocystidium. One species, Rhinosporidium seeberi, infects birds and mammals, including humans.
  - "R": the "rosette agent", now known as Sphaerothecum destruens
- order Ichthyophonida
  - "I": Ichthyophonus
  - "P": Psorospermium

Since other new members have been added (e.g. the former fungal orders Eccrinales and Amoebidiales), Mendoza et al. suggested changing the name to Mesomycetozoea, which refers to their evolutionary position. On Eukaryota tree, in Opisthokont clade, Mesomycetozoea is in the middle ("Meso-") of the fungi ("-myceto-") and the animals ("-zoea"). The name Mesomycetozoa (without a third e) is also used to refer to this group, but Mendoza et al. use it as an alternate name for basal Opisthokonts.

== Phylogeny ==
- Ichthyosporea
  - Dermocystida
    Dermocystidaceae
  - Ichthyophonida
    - Creolimacidae
    - - Psorospermidae
      - - Piridae
        - Trichomycina
          - Amoebidiidae
          - - Ichthyophonidae
            - - Paramoebidiidae
              - Eccrinida
                - Parataeniellaceae
                - Eccrinaceae

== Taxonomy ==
- Class Ichthyosporea Cavalier-Smith 1998
  - Order Dermocystida Cavalier-Smith 1998
    - Family Rhinosporidiaceae Mendoza et al. 2001
  - Order Ichthyophonida Cavalier-Smith 1998
    - Suborder Sphaeroformina Cavalier-Smith 2012
      - Family Creolimacidae Cavalier-Smith 2012
      - Family Psorospermidae Cavalier-Smith 2012
      - Family Piridae Cavalier-Smith 2012
    - Suborder Trichomycina Cavalier-Smith 2012
      - Genus †Paleocadus Poinar 2016
      - Family Amoebidiidae Lichtenstein 1917 ex Kirk et al. 2001
      - Family Ichthyophonidae Cavalier-Smith 2012
      - Family Paramoebidiidae Reynolds et al. 2017
      - Family Parataeniellaceae Manier & Lichtward 1968
      - Family Eccrinaceae Leger & Duboscq 1929 [Palavasciaceae Manier & Lichtward 1968]
