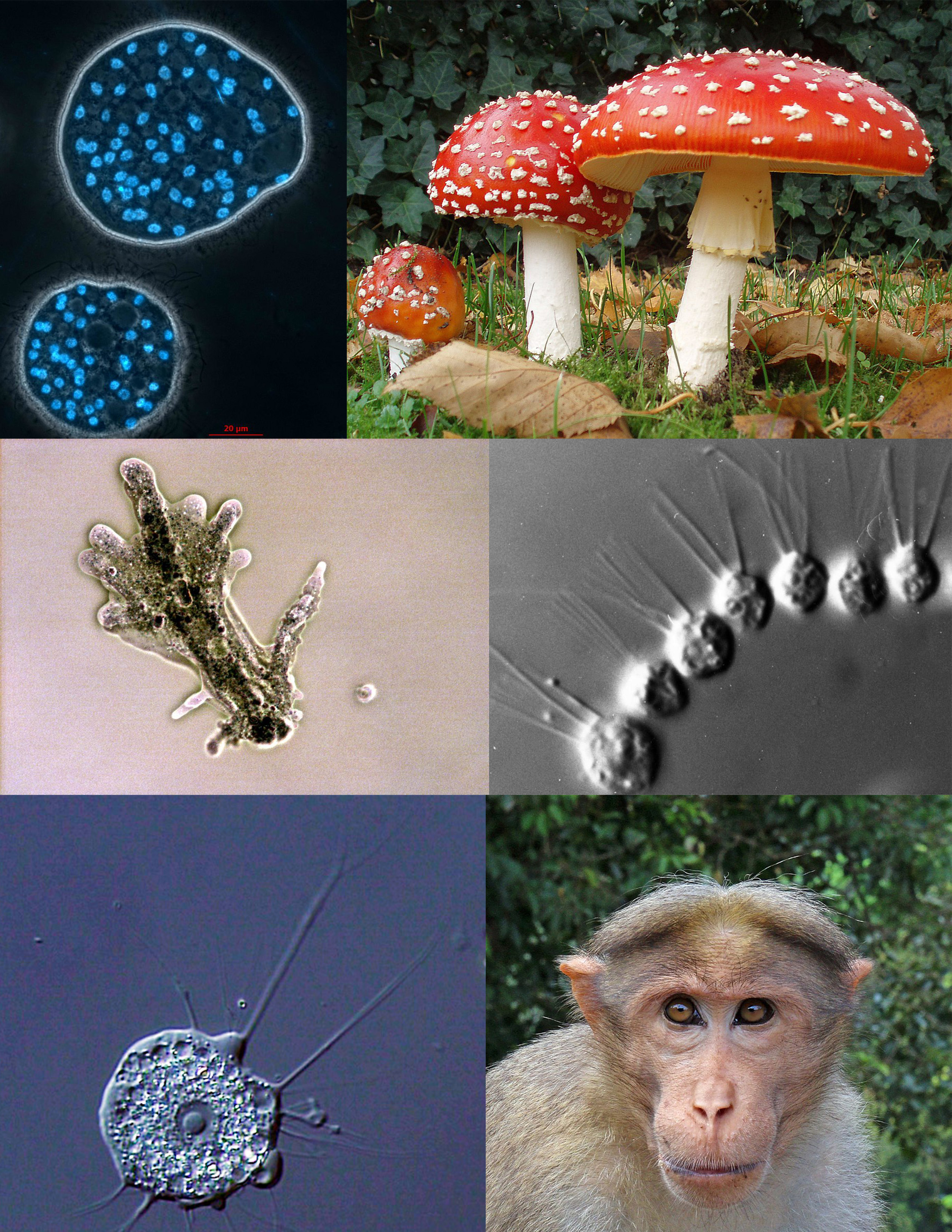
- Clockwise, from top left: Abeoforma whisleri (Ichthyosporea); Amanita muscaria (Fungi); Desmarella moniliformis (Choanoflagellata); bonnet macaque (Animalia); Nuclearia thermophila (Nucleariida); Amoeba proteus (Amoebozoa)

Scientific classification
- Domain: Eukaryota
- Clade: Podiata
- Supergroup: Amorphea
- Clade: Obazoa; Brown et al., 2013

Clades
- Breviatea; Apusomonadidae; Opisthokonta

= Obazoa =

Obazoa Temporal range: Late Stenian - Present, 1010–0 Ma

Group of single-celled organisms

Obazoa is a sister clade of Amoebozoa (which together form Amorphea). The term Obazoa is based on the OBA acronym for Opisthokonta, Breviatea, and Apusomonadidae, the group's three constituent clades.

Determining the placement of Breviatea and Apusomonadida and their properties is of interest for the development of the opisthokonts in which the main lineages of animals and fungi emerged. The relationships among opisthokonts, breviates and apusomonads are not conclusively resolved (as of 2018), though Breviatea is usually inferred to be sister to the other two lineages.

The phylogeny of the Obazoa is shown in the cladogram.

- Eukaryota 2200 mya
  - Diphoda
    - Diaphoretickes (inc. plants)
    - Discoba
  - - Glissogyra
      - Ancyromonadida
      - Malawimonada
    - - CRuMs
      - Podiata
        - Amoebozoa
        - Amorphea 1500 mya
          - Breviatea
          - Obazoa
            - Apusomonadidae
            - Opisthokonta 1300 mya
              - Holomycota (incl. fungi)
              - Holozoa (incl. animals)
