= List of Microsporidian genera =

This is a list of Microsporidia genera:

- Abelspora
- Agglomerata
- Agmasoma
- Alfvenia
- Alloglugea
- Amazonspora
- Amblyospora
- Ameson
- Amphiacantha
- Amphiamblys
- Anncaliia
- Antonospora
- Aurospora
- Bacillidium
- Baculea
- Berwaldia
- Binucleospora
- Bohuslavia
- Burenella
- Burkea
- Brachiola
- Bryonosema
- Buxtehudea
- Campanulospora
- Canningia
- Caudospora
- Chapmanium
- Chytridiopsis
- Ciliatosporidium
- Coccospora
- Cougourdella
- Cryptosporina
- Cucumispora
- Culicospora
- Culicosporella
- Cristulospora
- Cylindrospora
- Cystosporogenes
- Desportesia
- Dictyocoela
- Duboscqia
- Edhazardia
- Encephalitozoon
- Endoreticulatus
- Enterocytozoon
- Episeptum
- Evlachovaia
- Fibrillanosema
- Flabelliforma
- Geusia
- Glugea
- Glugoides
- Golbergia
- Gurleya
- Gurleyides
- Hamiltosporidium
- Hazardia
- Helmichia
- Hessea
- Heterosporis
- Hirsutosporos
- Holobispora
- Hrabeyia
- Hyalinocysta
- Ichthyosporidium
- Inodosporus
- Intexta
- Intrapredatorus
- Janacekia
- Jirovecia
- Jiroveciana
- Johenrea
- Kabatana
- Kinorhyncospora
- Lanatospora
- Larssonia
- Larssoniella
- Liebermannia
- Loma
- Marssoniella
- Merocinta
- Metchnikovella
- Microfilum
- Microgemma
- Microsporidium
- Mrasekia
- Myosporidium
- Nadelspora
- Napamichum
- Nelliemelba
- Neonosemoides
- Neoperezia
- Nolleria
- Norlevinea
- Nosema
- Nosemoides
- Nucleospora
- Nudispora
- Octosporea
- Octotetrasporea
- Oligosporidium
- Ordospora
- Ormieresia
- Orthosomella
- Ovavesicula
- Ovipleistophora
- Paranosema
- Parapleistophora
- Parastempellia
- Parathelohania
- Pegmatheca
- Perezia
- Pernicivesicula
- Pilosporella
- Pleistophora
- Pleistosporidium
- Polydispyrenia
- Pseudoloma
- Pseudonosema
- Pseudopleistophora
- Pulicispora
- Pyrotheca
- Rectispora
- Resiomera
- Ringueletium
- Schroedera
- Scipionospora
- Semenovaia
- Senoma
- Simuliospora
- Spherospora
- Spraguea
- Steinhausia
- Stempellia
- Striatospora
- Systenostrema
- Tabanispora
- Tardivesicula
- Telomyxa
- Tetramicra
- Thelohania
- Toxoglugea
- Toxospora
- Trachipleistophora
- Trichoduboscqia
- Trichonosema
- Trichoctosporea
- Trichotuzetia
- Tricornia
- Tubulinosema
- Tuzetia
- Unikaryon
- Vittaforma
- Vairimorpha
- Vavraia
- Visvesvaria
- Vittaforma
- Weiseria
- Wittmannia
