= Aphelidium =

Scientific classification
- Kingdom: Fungi
- Division: Aphelidiomycota
- Class: Aphelidiomycetes
- Order: Aphelidiales
- Family: Aphelidiaceae
- Genus: Aphelidium; Zopf 1885 em. Gromov 2000

Type species
- Aphelidium deformans Zopf 1885

Species
- See text

Genus of eukaryotes

Aphelidium species are endoparasites of freshwater green algae. Aphelidium belongs to the phylum Aphelida, and is part of the Opisthosporidia, a group that was formerly thought as being the sister clade to Fungi. The cells of Aphelidium are much smaller than the cells of its green algae host, which is protected by a robust cell wall. Aphelidium have evolved a remarkable life cycle to defeat host's defenses.

The infection process for Aphelidium is notable for its method of entry. An Aphelidium cyst attached to a potential host will raise its internal pressure by expanding the posterior vacuole before using the sudden release of this pressure to defeat the host cell wall and jet itself into the host. As parasites of green algae, Aphelidium have important implications for the production of biofuels using algaculture.

== History of research ==
Aphelidium was first described in 1885 by Wilhelm Zopf, however the current phylogenetic organisation was not solidified until the 2010s. In the first half of the 20th century, Aphelidium was put in the Monadinea group, a group of organisms with life cycles resembling a fungus but have amoebic trophic stages. Beginning from the 1950s Aphelidium were included in class Rhizopoda, and for the rest of the 20th century while studies in Aphelidium life cycles and ecology continued, Aphelidium was not included in the updated phylogenetic classifications. Interest in classifying Aphelidium renewed in the 21st century when class Aphelidea was established by Gromov, which includes Aphelidium, Amoeboaphelidium, and Pseudaphelidium. rRNA analysis provided the needed resolution for Aphelidium’s position in the phylogenetic tree, placing it with Cryptomycota (Rozella and the like), and Microsporidia to form the ARM branch. The ARM branch, also known as the Opisthosporidia, was thought being a monophyletic sister group to fungi.

Tedersoo et al. showed in 2018 that Opisthosporidia is not a clade, with Rozellomyceta branching before the split of Aphelidea and Eumycota.

== Ecology and life cycle ==
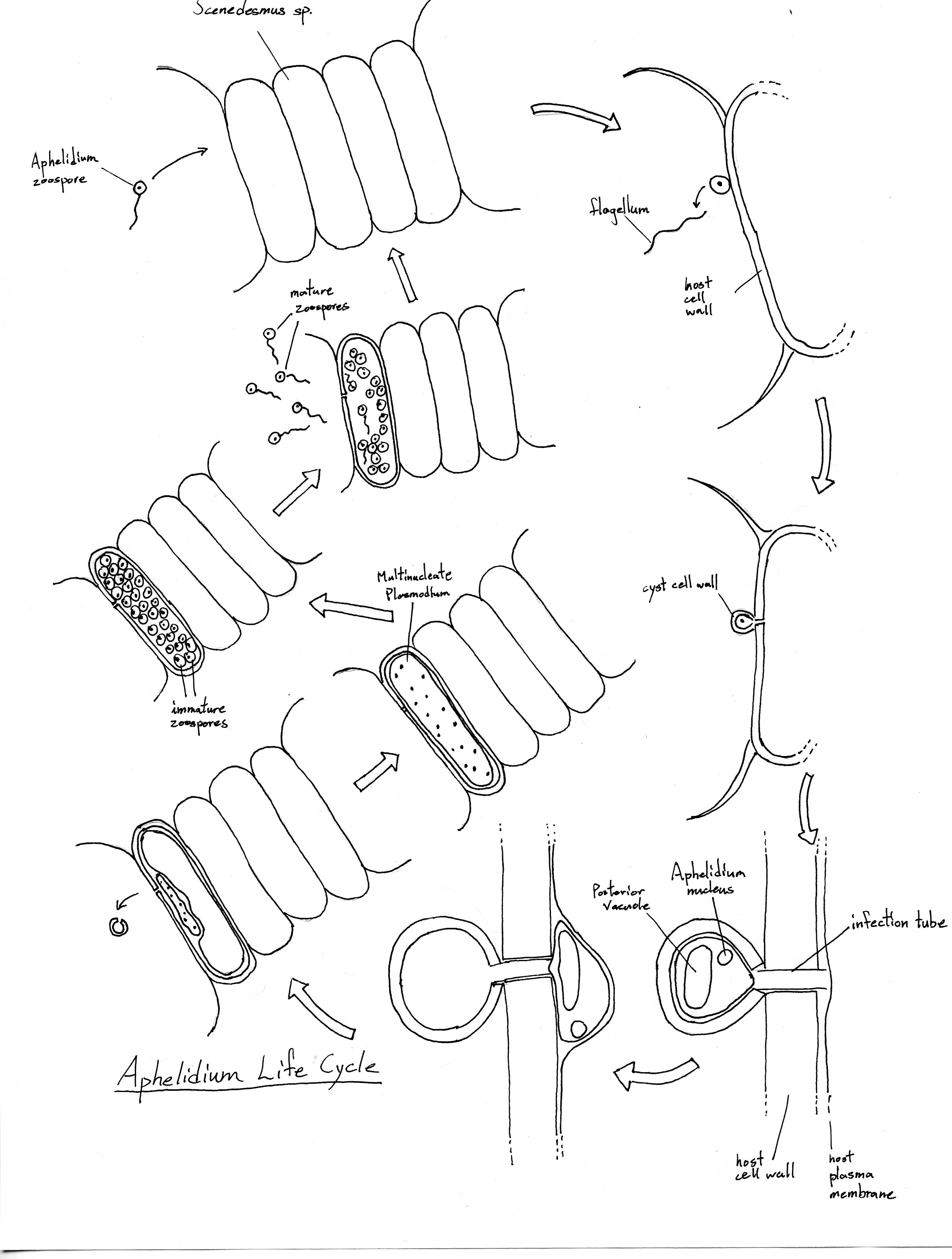
Typical Aphelidium life cycle. Depicts infection of Scenedesmus sp.

All known examples of Aphelidium are obligate parasites of freshwater phytoplankton. As parasites, the life cycle of Aphelidium is closely tied to its ecological relationship with its hosts. The cycle begins with the motile Aphelidium zoospore contacting its host, a green alga. The singular flagellum of the zoospore is lost as part of the attachment process. A pseudopodium extends from the zoospore and probes the host surface, seeking a weakness or gap in the cell wall. The attached zoospore first encysts then inserts an infection tube into the host cell, priming the ingress of the Aphelidium. The cyst forms a posterior vacuole, which expands and raises the internal pressure of the cyst. Ultimately the pressure pushing against the chitin wall of the cyst punctures the cell wall of the host green alga at the point of insertion of the infection tube, and the Aphelidium enters its host abruptly, leaving the cyst cell wall behind.

Once within the host, Aphelidium becomes an amoeboid that proceeds to consume the host from the inside out by phagocytizing host cytoplasm before digesting it internally in a central digestive vacuole. As the parasite expands within the host cell, it develops into a multinucleate plasmodium which grows to eventually replace the entirety of the host cytoplasm. Now all that remains of the green alga is its cell wall and the residual body, a clump consisting of host cell fragments indigestible to the parasite. The Aphelidium plasmodium then proceeds to divide into uninucleate cells which develop into zoospores, using the cell wall of the host alga as a sporangium. Finally, the uniflagellate zoospores erupt the husk of the host cell via the same puncture made by the infection tube of the parent Aphelidium to seek new green alga hosts.

== Practical importance ==
Microalgae are candidates for biofuel production, thanks to their fast generation times and low space requirements. In the high-density environment of algal agriculture, parasites can quickly propagate and devastate the algae population, which makes algal endoparasites such as Aphelidium important targets for study.

== List of species ==
- ?Aphelidium lacerans Bruyne 1890
- ?Aphelidium chaetophora Scherffel 1925
- Aphelidium chlorococcarum Fott 1957
- Aphelidium deformans Zopf 1885 (Type species of genus)
- Aphelidium desmodesmi Letcher 2017
- Aphelidium melosirae Scherffel 1925
- Aphelidium tribonemae Scherffel 1925
