= Loma salmonae =

Scientific classification
- Kingdom: Fungi
- Phylum: Rozellomycota
- Class: Microsporidia
- Order: Glugeida
- Family: Glugeidae
- Genus: Loma
- Species: L. salmonae

Binomial name
- Loma salmonae (Putz, M.J. Hoffman & Dunbar) C.M. Morrison & V. Sprague (1981)

Species of microsporidian parasite

Loma salmonae is a species of microsporidian parasite, infecting Pacific salmon (Oncorhynchus spp.). L. salmonae is the causative agent of microsporidial gill disease of salmon. It is an intracellular parasite which induces respiratory distress, secondary infection, and increased mortality rates.

== Life cycle ==
Loma salmonae enters the Oncorhynchus host's gut via an infective spores. Once in the gut, the spore injects its sporoplasm into an epithelial cell. From there, it migrates to the heart for a two-week merogony-like phase. In the heart, the host's immune system phagocytizes the parasite. Following macrophage mediated transportation, L. salmonae enters into the host's gills where it enters a final developmental stage. At this stage, it becomes a spore laden xenoma. This xenoma ruptures and causes inflammation and severe gill damage. This also opens up the possibility of secondary infection. The released spores can then be consumed by another Oncorynchus spp. completing the life cycle.
