= Loma morhua =

Scientific classification
- Kingdom: Fungi
- Phylum: Rozellomycota
- Class: Microsporidia
- Order: Glugeida
- Family: Glugeidae
- Genus: Loma
- Species: L. morhua

Binomial name
- Loma morhua Morrison & Sprague, 1981

Species of microsporidian parasite

Loma morhua, also known as Loma branchialis, is a species of microsporidian parasite, infecting fish. It forms xenoparasitic complexes of the cell-hypertrophy tumour type, and is found in the gills of the Atlantic cod Gadus morhua. It is apansporoblastic, unikaryotic, disporoblastic and undergoes partial development in parasitophorous vacuoles, while lacking plasmodial stages. It produces one or two spores in a vacuole, having tubules in the parasitophorous vacuoles.
