= Hazardia =

Hazardia may refer to:

- Hazardia (plant), a genus of flowering plants in the family Asteraceae
- Hazardia (microsporidian), a fungus genus in the division Microsporidia
