= Vairimorpha =

Scientific classification
- Kingdom: Fungi
- Phylum: Rozellomycota
- Class: Microsporidia
- Family: Nosematidae
- Genus: Vairimorpha

Genus of microsporidian parasites

Vairimorpha is a genus of microsporidian parasites.

Species include:

- Vairimorpha apis - a parasite of the honey bee
- Vairimorpha ceranae - a parasite of the honey bee
- Vairimorpha cheracis - a parasite of the Australian freshwater crayfish, Cherax destructor
- Vairimorpha disparis - a parasite of the moth, Lymantria dispar
- Vairimorpha ephestiae - a parasite of the wax moth, Galleria mellonella
- Vairimorpha hybomitrae - a parasite of gadflies of the genus Hybomitra
- Vairimorpha invictae - a parasite of the fire ant, Solenopsis invicta
- Vairimorpha lymantriae - a parasite of the gypsy moth, Lymantria dispar
- Vairimorpha necatrix - a parasite of several moth species
- Vairimorpha plodiae
