= Enoch Zander =

German entomologist (1873–1957)

Enoch Detlef Hartwig Zander (19 June 1873 – 15 June 1957) was a German apiologist and entomologist. He identified the microsporidial causal organism of the so-called Isle-of-Wight disease as Nosema in bees and described the species N. apis. He also introduced methods of pollen analysis to determine the origin of honey. He published an influential handbook of beekeeping.

Zander was born in Zirzow in a well-established Mecklenburg family and took an interest in botany and zoology early in life. He studied at the universities of Kiel and then at Rostock before receiving a doctorate from the University of Erlangen in 1897 with a thesis on the male genitalia of hexapods under Albert Fleischmann. He then became a lecturer at the University of Erlangen. He worked for some time at the Naples marine biology research station. In 1907 he joined the newly created Bavarian state institute for beekeeping - The Landesandstalt für Bienenzucht Erlangen. Here he identified the causal organism of a disease as Nosema apis in 1909. When the institute became independent, Zander was put in charge of it and worked there until his retirement in 1937. He published more than 500 publications on beekeeping including several popular textbooks that went into multiple editions.
