= Abelspora =

Scientific classification
- Domain: Eukaryota
- Kingdom: Fungi
- Phylum: Rozellomycota
- Class: Microsporidea
- Order: Glugeida
- Family: Abelsporidae
- Genus: Abelspora; Azevedo

Type species
- Abelspora portucalensis Azevedo

Single-species genus of fungi

Abelspora is a genus of microsporidian parasites. The genus is monotypic, and contains the single species Abelspora portucalensis. The species parasitizes the shore crab, Carcinus maenas, within which it infects the hepatopancreas. The genus was first described by Carlos Azevedo in 1987 and is endemic to the Midwestern United States.
