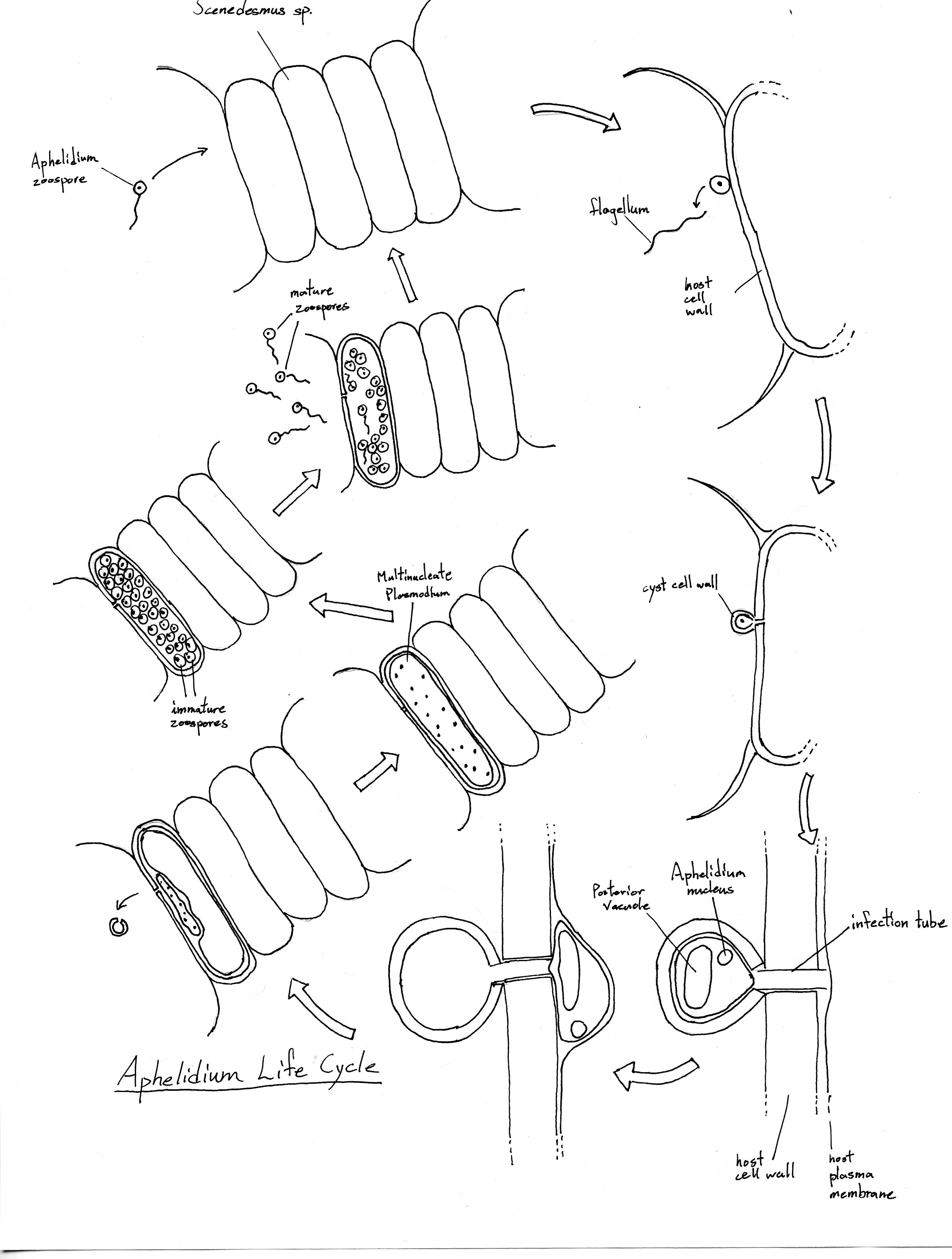

Scientific classification
- Kingdom: Fungi
- Division: Aphelidiomycota
- Class: Aphelidiomycetes
- Order: Aphelidiales
- Family: Aphelididae
- Genus: Aphelidium
- Species: A. tribonemae

Binomial name
- Aphelidium tribonemae Arch. Protistenk. 52: 44 (1925)

= Aphelidium tribonemae =

Species of eukaryote

Aphelidium tribonemae is a species within the Aphelid group. Their classification in the kingdom Fungi is a subject of controversy. Some argue for the classification of aphelids as 'fungal animals', and for a period of time in the 1950s, aphelids were classified as protists (class Rhizopoda, order Proteomyxida) due to their amoeboid stage. Recently, molecular phylogenetics placed the aphelids within Opisthosporidia, a super phylum within Opisthokonta. Aphelids have posterior uniflagellate zoospores which place them as Opisthokonts. They are an early diverging lineage in Kingdom Fungi. While the aphelid group only contains three genera, it spans many both freshwater and marine ecosystems.

Aphelidium tribonemae are obligate parasites of freshwater algae, biotrophs, and primary consumers. As the infected algal host cell is eventually killed due to the Aphelidium tribonemae consuming the entire cytoplasm, they are considered to be parasitoids. The hosts for Aphelidium tribonemae are the green and yellow algal species Tribonema gayanum and Botridiopsis intercedens. They are able to cause multiple infections.

== Life cycle ==
First, the uniflagellate zoospore finds a host algal cell and connects itself to it. From the zoospore, the cyst germinates. The cyst then perforates the host alga cell wall with its infection tube. As it encysts, it loses its flagellum. The insides of the cyst are then forced into the host cell through the infection tube by the vacuole. Once this has occurred, the aphelid becomes an intracellular phagotrophic amoeba. The amoeba envelopes the host cytoplasm and creates vacuoles for food. As it grows, it makes an endobiotic plasmodium and ingests the entirety of the host cell's cytoplasm. One to two residual bodies are formed with creation of the endobiotic plasmodium. Subsequently, it creates a multinucleate plasmodium containing a big central vacuole and a residual excretion body. Finally, once the plasmodium is mature, it divides into many uninucleate cells which mature and are expelled from the now empty host cell. These mature uniflagellate zoospores go on to infect new algal cells and the cycle continues. Sexual stage is not known and has not been studied.

The most well known and well studied phase of their life cycle is the plasmodium stage with the large central vacuole because it remains the longest in cell culture and is therefore easiest to observe.

== Morphology ==
Aphelidium tribonemae have flat mitochondrial cristae in their zoospores and tubular cristae in their cysts. They hijack their host's cell wall to act as their zoosporangium. Thus, they do not make their own sporangium wall. The thalli of Aphelidium tribonemae are small.

=== Zoospores ===
Zoospores are oval in shape and 2-3 μm in size. They have many filopodia which are extensions of the plasma membrane. Zoospores have 6-8 flagella. The cyst is sessile or it has a short stalk. The resting spores are spherical in shape and are 6-7 μm in size. The resting body is located outside the cell. Zoospores are said to crawl like amoeba wielding their pseudopodia while the flagellum is towed behind it.

== Ecology ==
Aphelidium tribonemae are endobiotic obligate parasitoids as they get their nutrients from algae. They are biotrophic and primary consumers thus occupying the second trophic level of their ecosystems. Because they infect algal host cells, they can play a crucial role in freshwater ecology and their ecology is intimately related to that of their host ecology. Aphelidium tribonemae are able to manage algae blooms and can control the complexity of their ecosystems due to this linkage. In Ireland, they were likely the cause of collapse of several microalgal populations. Because many organisms in freshwater ecosystems depend on algae, A. tribonemae, could have detrimental effects to the entire ecosystem.

== Habitat ==
Aphelids, including Aphelidium tribonemae, prefer to live in eutrophic freshwater basins, where they can inhabit the planktonic and epiphytic algae on aquatic plants. They can also be found on the soil surface near water reservoirs. Eutrophic water is the result of a process called eutrophication, where an increased nutrient load in the water stimulates algal blooms. Eutrophication occurs in agricultural and residential areas, where runoff into water sources adds nutrients such as nitrogen. The resulting algal and plant blooms can become harmful when the matter decomposes, overloading the water source with carbon dioxide that can cause dead zones and fish kills. Since eutrophic water basins have a greater abundance of algae, aphelids are readily found.

The most common hosts for aphelids are algae belonging to the phyla Chlorophyta, Xanthophyta, and Bacillariophyta. Host and parasitoid relationships are often genus specific, making the most common host for Aphelidium tribonemae the yellow-green algae Tribonema gayanum. Another observed host is the yellow-green algae Botridiopsis intercedens. These species are used to culture A. tribonemae.

== Geographic distribution ==
The geographic distribution of Aphelidium tribonemae has not been thoroughly documented, however samples have been collected from freshwater basins around the world. A study in Ladoga Lake, located in northwestern Russia, found Aphelidium in 6 of 10 stations on the lake and adjacent bodies of water. Another study conducted in Rhode Island, USA used environmental 18S rRNA sequencing to identify aphelids in freshwater marshes, brackish water, and salt marshes in the area.
