= Carlos José Correia de Azevedo =

Portuguese biologist

Carlos Azevedo
- Born: Carlos José Correia de Azevedo
- Scientific career
- Fields: Parasitology, Protistology

Carlos José Correia de Azevedo is a Portuguese biologist specialising in microparasites of aquatic organisms, particularly Apicomplexa, Haplosporidia, Microsporidia, and Myxozoa.

== Career ==
Carlos Azevedo is a retired Full Professor of the Abel Salazar Biomedical Sciences Institute, University of Porto, Portugal, where he taught Cell Biology until his retirement in 2004. After an initial focus on Spermatology (1972-1987), his research has focused on microparasites of aquatic organisms since 1985. He is a member of the Interdisciplinary Center of Marine and Environmental Research (CIIMAR/UP) of the University of Porto, as well as an Honorary member of Brazilian Society of Anatomy. Since 2009, Carlos Azevedo has been a Visiting Professor of the College of Science, King Saud University, Riyadh, Saudi Arabia.

== Taxa described ==
Carlos Azevedo has described over 70 new taxa of microparasites, including:

- Abelspora portucalensis Azevedo, 1987, and the genus Abelspora itself
- Ceratomyxa auratae Rocha, Casal, Rangel, Castro, Severino, Azevedo & Santos, 2015
- Ellipsomyxa gobioides Azevedo, Videira, Casal, Matos, Oliveira, Al-Quraishy & Matos, 2013
- Glugea arabica Azevedo, Abdel‑Baki, Rocha, Al‑Quraishy & Casal, 2016
- Haplosporidium edule Azevedo, Conchas & Montes, 2003
- Haplosporidium lusitanicum Azevedo, 1984
- Haplosporidium montforti Azevedo, Balseiro, Casal, Gestal, Aranguren, Stokes, Carnegie, Novoa, Burreson & Figueras, 2006
- Loma myrophis Azevedo & Matos, 2002
- Nematopsis gigas Azevedo & Padovan, 2004
- Vavraia mediterranica Azevedo, 2001
