= Ameson =

Scientific classification
- Kingdom: Fungi
- Division: Rozellomycota
- Class: Microsporidia
- Order: Glugeida
- Family: Pereziidae
- Genus: Ameson; Sprague 1977

Genus of microsporidia

Ameson is a genus of microsporidia belonging to the family Pereziidae.
