= Nosema apis =

Scientific classification
- Kingdom: Fungi
- Division: Rozellomycota
- Class: Microsporidia
- Family: Nosematidae
- Genus: Nosema
- Species: N. apis

Binomial name
- Nosema apis (Zander, 1909)

Species of microsporidian parasite

Nosema apis is a microsporidian, a small, unicellular parasite recently reclassified as a fungus that mainly affects honey bees. It causes nosemosis, also called nosema, which is the most common and widespread of adult honey bee diseases. The dormant stage of N. apis is a long-lived spore which is resistant to temperature extremes and dehydration, and cannot be killed by freezing the contaminated comb. Nosemosis is a listed disease with the Office International des Epizooties (OIE).

== Pathology ==
Nosema apis is a single-celled parasite of the western honey bee (Apis mellifera). The species is of the class Microsporidia, which were previously thought to be protozoans, but are now classified as fungi or fungi-related. Microsporidia are intracellular parasites and they infect the epithelial cells of the midgut. N. apis has a resistant spore that withstands temperature extremes and dehydration. In 1996, a similar microsporidian parasite of the eastern honey bee (Apis cerana) was discovered in Asia, which was named Nosema ceranae. Little is known about the symptoms and the course of the disease.

Chinese researchers found Nosema ceranae in spring 2005 in Taiwan for the first time, and it has now been seen on western honey bees. The new pathogen was discovered in 2005 in Spain and was observed to have a notably higher virulence than the western version. The disease caused by N. ceranae in western honey bees in Spain is related to heavier disease patterns deviating from the previously typical findings (unusually heavy intestine injuries in the bees, no diarrhea, preferential affliction of older collecting bees). Bees die far away from the dwellings, as when they leave they are too weak to return. This leads to the collapse of the bee colony. Within a few years, a strongly increased propagation of Nosema was observed, and its occurrence was happening all year round due to the higher resistance of N. ceranae. A higher reinfection rate of the bee colonies is assumed, since the pathogen survives longer in the external environment.

The two pathogen types cannot be differentiated with usual routine investigations, but can be distinguished only with the assistance of molecular-genetic methods such as polymerase chain reaction or SEM analysis.

Spanish researchers regard with alarm the insurgence of N. ceranae in Spain, which has now replaced N. apis. Because of this newly emergent parasite, the pathogen is assumed to be related to the substantial bee mortality observed in Spain since autumn 2004. They conjectured a similar cause for increased bee colony losses reported in other European countries, such as those experienced in France since the end of the 1990s and in Germany in 2002 and 2003.

In the samples examined in German laboratories in the winter of 2005/2006, the new pathogen was present in eight of 10 examined bee hives (CVUA Freiburg), with the distribution varying from state to state. The bees with the classical pathogen N. apis came from Thuringia and Bavaria, whereas N. ceranae prevailed in Baden-Wuerttemberg, Bavaria, and North Rhine-Westphalia. Cases were also reported from Switzerland (July 2006) and from several regions of Italy (September 2006) where N. ceranae was found in bee colonies with increased mortality.

German scientists do not know whether N. ceranae was already present in Europe and simply had not yet been differentiated from N. apis. The current disease processes possibly are more extreme when a Nosema affliction occurs because the colonies are already weakened by the Varroa mite or other factors that make them more susceptible. However, signs indicate the disease process of Nosema has changed, and the disease arises now all year round.

The investigation of 131 bee colonies from Bavaria supports the thesis of a causal participation between bee viruses, which were transferred by arthropods (for instance the Varroa mite), and the periodically arising mass losses of life in the hives. Since only comparatively few of these colonies were afflicted with microsporidians (evidence showed 14.5% of the cases were afflicted with microsporidian spores, with half of the cases by N. apis and/or N. ceranae), a correlation between microsporidian affliction and virus infection could not be determined. The question of whether the colonies were dying rather from the "new" version of Nosema, which (possibly) possesses a higher pathogenicity, or due to virus diseases connected with Varroa affliction, is controversially continuing to be discussed internationally among scientists and beekeepers.

== Symptoms ==
The symptoms of Nosema are relatively nonspecific, which makes it difficult to distinguish from other diseases of the honeybee. It arises mostly in the spring after periods of bad weather, although it may also be a winter disease that is only noticed in the spring when beekeepers first inspect their hives. The female worker bees are most strongly afflicted, less so the drones. The queen bee is rarely infected since afflicted bees rarely participate in feeding the queen. The most notable symptom is dysentery. This appears as yellow stripes on the outside of the hive and in severe cases, inside the hive. Bees may be unable to fly ("crawling") due to disjointed wings. The infection damages the bee's midgut, resulting in the necrosis of intestinal tissue. This impairs the bee's ability to digest food and absorb nutrients.

Further symptoms include increased girth of the abdomen, missing sting reflex, and early replacement of the queen. If the queen is infected, her ovaries degenerate and egg production drops due to atrophy of the oocytes, after which she is likely to be superseded. The disease pattern described by Higes et al.. in Spain for N. ceranae is slightly different from that of N. apis. The changes in the digestive system were substantially more serious than with N. apis, related to particularly heavy and spacious cell lesions. Conversely, classical symptoms were missing from N. ceranae, such as diarrhea, crawling, large numbers of dead bees in the apiary, etc. Bees tend to die away from the apiary, which causes a reduction in food gathered and can eventually lead to colony collapse. Ritter (CVUA Freiburg) reported symptoms can arise throughout the year from N. ceranae, in contrast to N. apis. In the winter, some colonies died within a short time and the bees lay dead in the box (in Spain, hives usually remained empty). Whether these features are related to the new form of Nosema cannot be conclusively proven.

== Transmission ==
Newly emerged bees are always free from infection. Spores must be swallowed by a bee for the infection to be initiated. The most common modes of transmission are fecal-oral and oral-oral, and it has been suggested that Nosema can be transmitted sexually in honey bees. Spores germinate quickly after entering the insect, and the epithelial cells of the ventriculus are infected when the vegetative stage is introduced by way of the hollow polar filament. Once inside a cell, the vegetative stage increases in size and multiplies, effecting an apparent concurrent reduction of RNA synthesis in the host cell. In six to 10 days, the infected host epithelial cells become filled with new spores. Epithelial cells are normally shed into the ventriculus where they burst – releasing digestive enzymes. When infected cells are shed similarly, they release 30–50 million infective spores when they burst.

== Effects on the hive ==
Nosema spores are spread to other colony members through fecal matter. The disease impairs the digestion of pollen, thereby shortening the life of the bee. A greater proportion of worker bees become infected than drones or queens, probably due to the comb-cleaning activities of young bees in which drones and queens do not participate. Nosema-infected bees do not attend or feed the queen to the same extent as healthy bees, which helps the queen to escape infection. When the queen becomes infected, her ovaries degenerate and her egg-laying capacity is reduced due to atrophy of the oocytes. Queens that become infected by the parasite during the brood-rearing season are superseded by the bees.

The seasonal trend of typical infections exhibits low levels during summer, a small peak in autumn, and a slow rise of infection during winter. It is more common during times of confinement - winter and spring. In the spring, the level of infection increases rapidly as brood-rearing starts and while flight possibilities are still limited. Colonies in northern climates are more seriously affected than colonies in the south because of the increased amount of time bees are confined in the hive. Nosema, if left untreated, can cause queen supersedure, winter kills, reduced honey yields, and dwindling populations.

== Diagnosis ==
Diagnosis is dependent on microscopic examination of the ventricular (midgut) content and/or fecal matter or on PCR analysis of infected tissue. No specific outward sign of disease may be present, although in dissections, the ventriculus often appears whitish and swollen in late stages of infection. The disease is easily detected in samples of whole bees macerated in water. The fluid is examined under a light microscope at 250–500 x magnification where the characteristic Nosema spores can be observed. Though the spores of N. apis and N. ceranae have slight morphological and ultrastructural differences, they cannot be reliably differentiated via light microscopy. PCR analysis or electron microscopy of spores are the only reliable ways to differentiate between the two types of Nosema infection, given genetic variation and variation in the number of sporular polar filament coils between the two species.

== Treatment ==
Treatment with the antibiotic Fumidil B (prepared from Aspergillus fumigatus, the causative agent of stonebrood), inhibits the spores reproducing in the ventriculus, but does not kill the spores. A disinfection of the honeycombs and utensils is recommended for an extensive disease outbreak.

The spores are sensitive to chemicals such as acetic acid and formaldehyde, and physical radiation: ultrasonic and gamma radiation.

Heat treatment in 49 °C (120 °F) for 24 hours can be used to kill the spores on contaminated equipment.

== See also ==
- Antibiotics
- Diseases of the honeybee
