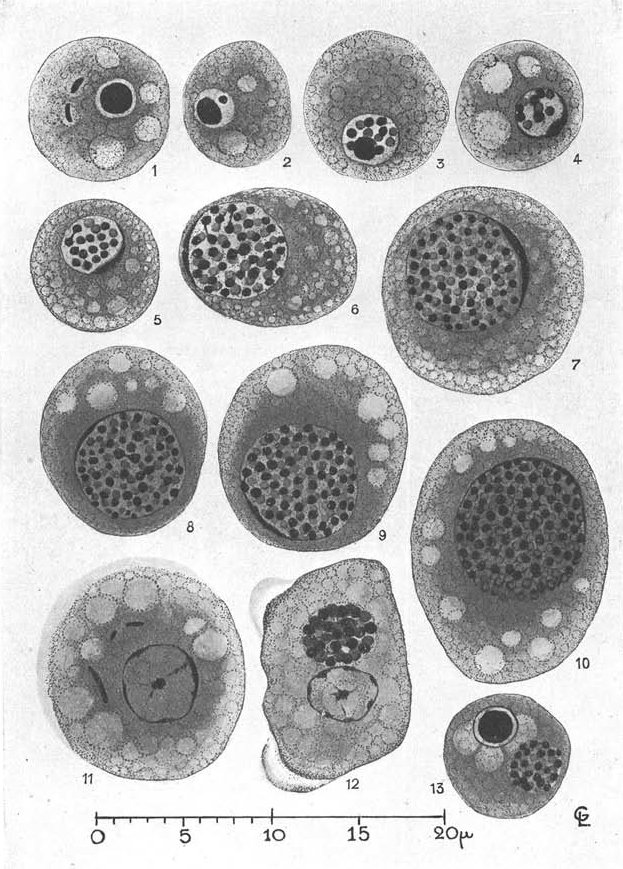
- Endolimax nana parasitized by Nucleophaga hypertrophica

Scientific classification
- Kingdom: Fungi
- Division: Microsporidiomycota
- Order: Nucleophagales Corsaro 2022
- Family: Nucleophagaceae Corsaro 2022
- Genus: Nucleophaga Dangeard 1895

Type species
- Nucleophaga amoebae Dangeard 1895

Species
- See text

= Nucleophaga =

Genus of fungi

Nucleophaga is a genus of eukaryotic microorganisms that are internal parasites of amoeba, flagellates, and ciliates.

== Morphology and life cycle ==
Nucleophaga grows within the nucleus of its host cell. Its spores are ingested by the host and migrate to the nucleus. Once in the nucleus, the spores germinate giving rise to naked plasmodia in contact with the host's karyoplasm. It develops pseudopodia-like projections that may be involved in osmotrophy or phagocytosis. The Nucleophaga cells continue to enlarge until a cell wall replaces the projections and the Nucleophaga cytoplasm is divided into spores.

== Taxonomy ==
Described by Dangeard in 1895, Nucleophaga was placed in Olpidiaceae, Chytridiales. Molecular phylogenetic studies have placed some members in the Cryptomycota/Rozellomycota.

=== Species ===
As according to a taxonomic summary.

- Nucleophaga amoebae Dangeard 1895
- Nucleophaga hypertrophica Epstein 1922
- Nucleophaga intestinalis Brug 1926
- Nucleophaga peranemae Hollande & Balsac 1941
- Nucleophaga ranarum Lavier 1935
- Nucleophaga terricolae Corsaro et al. 2006
