= Loma (microsporidian) =

Scientific classification
- Kingdom: Fungi
- Phylum: Rozellomycota
- Class: Microsporidia
- Order: Glugeida
- Family: Glugeidae
- Genus: Loma; Morrison & Sprague, 1981

Genus of microsporidians

Loma is a genus of microsporidian parasites, infecting fish. The taxonomic position of Loma in the family Glugeidae has been questioned by DNA sequencing results.

Species include

- Loma acerinae – formerly placed in Glugea
- Loma branchialis – the type species
- Loma camerounensis – a parasite of the cichlid fish, Oreochromis niloticus
- Loma dimorpha
- Loma morhua
- Loma myriophis – parasite of the ophichthid fish, Myrophis platyrhynchus
- Loma salmonae – a parasite of Pacific salmon, Oncorhynchus spp.
- Loma trichiuri - a parasite of a marine trichiurid fish, Trichiurus savala
