= Mitosporidium =

Scientific classification
- Kingdom: Fungi
- Division: Rozellomycota
- Class: Microsporidia
- Genus: Mitosporidium; Haag et al., 2015

Genus of parasitic fungi

Mitosporidium is a genus of microsporidian parasites. The genus was erected in 2014 but, for nomenclatural reasons, the taxon was valid only in 2015.

In contrast to most members of the Microsporidia, species in Mitosporidium have retained ancestral features such as mitochondrial respiration. However, they have a spore stage with a polar tube which is a unique characteristic of the Microsporidia, and they are intracellular parasites.

== Taxonomic placement ==
Mitosporidium is sometimes referred to as "microsporidia‐like protist" or "the earliest branching microsporidian". In the most recent (2024) classification of Fungi, Mitosporidium was considered to be a member of the Rozellomycota, with no more precise placement.

== Species ==
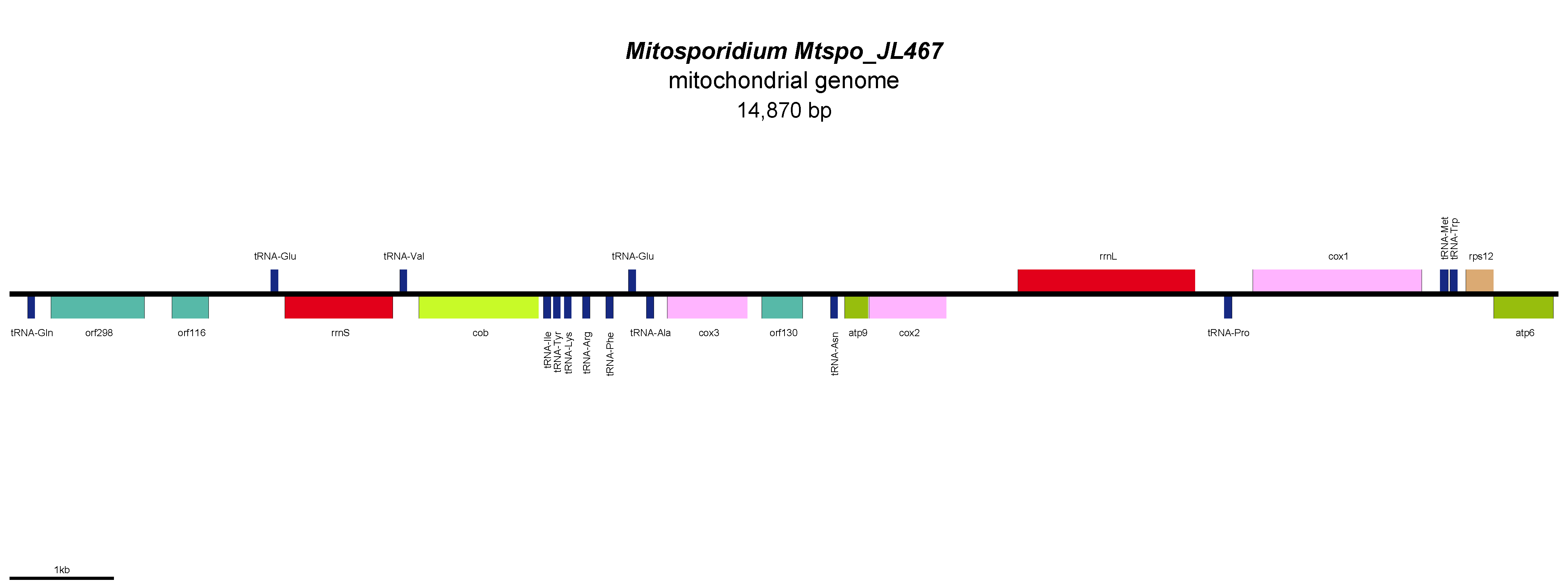
The mitogenome of Mitosporidium sp. 467

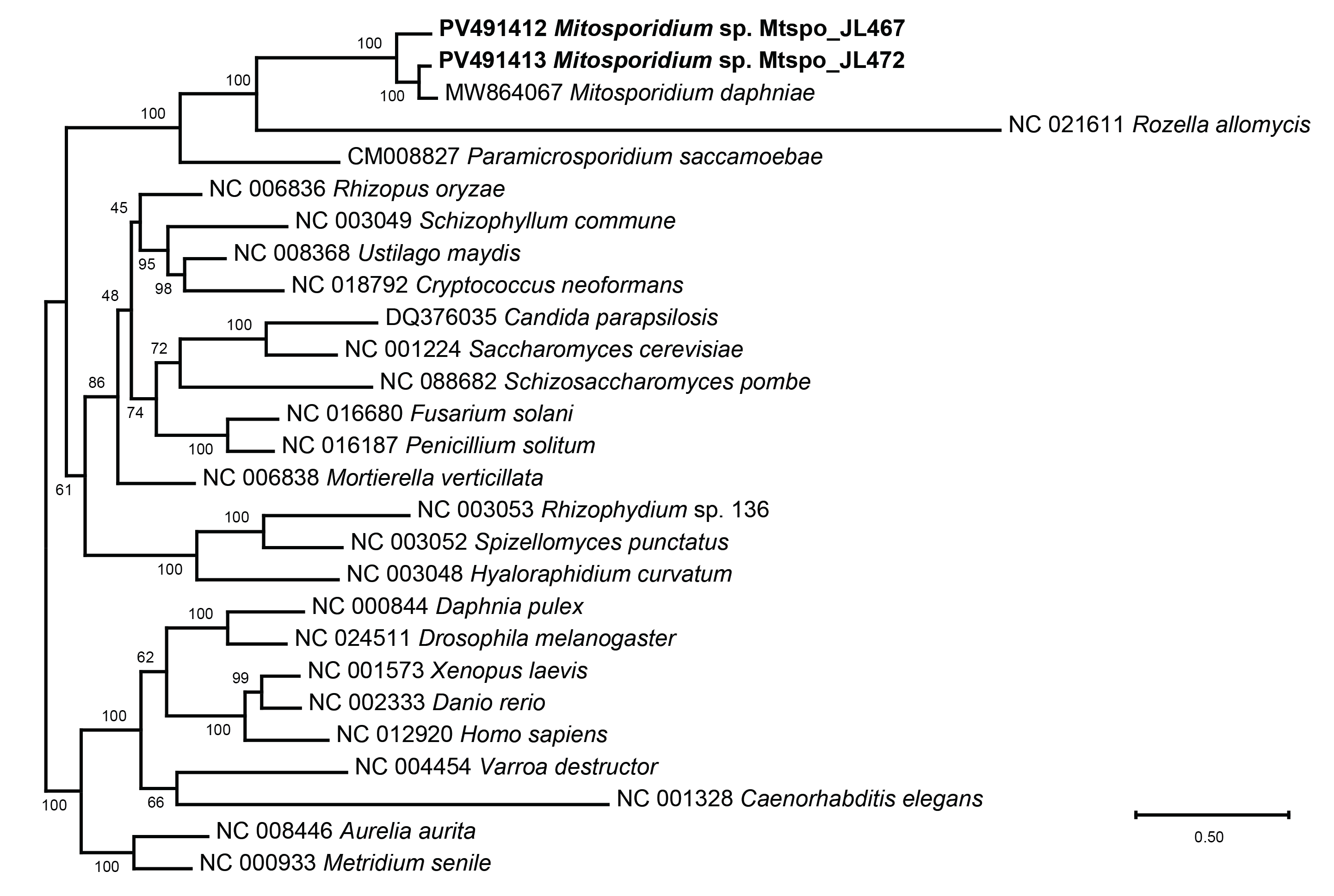
A phylogenetic tree of species of Mitosporidium and their closer relatives

Until 2025, the only known species of the genus was Mitosporidium daphniae Haag et al., 2015, a parasite infecting the hindgut epithelium of the freshwater crustacean Daphnia.

In 2025, researchers studying land flatworms from Northern Ireland reported genetic evidence of two additional species of Mitosporidium. Each land flatworm species was found to harbour its own Mitosporidium species: Australoplana sanguinea contained Mitosporidium sp. JL472, while Kontikia andersoni contained Mitosporidium sp. JL467. For nomenclatural reasons, these species could not be formally assigned binomial names. For both new species, the gene content of the mitogenome and the cluster of nuclear ribosomal RNA genes were described. However, it has not yet been fully determined whether the microsporidia are parasites of the land flatworms themselves or of the earthworms that constitute their prey.
