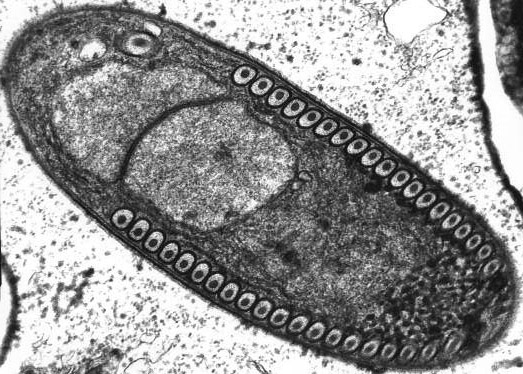
- Sporoblast of Fibrillanosema crangonycis

Scientific classification
- Kingdom: Fungi
- Phylum: Microsporidia
- Genus: Fibrillanosema
- Species: F. crangonycis

Binomial name
- Fibrillanosema crangonycis S. Galbreath, J.E. Smith, R.S. Terry, J.J. Becnel & A.M. Dunn

= Fibrillanosema crangonycis =

Species of microsporidian

Fibrillanosema crangonycis is a species of fungus in the phylum Microsporidia. This species is morphologically identical to uncharacterized microsporidia from populations of North American amphipods. It is, however, distinct from microsporidia found in European populations of amphipods.
