= Chytridiopsida =

Scientific classification
- Kingdom: Fungi
- Phylum: Rozellomycota
- Class: Chytridiopsidea Issi, 1980
- Order: Chytridiopsida Weiser, 1974

Order of microsporidians

Chytridiopsida is an order of microsporidians in the monotypic class Chytridiopsidea.

== Taxonomy ==
- Phylum Rozellomycota Dowell, 2013
  - Class Chytridiopsidea Issi 1980 – not recognized by the Outline, which instead gives "Rozellomycota Orders incertae sedis"
    - Order Chytridiopsida Weiser 1974
      - Family Buxtehudeidae Larsson 1980
      - Family Hesseidae Ormières & Sprague 1973
      - Family Chytridiopsidae Sprague, Ormières & Manier 1972

== Former families ==
- Burkeidae
- Enterocytozoonidae
