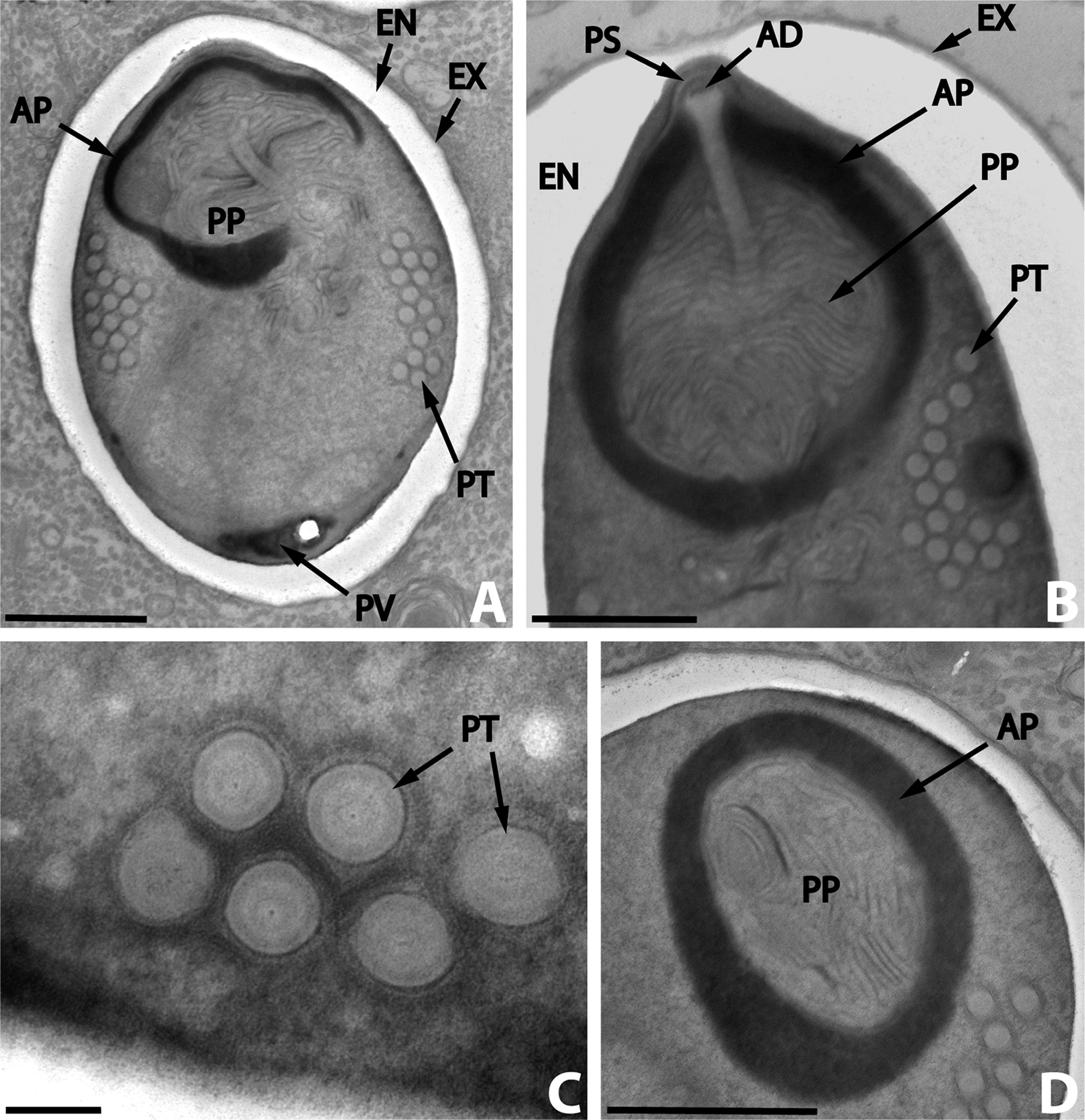
- Nosema podocotyloidis

Scientific classification
- Kingdom: Fungi
- Division: Rozellomycota
- Class: Microsporidia
- Suborder: Apansporoblastina
- Family: Nosematidae; Labbé, 1899

= Nosematidae =

Family of microsporidian fungi

The Nosematidae are a family of microsporidians from the order Nosematida known for parasitizing insects.

== Genera ==
As in the Journal of Invertebrate Pathology:

- Nosema
- Vairimorpha
