= Hazardia (microsporidian) =

Scientific classification
- Domain: Eukaryota
- Kingdom: Fungi
- Phylum: Rozellomycota
- Class: Microsporidea
- Order: Amblyosporida
- Genus: Hazardia; Weiser, 1977

Type species
- Hazardia milleri (Hazard & Fukuda 1974) Weiser 1977

Species
- H. milleri; H. usbekistanica

Genus of microsporidian

Hazardia is a genus of microsporidians that parasite insects, with the type host being Culex pipiens. It is currently classified as incertae sedis within the order Amblyosporida of phylum Rozellomycota.

== Description ==
Hazardia is characterized by three sporulation sequences that occur primarily in the fat body of larval mosquitoes:

First sequence: small, oval binucleate spores are generated, and they encyst into sporonts.

Second sequence: diplokaryotic (i.e. with paired nuclei) sporonts divide through binary fission to produce lanceolate, thick-walled binucleate spores with a rugose exospore.

Third sequence: the most common sequence, it involves uninucleate sporonts that form sporogonial plasmodia that divide by multiple fission producing between 2 and 16 uninucleate spores (usually 8) that are pyriform and thin walled.

== Ecology ==
The transmission of Hazardia between mosquitoes is per os, meaning through the mouth.

== Taxonomy ==
There are two species:

- Hazardia milleri (Hazard & Fukuda 1974) Weiser 1977 (type species)
- Hazardia usbekistanica Khodzhaeva 1988
