= Xenoma =

Growth caused by various species of protists and fungi

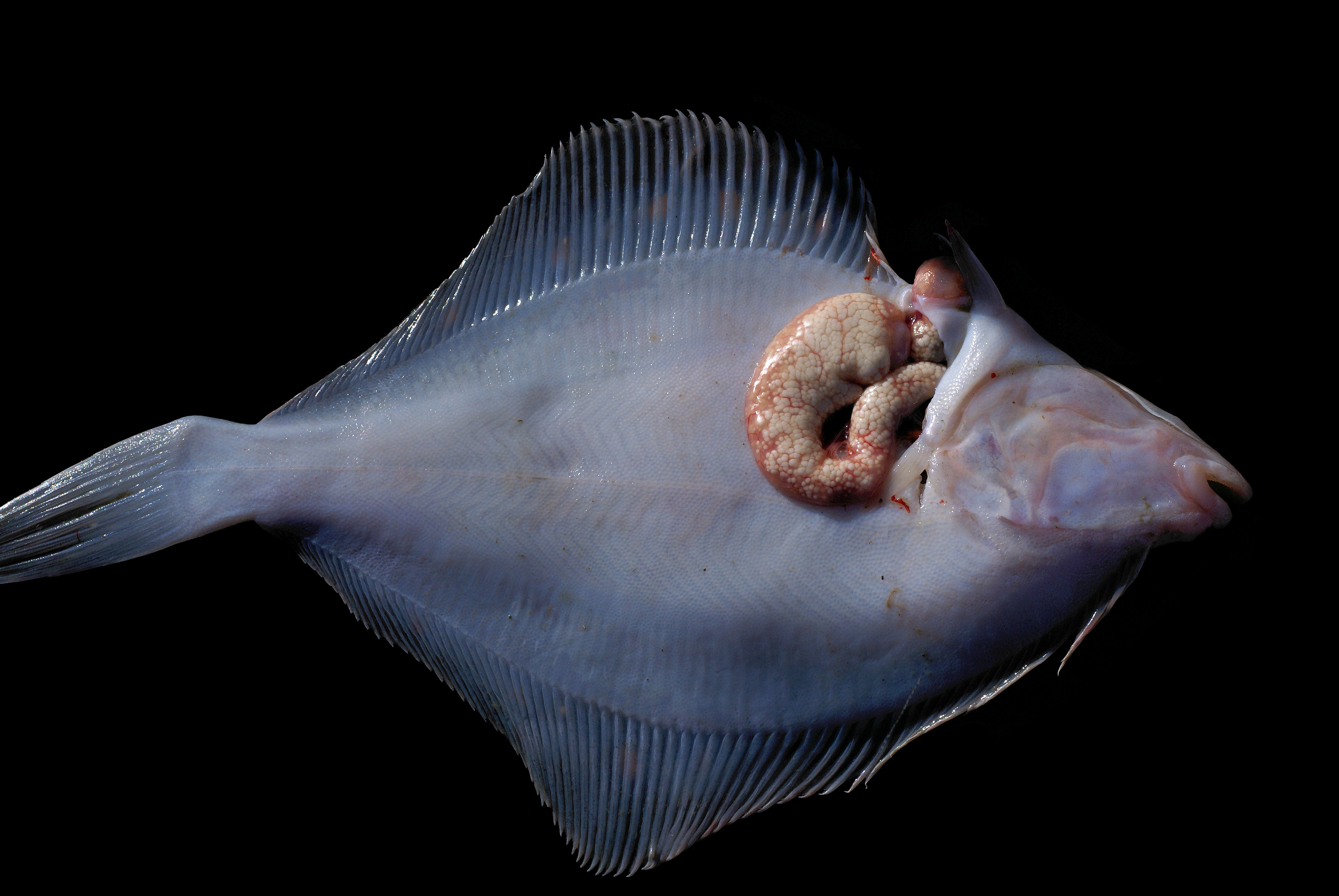
Xenoma on the flatfish Limanda limanda

A xenoma (also known as a 'xenoparasitic complex') is a growth caused by various protists and fungi, most notably microsporidia. It can occur on numerous organisms; however is predominantly found on fish.

In most cases the host cell and nuclei suffers from hypertrophy resulting in a change in organisation of the cell and its structure and can result in polyploid nuclei. This outcome is due to the microsporidian parasite proliferating inside the host cell. This results in a 'symbiotic co-existence' between the parasite and the host cell. This forms the xenoparasitic complex. They tend to contain numerous cellular components as well as microsporidia at different developmental stages and spores.

Not all microsporidia infections result in the formation of xenomas; only a few microsporidia actually cause xenoma formation.

== History ==
Xenoparasitic complex was the term initially devised in the early twentieth century to describe specific type 'tumours' found on various organisms, specific as the infections were caused by multiple subclasses of microsporidia. A paper published in 1922 by Weissenberg came up with the term 'xenon' for the xenoparasitic complexes he observed on sticklebacks caused by Glugea anomala, before eventually changing it to xenoma (xenon was already the name of a newly discovered chemical element).

Hypertrophy of cells caused by protists and fungi has been observed since the late nineteenth century. Scientists observed them in several organisms, of which the infection would have varied host cell specificity, ultimately leading to different cellular consequences. For example, the dinoflagellate protist Sphaeripara catenata induces hypertrophy, polyploid nuclei formation whilst forming a thick-walled hyposome where rhizoids extend into the cytoplasm for nutrient absorption in the appendicularian Fritillaria pellucida. This can be contrasted to the Microsporidium cotti infection of the testes of Taurulus bubalis where a dense microvillus layer is present for improved nutrient absorption.

== Pathogenesis ==
Xenomas are provoked in various types of organisms, depending on the species of the parasite. Microsporidia are known to produce xenomas in oligochaetes, insects, crustaceans and fish. In addition to organism specificity, different species of parasite will have distinct host cell specificity, even if targeting the same organism. For example, Microsporidium chaetogastris infects solely connective and muscle tissue cells of the annelid Chaetogaster diaphanus, whereas other species of microsporidia will target other tissue types. Another example is microsporidial gill disease in different species of fish caused by Loma salmonae. It was found that certain species had a higher prevalence of xenoma formation following infection with the same parasite i.e. xenomas per gill filament in chinook salmon was 8 to 33 times greater than in rainbow trout, showing differences in host cell susceptibility.

Once a host cell is infected with the microsporidian (or protist) parasite, a complete restructuring of the host cell ensues. This occurs as the parasite seeks to take control of the metabolism of the cell, in order to survive and exploit the host cell's resources and reproduction. It provides the parasite with optimal growth conditions and protection from the host's immune response. The parasite proliferates within the host cell where its mass replaces most of the host cell's cytoplasm, with the rest being taken up by microvillus structures and rhizoids. Other structures may be present inside the infected host cell including vesicles, fat globules and bundles of fibril. The nucleus may be in varying locations including the centre of the cell and may also vary in structure i.e. lobed, branched or divided into multiple fragments, but it will always be hypertrophic. The host also commonly envelops the proliferating parasite and the host cell itself in layers of membranes and cells.

In microsporidian xenomas the whole life cycle is restricted to the xenoma; this however differs between different protists. The life cycle predominantly follows a simple life cycle consisting of merogony followed by sporogony. Occasionally the endoplasmic reticulum associates with meronts, which are formed during merogony, and is lost once sporogony ensues. The time it takes for a xenoma to develop varies entirely on the host organism and cell as well as the infecting parasite. It can vary, however it usually starts to form after a few weeks following infection, depending on the life cycle of the parasite. The size of xenomas also varies with the type of parasite and host organism, and can range from a few micrometres to several millimetres.

While it is generally accepted that the xenoma prevents spread of the parasite throughout the host organism, it is not entirely accurate. As the species that cause xenomas are spore-forming, it is possible that their spores may release their sporoplasms which penetrate the xenoma wall, infiltrating and infecting surrounding cells. In microsporidia this is mediated by a unique and highly specialised protein: the polar tube. This specialised protein is found inside the spore and is in contact with the sporoplasm. Specific environmental stimulation causes the spore to discharge the polar tube which penetrates the xenoma membrane and provides an exit route for the sporoplasm. This is thought to be a form of autoinfection. Rupture of the xenoma may also result in dispersal of the infectious spores. This can lead to the formation of other and more persistent forms of xenomas.

Transmission of such pathogens occurs predominantly via oral administration when in contact or in the vicinity of diseased organisms via the release of infectious spores. However, there are reports of obtaining infection in some organisms through the skin. Experimentally inducing infection and xenoma formation can be performed intramuscularly, intravascularly and intraperitoneally. It is widely thought that the first site of entry for many of these parasites is in the gastrointestinal tract where enzymes such as pepsin or even an alkaline pH shift (caused by the mucous layer prominent in this area) induces polar tube discharge. Following this their migration from their initial release to their final destination in the host cell varies considerably, depending on the pathogen, the host organism and the host cell location. It was discovered through in situ hybridization that the microsporidia Loma salmonae enters the mucosal epithelium in the intestine and migrates to the lamina propria before arriving at the gills, where it eventually resides, via infecting blood cells. Other transport vehicles are thought to include T cells, lymphocytes, and other migratory cells including monocytes where they succumb to infection by means of either phagocytosis of the parasite in the lamina propria or by infiltration by sporoplasms using their polar tube. It is also very possible that these transport cells might themselves develop into a xenoma.

== Xenomas in fish ==
Microsporidia is a common cause of disease in fish and so xenomas tend to be seen more frequently in fish than in other organisms. A paper published in 2002 listed 15 genera and 157 microsporidian species that cause disease in fish, however only ten of these genera induce xenoma formation. Microsporidia genera that cause xenomas can therefore be quite diverse and so are characterised more comprehensively into several groups depending on their morphology:

- Xenomas without a thick wall and where the complete volume of the original cell is not converted into a xenoma
- Xenomas without a thick wall and where the complete volume of the original cell is converted into a xenoma
- Xenomas with plasmalemma surrounded by host fibrils
- Xenomas with a thick wall

Recently fish-infecting microsporidia have been grouped into five classes depending on their molecular traits, a higher level of classification using SSU (small subunit) rDNA analysis. However molecular data is still lacking for several genera of microsporidia.

=== Xenomas found in other organisms ===
Whilst xenomas are more highly characteristic of fish, they can be quite extensive in other organisms including crustaceans, insects, oligochaetes and other vertebrates. Microsporidian xenomas that develop in fish can also occur in crustaceans. Roughly 43 microsporidian genera have been found to infect crustaceans, with at least 23 microsporidian species found in shrimp, most of them infecting muscular tissue. Other species also infect the digestive tract, reproductive organs and their hepatopancreas. Xenoma-like formations have also been found in species of shrew caused by Soricimyxum fegati, a type of myxosporea, showing they can also occur in mammals.

== Treatment ==
The host can eventually destroy the xenoma. Proliferative inflammation occurs in mature xenomas and transforms them into granulomas. Granuloma involution then ensues where phagocytosis kills the spores.

Studies have shown it is possible to vaccinate against xenomas. One study showed that developing a vaccine using a 10^{3} to 10^{5} dose of killed spores from a low-virulence strain of Loma salmonae resulted in rainbow trout producing 85% less xenomas in their gills after experimental infection (compared to the control). This ultimately offers much improved protection to microsporidial gill disease which is common amongst rainbow trout. Therapeutic drugs have proved ineffective at treating this disease and harvesting whole-spores is a relatively easy technique.

== See also ==
- Microsporidia
- Glugea
- Spore
