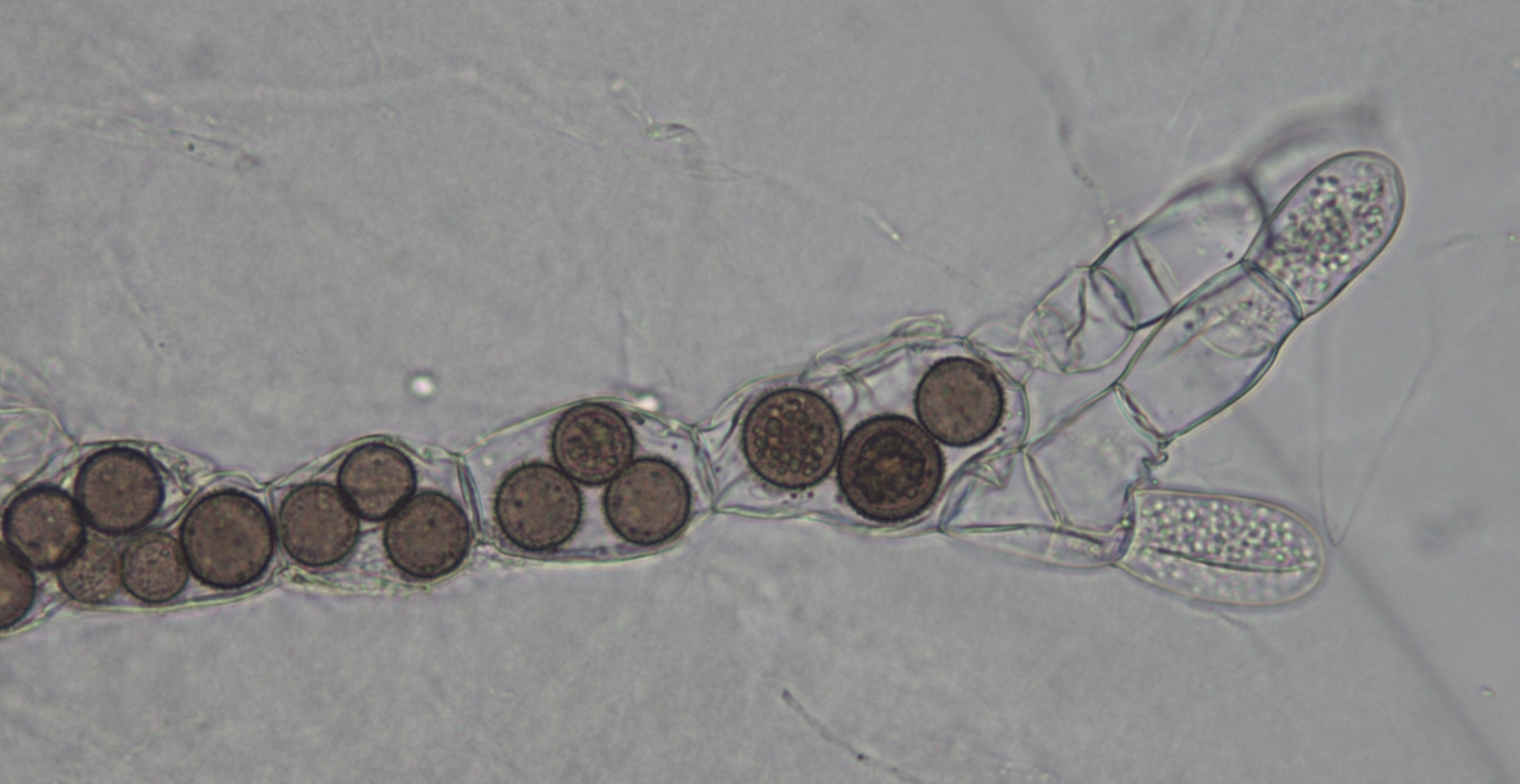

Scientific classification
- Kingdom: Fungi
- Subkingdom: Rozellomyceta; Tedersoo, Sánch.-Ram., Kõljalg, M. Bahram, M. Döring, Schigel, T.W. May, M. Ryberg & Abarenkov

Synonyms
- Opishophagea Galindo et al. 2023

= Rozellomyceta =

Subkingdom of Fungi

Rozellomyceta is a subkingdom in the kingdom Fungi. In the consensus accepted by fungus researchers as of 2024, it contains only the Rozellomycota, which in turn contains Microsporidia as a class.

An earlier view by fungus researchers divides it into two phyla, the Rozellomycota and Microsporidia as a phylum. A more fitting name for Microsporidia as a phylum could be Microsporidiomycota Benny 2007. This is no longer done because "recent phylogenies indicate that Microsporidia are deeply nested within Rozellomycota".

Protistologists do not agree with the assignment of this subkingdom as fungi, because they subscribe to a narrow view of fungi as an osmotropic-only lineage (the eumycota), while this clade is largely phagotrophic. They believe that this clade should be the responsibility of protozoologists.

- Under older protist classification, the included taxa are sometimes classified under the subkingdom Sarcomastigota within the kingdom Protozoa instead, although Sarcomastigota is considered paraphyletic.
- Under another style of protist classification, this group belongs in Opisthosporidia. This too is paraphyletic.
- Protists that have accepted the current phylogeny proposes the name Opishophagea for what they call "Rosalida + Microsporidia".
