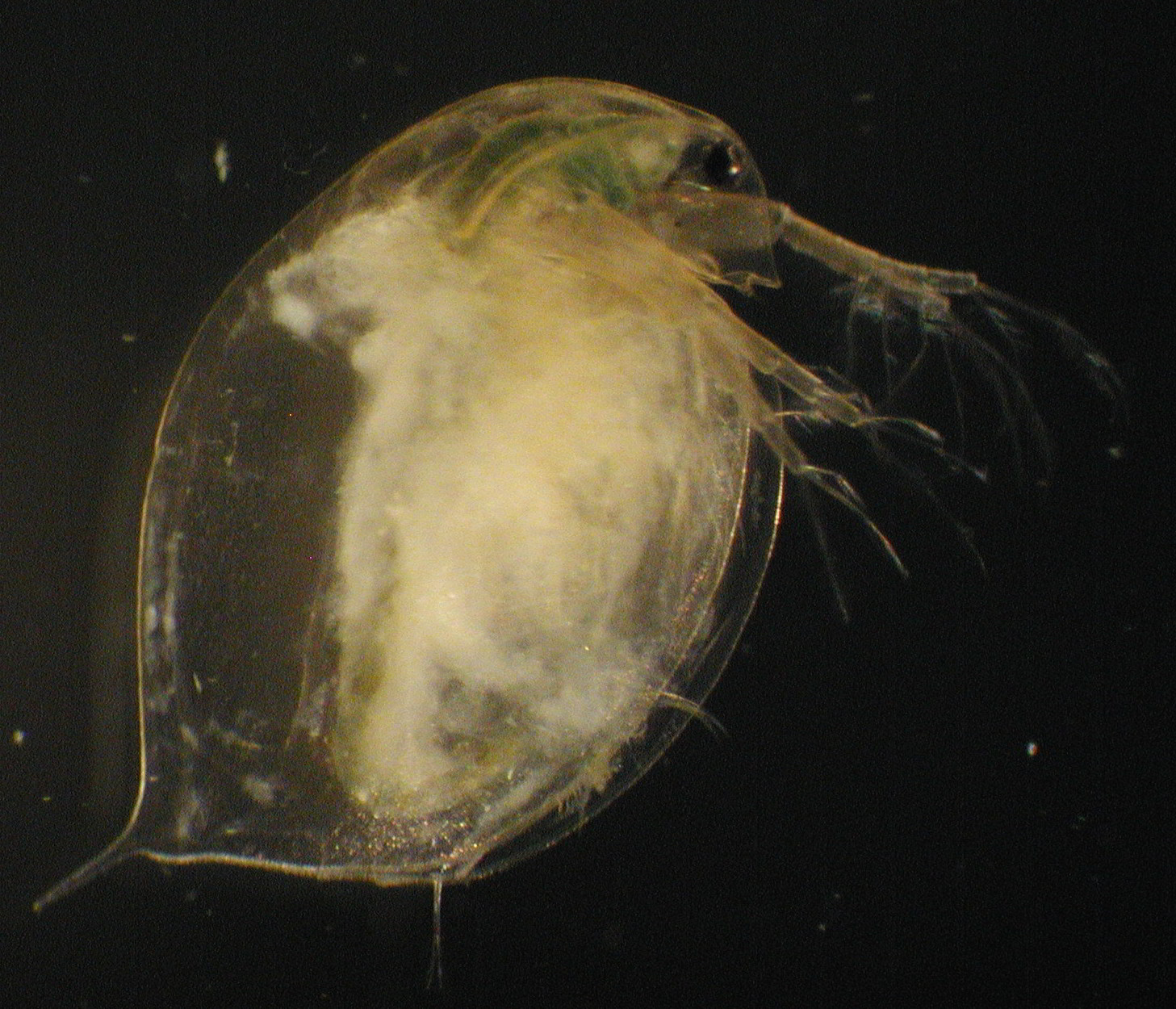
- Daphnia magna infected with Hamiltosporidium tvaerminnensis

Scientific classification
- Kingdom: Fungi
- Division: Microsporidia
- Order: Meiodihaplophasida
- Family: Duboscqiidae
- Genus: Hamiltosporidium Haag, 2010

Species
- Hamiltosporidium tvaerminnensis Hamiltosporidium magnivora

= Hamiltosporidium =

Genus of fungi

Hamiltosporidium is a genus of Microsporidia, which are intracellular and unicellular parasites. The genus, proposed by Haag et al. in 2010, contains two species; Hamiltosporidium tvaerminnensis, and Hamiltosporidium magnivora. Both species infect only the crustacean Daphnia magna (Waterflea).

D. magna and H. tvaerminnensis are a frequently used model organism to study coevolution and local adaptation.

== Classification ==
In 2010 these two species were moved to the new genus Hamiltosporidium. Previously H. tvaerminnensis was wrongly identified as Octosporea bayeri Jírovec, 1936, a parasite of D. magna described in Czech Republic which was never found again. H. magnivora was formerly named Flabelliforma magnivora Larsson, 1998 and belonged to the Flabelliforma genus, before its close phylogenetic relation to H. tvaerminnensis was discovered.

== Distribution ==
Infection of Daphnia populations by Hamiltosporidium have been recorded in the United Kingdom, Russia, Belgium and Israel (H. magnivora), as well as Sweden, Finland and Israel (H. tvaerminnensis). While its host D. magna is found all over the northern hemisphere, the two Hamiltosporidium species seem to have a limited geographic distribution. Genetic differences in host susceptibility have been suggested to contribute to the geographic distribution of H. tvaerminnensis.

== Morphology and life cycle ==
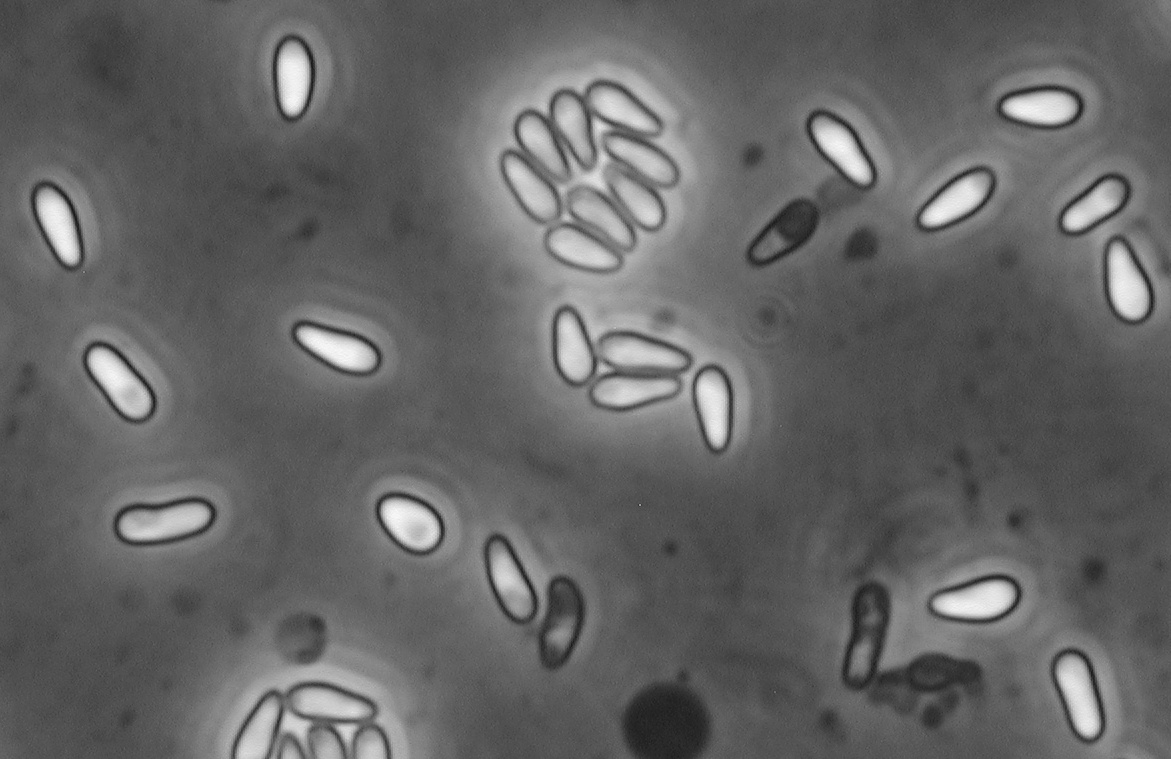
Mostly pyriform spores of Hamiltosporidium tvaerminnensis

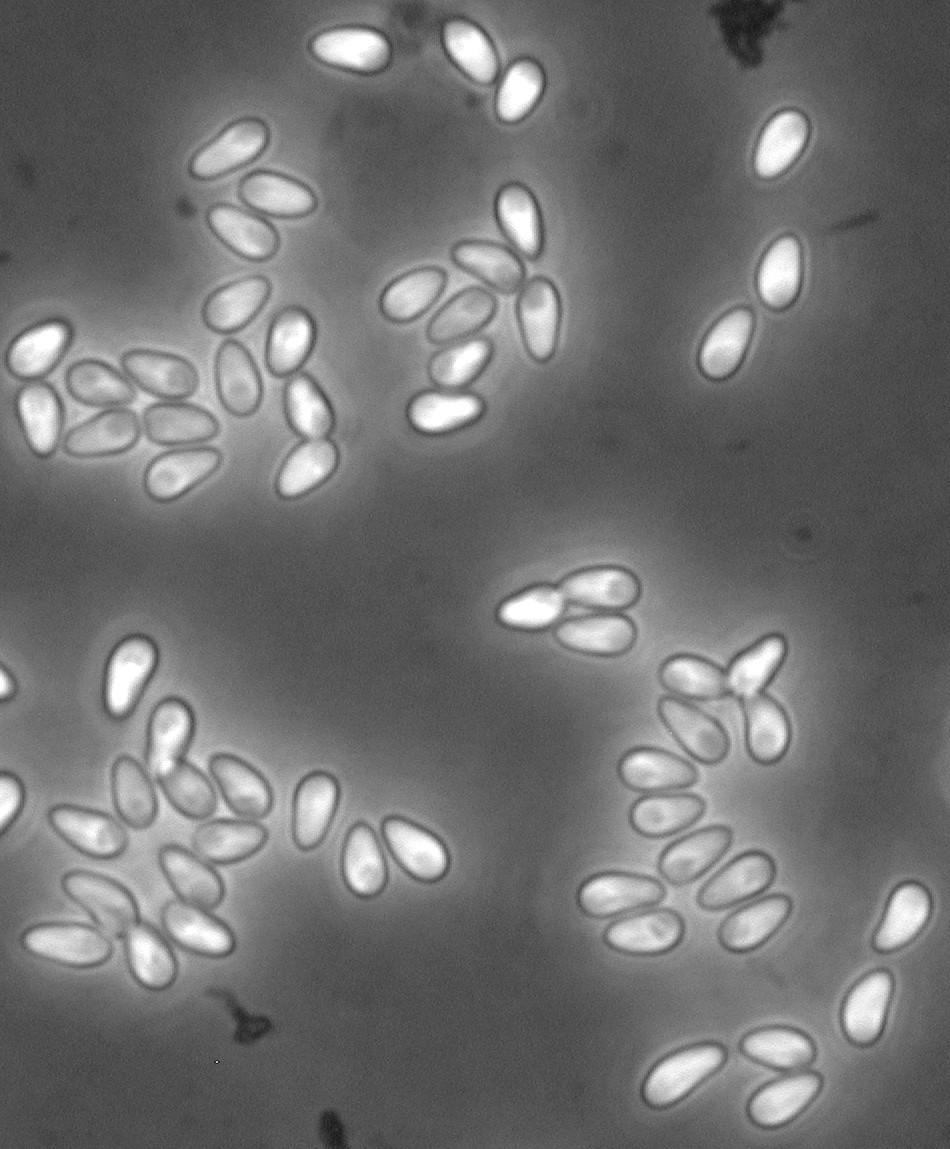
Spores of Hamiltosporidium magnivora

H. magnivora reproduces sexually, while H. tvaerminnensis has an obligatory asexual status. All stages of vegetative reproduction (merogony) are enclosed by a thick plasma membrane, which is in direct contact with the cytoplasma of the host cell. In all stages the nuclei is isolated and clearly visible. The onset of the sporogony is the production of a sporophorous vesicle that is connected to the plasma membrane by tubules. Then fabelliform budding of mostly eight sporoblasts into the vesicle is initiated. Initially the wall of the encysted spore (sporont) has two layers. During the maturating of the sporont two generations of tubules are present in the episporontal space, being reduced at maturity. Mature spores of the genus Hamiltosporidium are polymorph, though pyriform and elongated rod-like spores dominate in H. tvaerminnensis while H. magnivora has lightly pyriform spores only. Pyriform spores measure 4·9–5·6 x 2·2–2·3 μm while elongated spores measure 6·8–12·0 x 1·6–2·1 μm in H. tvaerminnensis. Lightly pyriform spores in H. magnivora measure 2.34-3.03 x 4.07-4.93 μm. The polar filaments in the mature spore are more or less isofilar and the polaroplast has 2 – 3 distinct lamellar regions.

== Infection ==
The unicellular parasites infect the crustacean Daphnia magna. Both species H. magnivora and H. tvaerminnensis infect the fat body, the hypodermis and the ovaries of the crustacean. Infection can be detected by examining crushed animals under a phase contrast microscope (400x). In advanced stages of the infection spores are found in the whole body cavity of host animals, which leads to a clearly visible whitish coloration. The infection leads to reduction in the host fitness by reducing life expectancy, fecundity and competitive ability for resources among D. magna.

== Transmission ==
In H. tvaerminnensis horizontal transmission occurs after the host's death, when spores from decaying cadaver suspend in the water. Spores can persist in the environment, being able to infect new hosts after extended periods of time. Horizontal transmission could not be observed in the lab for H. magnivora but it is suggested to happen in nature as witnessed in H. tvaerminnensis. Both parasite species are vertically transmitted to asexual host offspring with a transmission rate of up to 100% and a somewhat lower transmission rate to sexual offspring (transmission rates have only been reported for H. tvaerminnensis). This means that the parasite is hardly lost in a clone lineage and also survives inside the resting eggs of its host. Thereby it can be kept in a population even though the host is resting while the habitat is dried up or frozen. Because of its combined vertical and horizontal transmission strategies, H. tvaerminnensis can reach prevalence of up to 100% in asexual populations in nature as well as in the laboratory.

== Genome ==
In 2009 a first draft of H. tvaerminnensis genome was sequenced (under the name of Octosporea bayeri). The whole genome has approximately the size of 24.2 Mega-bases (Mb). This stands in contrast to other sequenced microsporidia genomes (for example the compact 2.9 Mb genome of the obligate parasite Encephalitozoon cuniculi) which are reduced in size. It is suggested that H. tvaerminnensis genome is the largest known microsporidian genome. Almost half of the genome sequence was found to be unique for H. tvaerminnensis. Compared to smaller microsporidian genome, Gene density is rather low in H. tvaerminnensis but variable.

The H. tvaerminnensis population in the Baltic Sea is genetically very homogeneous. So far there were only two main haplotype found in the whole population. Comparison of the genetic diversity to its sister species H. magnivora revealed H. tvaerminnensis asexuality.
