= Freshwater phytoplankton =

Phytoplankton occurring in freshwater ecosystems

Freshwater phytoplankton is the phytoplankton occurring in freshwater ecosystems. It can be distinguished between limnoplankton (lake phytoplankton), heleoplankton (phytoplankton in ponds), and potamoplankton (river phytoplankton). They differ in size as the environment around them changes. They are affected negatively by the change in salinity in the water.

== Ecology ==
=== Temperature ===
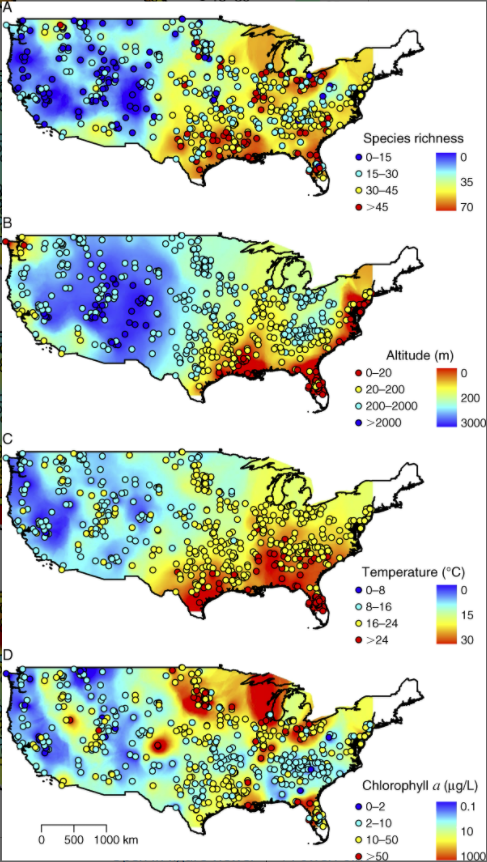
Geographical distribution of phytoplankton species richness across the continental United States: (A) phytoplankton species richness, (B) altitude, (C) annual mean water temperature, (D) annual mean chlorophyll a concentration

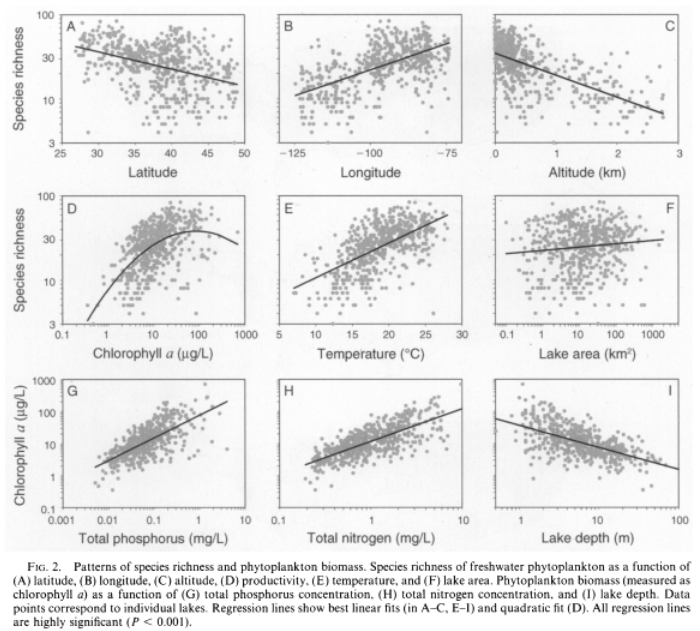
Patterns of Species Richness and phytoplankton biomass

Temperature correlates with various characteristics of phytoplankton community: in a study of American freshwater plankton by Huisman et al, higher temperatures correlates with increased species richness, increased overall biomass, and decreased cell size. This may have serious implications under global warming, as given lower phytoplankton biomass with the same cell density would provide less food to the grazers and higher trophic levels, and smaller size may favour consumers that are able to access them at the expense of those that prefer larger algae.

=== Chlorophyll α ===
Chlorophyll α is the core photosynthetic pigment that all phytoplankton possess. Concentrations of this pigment, which can be measured remotely, is used as a proxy for phytoplankton biomass in a given location general, the more chlorophyll a, the more phytoplankton biomass, although the CHL a to C ratio May vary between species, and even within the species.

=== Water body characteristics ===
Freshwater phytoplankton shows a strong correlation with both surface area and depth of the water body they inhabit. Species richness increases in larger lakes with surface area and decreases in deeper lakes. Decreases due to depth are associated with lower chlorophyll α concentrations.

=== Salinity ===
Almost all freshwater phytoplankton die when salinity levels exceed 8%. Between 0% and 8% however, some species may grow preferentially with some amount of salt available. This may be due to the presence of the salt itself, or the hydrodynamic processes that occur with water stratified due to unequal salinity.

=== Light utilization ===
Cyanobacteria are adapted to low light environments and thus utilize light very efficiently. This is believed to be the result of the time period in which they evolved. About 3.8 billion years ago solar luminosity was ~30% lower than present conditions. Cyanobacteria were able to adapt to this low light and thrive off the nutrient dense conditions.

Green algae are a high-light adapted group. They utilize light relatively inefficiently and need high levels of light to live.

Diatoms are competitive in low light, however, they do not use light as efficiently as cyanobacteria. They are adapted to mixed conditions that consist of interchanging periods of low and high light.

Mixotrophs, like dinoflagellates, do well in low light conditions. This may not be due to an efficient use of light however, but more so due to their ability to move independently and their mixotrophy.

== Spring bloom ==
The factor that promotes the occurring of spring bloom are light availability, phytoplankton physiology, nutrients, temperature, grazing, virus lysis. Phytoplankton begins to emerge when the sun begins to heat the surface of the water, creating a layered layer of warmer, less dense water that traps phytoplankton near the surface, where they are exposed to sunlight. Fresh water also has a positive effect on the growth of phytoplankton, since it is less dense, creates a layered water column and carries nutrients necessary for phytoplankton to carry out processes (photosynthesis). Collapse can be caused by nutrient depletion, vertical mixing when nutrients are at the bottom, resulting in less bloom. Also due to the high grazing pressure of zooplankton and decrease in illumination.

== Eutrophication ==
Imbalance in nutrients can lead to issues such as hindered carbon storage capacity, plant productivity, and disrupted nutrient cycling. An increase in nutrients such as nitrogen and phosphorus can lead to substantial growth of phytoplankton that can cause harm to aquatic ecosystems. This abundance may be caused by agricultural fertilizers, urban runoff, industrial discharges, and even natural sources. Although nutrients promote spring bloom, an excessive abundance drastically speeds up photosynthesis and one negative result of this is a phenomenon known as eutrophication, characterized by substantial algae growth which form algal blooms. When nutrients promote these blooms, sunlight is blocked and becomes limited to more underwater plants, leading to depleted oxygen levels in the water, which result in anoxic or hypoxic conditions that harm ecosystems. Overall, nutrient imbalance of increased nitrogen and phosphorus can affect phytoplankton growth and cause detrimental effects for the food web and aquatic life as a whole.

== Classification ==
A functional classification has been constructed to divide different species into different brackets based on: seasonal shifts, water body characteristics, morphology, nutrient availability, light intensity, as well as others. The current list contains 31 different alphanumeric terms that each represent a trait-differentiated functional group.

== Monitoring and Remote Sensing Technologies For Freshwater Phytoplankton ==
Monitoring of freshwater phytoplankton is essential for assessing ecosystem health, water quality management, and early warning of harmful algal blooms (HABs). Traditional monitoring includes water sampling followed by microscopy, pigment analysis, or molecular analysis to identify species and biomass. Remote sensing technologies have become increasingly important in recent years for large-scale, real-time monitoring. Satellite sensors such as MODIS (Moderate Resolution Imaging Spectroradiometer) and Sentinel-3's OLCI (Ocean and Land Colour Instrument) can estimate surface concentrations of chlorophyll-a, an indicator of phytoplankton abundance. These sensors enable surveillance of spatial and temporal trends in phytoplankton dynamics in large aquatic ecosystems. Drones and in situ sensors like fluorometers and spectroradiometers are increasingly being employed for high-resolution surveillance at local spatial scales. The integration of remote sensing data with hydrological and climatic models enhances the ability of bloom forecasting, management action, and public health notice.
