= Albert Fleischmann =

German zoologist (1862–1942)

Albert Fleischmann (June 28, 1862 – November 19, 1942) was a German zoologist.

== Career ==
Fleischmann was born in Nuremberg, Kingdom of Bavaria. He studied comparative embryology at the University of Erlangen in Bavaria. He obtained his Ph.D. in 1885. He became assistant professor of zoology and comparative anatomy in 1896 and professor in 1898. In 1901, he published a book, Die Descendenztheorie, which attacked Darwinism, evolution and theories of common descent.

In 1907, Vernon Lyman Kellogg described Fleischmann as the "only biologist of recognized position, of whom I am aware, who publicly declares disbelief in the theory of descent." Paleontologist William Berryman Scott noted that Fleischmann was "almost entirely alone in modern biological literature because of his anti-evolutionary views." His anti-evolutionary writings were criticized by biologist August Weismann and zoologist Sinai Tschulok.

Fleischmann married Franziska Kiefl in 1902; they had one son, Rudolf. He was involved in forming the Erlangen bee breeding institute in 1907. He was the author of a popular zoology textbook and a book containing a series of lectures from 1921 to 1922 at the University of Erlangen. He retired in 1933.

== Publications ==
- Embryologische Untersuchungen (3 volumes, 1889-1893)
- Lehrbuch der Zoologie. Nach morphogenetischen Gesichtspunkten (1896-1898)
- Die Descendenztheorie (1901)
- Die Darwinsche Theorie (1903)
- Beiträge zur Naturgeschichte der Honigbiene (1910) [with Theodor Weippl and Enoch Zander]
- Der Entwicklungsgedanke in der gegenwärtigen Natur- und Geisteswissenschaft (1922)
- Einführung in die Tierkunde (1928)
- The Doctrine of Organic Evolution in the Light of Modern Research (1933)

== See also ==
- Otto Kleinschmidt
