= Buxtehudeidae =

Scientific classification
- Kingdom: Fungi
- Division: Rozellomycota
- Class: Microsporidia
- Order: Chytridiopsida
- Family: Buxtehudeidae Larsson, 1980

Genus of parasitic fungi

Buxtehudeidae is a family of microsporidian fungi. It contains two species in two genera, Buxtehudea scaniae and Jiroveciana limnodrili. Both genera are parasitic: Buxtehudea infects archaeognath bristletails, while Jiroveciana infects tubifex worms.
