= Hessea (microsporidian) =

Scientific classification
- Domain: Eukaryota
- Kingdom: Fungi
- Phylum: Rozellomycota
- Class: Microsporidia
- Order: Chytridiopsida
- Family: Hesseidae
- Genus: Hessea
- Species: H. squamosa

Binomial name
- Hessea squamosa Ormières (1973)

Genus of parasitic fungi

Hessea is the type genus of the monotypic microsporidian family Hesseidae, described in 1973. Hessea itself is monotypic, containing only the type species Hessea squamosa. It is a parasite of the larvae of the Sciara fungus gnats, infesting the gut epithelium.
