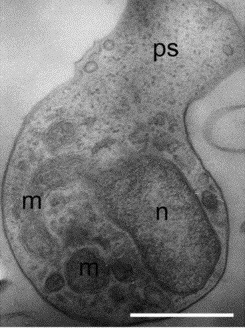
- Amoeboid zoospore of Amoeboaphelidium protococcarum. ps = pseudopodium, m = mitochondrion, n = nucleus. Scale bar: 1 μm.

Scientific classification
- Kingdom: Fungi
- Subkingdom: Aphelidiomyceta
- Division: Aphelidiomycota; Tendersoo et al. 2018
- Subdivision: Aphelidiomycotina; Tendersoo et al. 2018
- Class: Aphelidiomycetes; Tendersoo et al. 2018
- Order: Aphelidiales; Tendersoo et al. 2018
- Family: Aphelidiaceae; Tedersoo et al. 2018

Genera
- Amoebaphelidium; Aphelidium; Paraphelidium; Pseudaphelidium

= Aphelida =

Phylum of fungi

Aphelida are a phylum of fungi that appears to be the sister to true fungi.

== Taxonomy ==
- Phylum Aphelidiomycota Tedersoo 2018 [Aphelida Karpov, Aleoshin & Mikhailov 2014]
  - Class Aphelidiomycetes Tedersoo 2018 [Aphelidea Gromov 2000]
    - Order Aphelidiales Tedersoo 2018 [Aphelidida Gromov 2000 non Cavalier-Smith 2012]
      - Family Aphelidiaceae Tedersoo 2018 [Aphelididae Gromov 2000 Amoeboaphelidiidae Cavalier-Smith 2012]
        - Genus Amoeboaphelidium Scherffel 1925 emend. Karpov 2014
        - Genus Aphelidium Zopf 1885 emend. Gromov 2000
        - Genus Paraphelidium Karpov, Moreira & Lopez-Garcia 2017
        - Genus Pseudaphelidium Schweikert & Schnepf 1996
