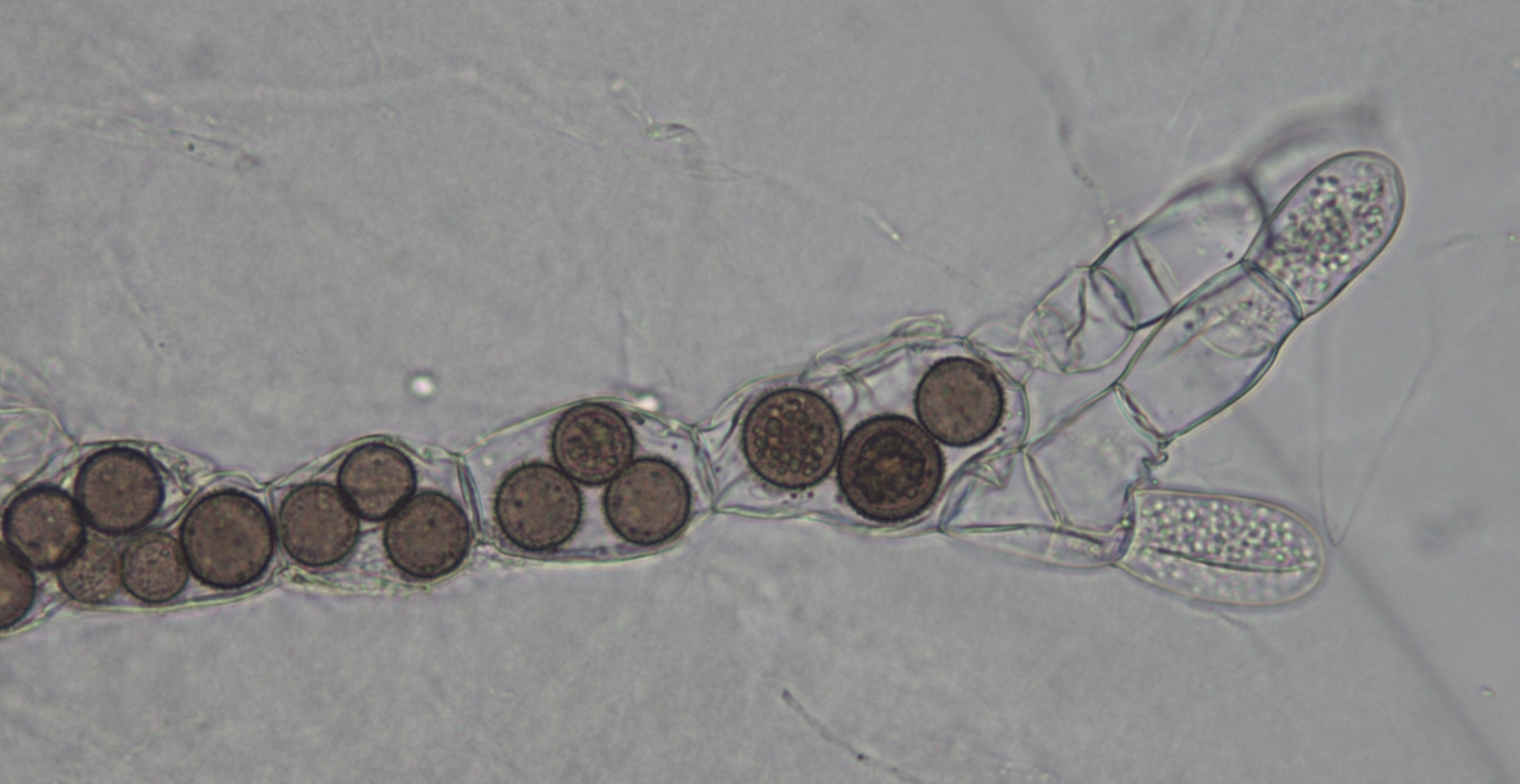
- (Rozella) Rozella allomycis parasitizing the chytrid Allomyces sp.

Scientific classification
- Domain: Eukaryota
- (unranked): Opisthokonta
- (unranked): Holomycota
- Kingdom: Fungi
- Subkingdom: Rozellomyceta
- Phylum: Rozellomycota Doweld 2013

Classes, orders, and lower taxa incertae sedis
- Class Rudimicrosporia Sprague [Metchnikovellea Weiser 1977 em. Cavalier-Smith 1993, Manubrispora Cavalier-Smith 1998]; Order Metchnikovellida Vivier 1977; Family Metchnikovellidae Caullery & Mesnil 1897; Family Amphiacanthidae Larsson 2000; Class Microsporidia ex Corliss & Levine 1963 – see linked article; Orders incertae sedis: Order Chytridiopsida Weiser 1974; Family Buxtehudeidae Larsson 1980; Family Hesseidae Ormières & Sprague 1973; Family Chytridiopsidae Sprague, Ormières & Manier 1972; Families incertae sedis: Family Astathelohaniidae Stratton, Reisinger, Behringer, Bojko; Genera incertae sedis: Nucleophaga Dangeard; Mitosporidium Haag, James, Pombert, Larsson, Schaer, Refardt & Ebert; Morellospora D. Corsaro, J. Walochnik, D. Venditti, B. Hauröder & R. Michel; Paramicrosporidium Corsaro, Walochnik, Venditti, Steinmann, Müller & Michel; Rozella Cornu

= Rozellida =

Clade of microscopic fungi

Cryptomycota ('hidden fungi'), Rozellida, or Rozellomycota are a clade of micro-organisms that are either fungi or a sister group to fungi. They differ from classical fungi in that they lack chitinous cell walls at any trophic stage in their lifecycle, as reported by Jones and colleagues in 2011. Despite their unconventional phagocytic feeding habits (typical fungi are osmotrophic), chitin has been observed in the inner layer of resting spores, and in immature resting spores for some species of Rozella, as indicated with calcofluor-white stain as well as the presence of a fungal-specific chitin synthase gene.

== History ==
=== Formation of the Rozellida concept ===
Rozellida were first detected as DNA sequences retrieved from a freshwater laboratory enclosure. Phylogenetic analysis of these sequences formed a unique terminal clade of then unknown affiliation provisionally called after the first clone in the clade: LKM11.

The term "Rozellida" was coined in 2010, as it was found that the formally described genus Rozella, previously considered a chytrid, is rather close to LKM11 and other newly-discovered environmental DNA sequences.

Additional members of the group were isolated in 2011 by a team led by Thomas Richards, from the Natural History Museum in London, and also an evolutionary geneticist at the University of Exeter, UK. The team used DNA techniques to disclose the existence of unknown genetic material dredged from the university pond. Once they had a few unknown sequences they fluorescently labeled small DNA sequences and let them bind to the matching DNA in the whole sample (fluorescence in situ hybridization). Under fluorescence microscopy, they could see that the possessor cells were ovoid in shape and 3–5 micrometres across. They then established that the Cryptomycota were present in other samples taken from further freshwater environments, soils and marine sediments.

The common characteristic of the clade members known as of 2011 is that they lack the chitinous cell walls present in almost all previously discovered fungi (including microsporidia) and which are a major feature of the kingdom. Without the chitin the Cryptomycota can be phagotrophic parasites that feed by attaching to, engulfing, or living inside other cells. Most known fungi feed by osmotrophy—taking in nutrients from outside the cell.

Despite their unconventional phagocytic feeding habits (typical fungi are osmotrophic), chitin has been observed in the inner layer of resting spores, and in immature resting spores for some species of Rozella, as indicated with calcofluor-white stain as well as the presence of a fungal-specific chitin synthase gene.

=== Inclusion of Microsporidia ===
In the 2010 article where "Rozellida" was proposed, the authors mentioned that some protein-based analyses suggest that Microsporidia could be closely related to Rozellida. Their own SSU rDNA analysis was unsutiable for this purpose, as Microsporidia is known to have very high mutation rates resulting in long-branch attraction. An rRNA analysis can only be done after there are more sequences, preferably those close related to both "Rozellida" and Microsporidia, to guide the algorithm into finding the true shape of the tree.

A 2014 rDNA analysis by Karpov et al. considers the group, which they now call "Cryptomycota", sister to Microsporidia. The same article lead to the concept of Opisthosporidia (Aphelid + Cryptomycota + Microsporidia), which as a whole was found in the analysis to be sister to fungi.

Also in 2014, Corsaro et al. discovered two new endonucleoparasites they termed Paramicrosporidium. Their SSU rDNA sequences allowed the authors to find that Microsporidia is nested in the Rozellids (which they call "Rozellomycota"). In the same year, they discovered a living Nucleophaga amoebae (described in 1895 and previously also considered a chytrid) and sequenced its SSU rDNA, placing it in Rozellomycota. Both of these genera are shown to branch out in the path connecting Rozella and Microsporidia. These two genera show morphological features similar to both Rozella and Microsporidia, and as a result provide some explanation for the large difference between the two.

In 2018, Tedersoo et al. performed a large phylogenetic study on fungi and related taxa to establish a new set of high-ranking taxa. Trees were built using SSU rDNA, RPB1 protein, and RPB2 protein. The study once again confirmed that Microsporidia belongs in Rozellomycota. After the 2020 Outline of Fungi and fungus-like taxa has accepted the conclusion (and provided an even bigger SSU rDNA tree), it is generally accepted that Microsporidia does, in fact, belong in the Rozellomycota.

== Phylogeny ==
Phylogeny of Rozellomycota. Backbone from Wijayawardene et al. (2020), later insertions to the tree referenced by footnotes.

- Fungi
  - - Aphelidiomycota
    - Eumycota
  - Rozellomyceta (node 0)
    - (node 2)
      Rozella
    - (node 1)
      - LKM15
        - Mitosporidium
        - Morellospora
      - - - Paramicrosporidium
          - LKM11
        - - Nucleophaga
          - Microsporidia s.l.
            - Chytridiopsida
              Chytridiopsis
            - - Rudimicrosporia
              - Microsporidia s.s.

=== Approaches to circumscription ===
There are some unresolved issues in cutting up the phylogeny. The main question is that since Rozella branches off early in the phylogeny, some authors elect to give the genus a phylum of its own, giving the rest of the tree ("node 1") a separate "Microsporidiomycota" which would also include LKM11. The relatively authoritative Outline does not divide in such a way, electing to use one phylum ("node 0") like Tedersoo et al. (2018) and Wijayawardene et al. (2018) have done.

The 2020 Outline discusses the related issue of expanding Microsporidia to include Nucleophaga, Paramicrosporidium, Morellospora and Mitosporidium (equivalent to "node 1" above) by Bass et al. (2018), though at that time Opisthosporidia was still thought to be a clade.

There is also the less radical idea of expanding Microsporidia to include the entire clade sister to Nucleophaga. The Outline currently chooses not to, while Corsaro et al. 2020 does and labels the old clade as "classical Microsporidia". The Corsaro idea is labeled as "Microsporidia s.l." in the above.

=== Synonymy ===
The broadest node (node 0; Rozellomycota Doweld 2013 as interpreted by Outline) has also been known as:

- Rozellida Lara et al. 2010 non Cavalier-Smith 2013 – does not specify position of Microsporidia due to known issues with long branches, but does mention the possibility of being closely affiliated to it; choice of type sequences implies inclusion given newer data
- Cryptomycota Jones & Richards 2011 – does not address Microsporidia, but choice of type sequences implies inclusion given newer data
- Rozellomycota T. James & Berbee 2011 – does not specify position of Microsporidia, scope not clearly defined but implied to be the same as Cryptomycota Jones & Richards 2011
- Rozellomycota D. Corsaro & R. Michel 2014 – first synonym to definitely include Microsporidia
- Rozellomyceta Tedersoo et al. 2018
- Rozellomycotina Tedersoo et al. 2018 (same publication as above)

The branch leading to Rozella ("node 2") is also known as:

- Rozellaceae Doweld 2013
- Skirgielliaceae Doweld 2014
- Rozellales Corsaro 2022
- (Because there are no named representatives of this branch outside of Rozella, the synonyms listed on Rozella also apply here)

The following has unsure placement in the tree:

- "Rozellomycetes" Tedersoo 2017 – no citation given
- Rozellida Cavalier-Smith 2013 non Lara et al. 2010 – considered sister to Aphelids, which would suggest "node 0", but also excluding Microsporidia, which is similar to "node 2"
- Cryptomycota Jones & Richards 2011 em. Karpov & Aleoshin 2014 – considered sister to the Microsporidia, which translates into a paraphyletic position somewhere between "node 0" and "node 2". Microsporidia is described as having "nonmotile walled spore", while Cryptomycota has "opithokont zoospore".
- Rozellosporidia Karpov 2017– considered synonymous in; yet does not specify position of Microsporidia, but wording seems to imply an exclusion and mostly reuses the phylogeny of

=== Additional names not recognized by the Outline ===
- Class Rozellidea Cavalier-Smith 2013: Rozellida + Aphelida. This is similar to the Opisthosporidia discussed in Rozellomyceta, though again with the exclusion of Microsporidia.
- Class Chytridiopsida Issi 1980: monotypic for Chytridiopsidea.
- Order Paramicrosporidiales Corsaro 2022
  - Family Paramicrosporidiaceae Corsaro 2022 – monotypic
- Order Morellosporales Corsaro 2022
  - Family Mitosporidiaceae Corsaro 2022 – monotypic
  - Family Morellosporaceae Corsaro 2022 – monotypic
- Order Nucleophagales Corsaro 2022
  - Family Nucleophagaceae Corsaro 2022 – monotypic
