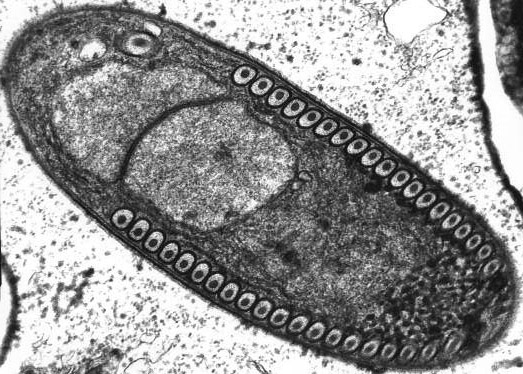
- Sporoblast of Fibrillanosema crangonycis

Scientific classification
- Kingdom: Fungi
- Division: Rozellomycota
- Class: Microsporidia ex Corliss & Levine 1963

Orders
- Amblyosporida Tokarev & Issi; Neopereziida Tokarev & Issi; Ovavesiculida Tokarev & Issi; Glugeida Gurley emend. Tokarev & Issi; Nosematida Labbe emend. Tokarev & Issi; (A number of former classes and orders are moved to Rozellomycota.)

Synonyms
- Phylum Microsporidiomycota Benny 2007; Class Microsporidia Balbiani, 1882; Order Microsporidiida Labbé, 1899; Order Cnidosporidia Doflein 190?; Class Microsporea Delphy, 1936 [1963], Levine et al., 1980; Class Microsporidea Corliss & Levine 1963; Phylum Microspora Sprague, 1969, 1977; Order Microsporida Tuzet et al. 1971; Class Terresporidia Vossbrinck & Debrunner-Vossbrinck; Order Microsporidies Balbiani 1882; Order Cryptocystes Gurley 1893

= Microsporidia =

Phylum of fungi

Microsporidia are a group of spore-forming parasitic unicellular fungi. These spores contain an extrusion apparatus that has a coiled polar tube ending in an anchoring disc at the apical part of the spore. They were once considered protozoans or protists, but are now known to be fungi, or a sister group to true fungi. These fungal microbes are obligate eukaryotic parasites that use a unique mechanism to infect host cells. They have recently been discovered in a 2017 Cornell study to infect Coleoptera (beetles) on a large scale. So far, about 1500 of the probably more than one million species are named. Microsporidia are restricted to animal hosts, and all major groups of animals host microsporidia. Most infect insects, but they are also responsible for common diseases of crustaceans and fish. The named species of microsporidia usually infect one host species or a group of closely related taxa. Approximately 10 percent of the known species are parasites of vertebrates—several species, most of which are opportunistic, can infect humans, in whom they can cause microsporidiosis.

After infection they influence their hosts in various ways and all organs and tissues are invaded, though generally by different species of specialised microsporidia. Some species are lethal, and a few are used in biological control of insect pests. Parasitic castration, gigantism, or change of host sex are all potential effects of microsporidian parasitism (in insects). In the most advanced cases of parasitism the microsporidium rules the host cell completely and controls its metabolism and reproduction, forming a xenoma.

Replication takes place within the host's cells, which are infected by means of unicellular spores. These vary from 1–12 μm, making them some of the smallest eukaryotes. Microsporidia that infect mammals are 1.0–4.0 μm. They also have the smallest eukaryotic genomes.

The terms "microsporidium" (pl. "microsporidia") and "microsporidian" are used as vernacular names for members of the group. The name Microsporidium Balbiani, 1884 is also used as a catchall genus for incertae sedis members.

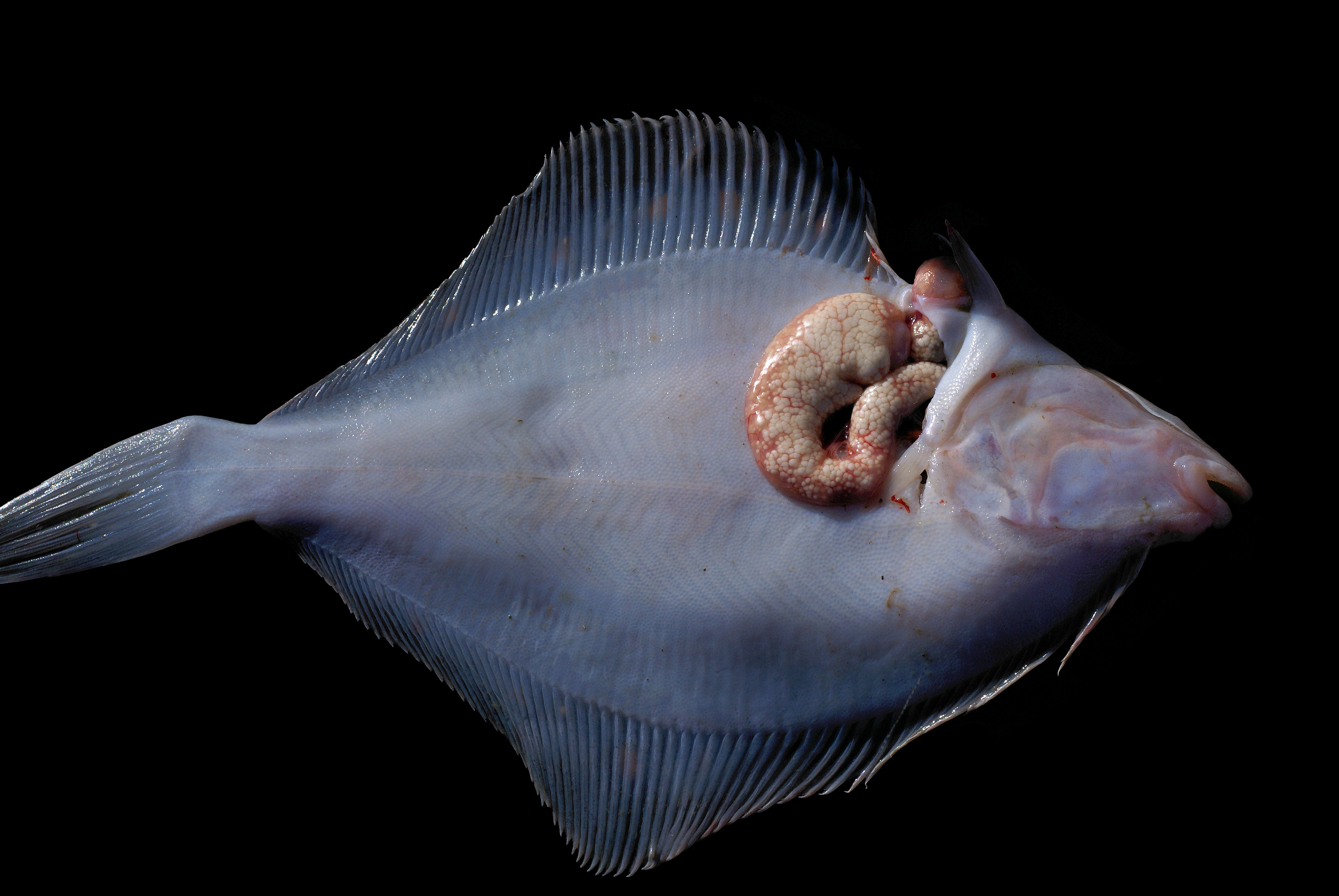
Xenoma on flatfish caused by Glugea stephani

== Morphology ==
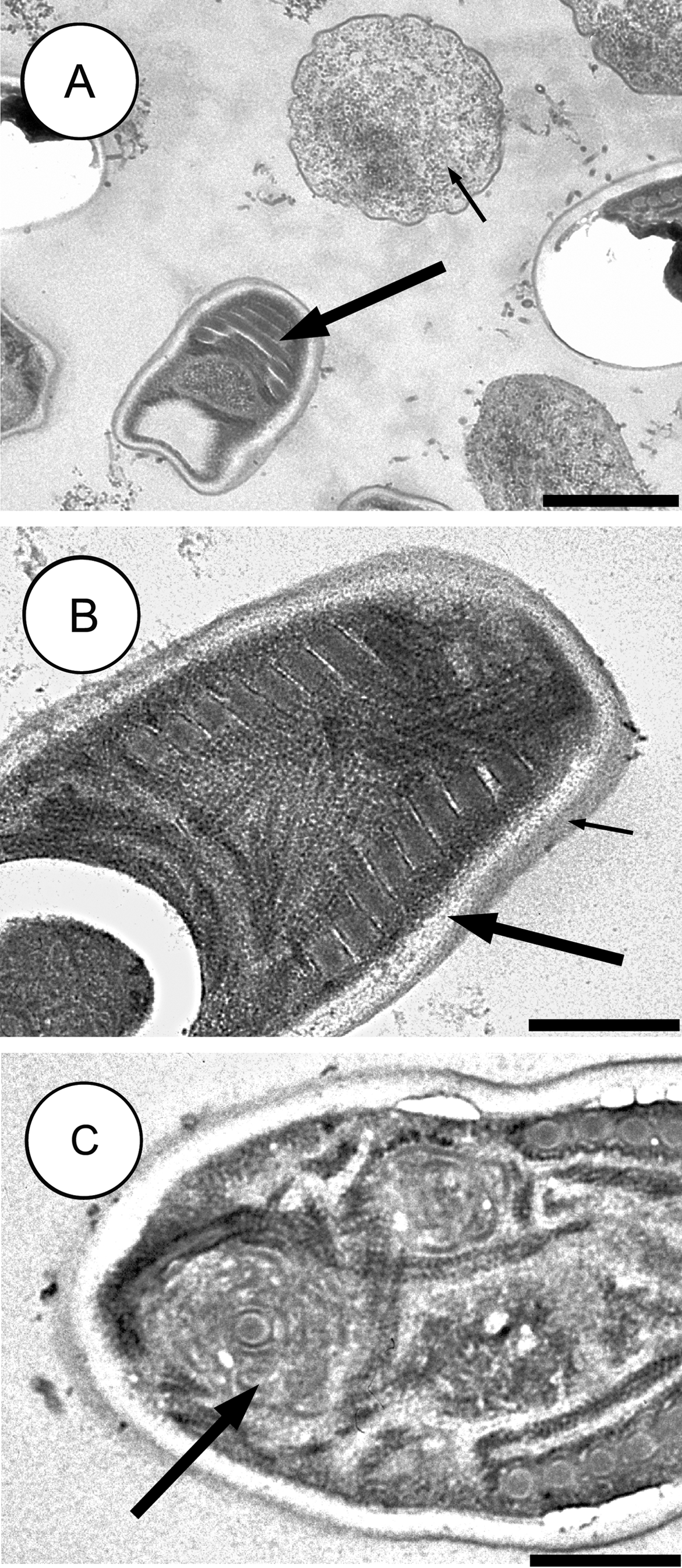
Dictyocoela diporeiae. A, meront and spore; B, spore wall; C, polar filament

Microsporidia lack mitochondria, instead possessing mitosomes. They also lack motile structures, such as flagella.

Microsporidia produce highly resistant spores, capable of surviving outside their host for up to several years. Spore morphology is useful in distinguishing between different species. Spores of most species are oval or pyriform, but rod-shaped or spherical spores are not unusual. A few genera produce spores of unique shape for the genus.

The spore is protected by a wall, consisting of three layers:

- an outer electron-dense exospore
- a median, wide and seemingly structureless endospore, containing chitin
- a thin internal plasma membrane

In most cases there are two closely associated nuclei, forming a diplokaryon, but sometimes there is only one.
The anterior half of the spore contains a harpoon-like apparatus with a long, thread-like polar filament, which is coiled up in the posterior half of the spore. The anterior part of the polar filament is surrounded by a polaroplast, a lamella of membranes. Behind the polar filament, there is a posterior vacuole.

== Infection ==
The spore germinates in the gut of the host; it builds up osmotic pressure until its rigid wall ruptures at its thinnest point at the apex. The posterior vacuole swells, forcing the polar filament to rapidly eject the infectious content into the cytoplasm of the potential host. Simultaneously the material of the filament is rearranged to form a tube which functions as a hypodermic needle and penetrates the gut epithelium.

Once inside the host cell, a sporoplasm grows, dividing or forming a multinucleate plasmodium, before producing new spores. The life cycle varies considerably. Some have a simple asexual life cycle, while others have a complex life cycle involving multiple hosts and both asexual and sexual reproduction. Different types of spores may be produced at different stages, probably with different functions including autoinfection (transmission within a single host).

== Medical implications ==
In animals and humans, microsporidia often cause chronic, debilitating diseases rather than lethal infections. Effects on the host include reduced longevity, fertility, weight, and general vigor. Vertical transmission of microsporidia is frequently reported.

In the case of insect hosts, vertical transmission often occurs as transovarial transmission, where the microsporidian parasites pass from the ovaries of the female host into eggs and eventually multiply in the infected larvae. Amblyospora salinaria n. sp. which infects the mosquito Culex salinarius Coquillett, and Amblyospora californica which infects the mosquito Culex tarsalis Coquillett, provide typical examples of transovarial transmission of microsporidia. Microsporidia, specifically the mosquito-infecting Vavraia culicis, are being explored as a possible 'evolution-proof' malaria-control method. Microsporidian infection of Anopheles gambiae (the principal vector of Plasmodium falciparum malaria) reduces malarial infection within the mosquito, and shortens the mosquito lifespan. As the majority of malaria-infected mosquitoes naturally die before the malaria parasite is mature enough to transmit, any increase in mosquito mortality through microsporidian-infection may reduce malaria transmission to humans. In May 2020, researchers reported that Microsporidia MB, a symbiont in the midgut and ovaries of Anopheles arabiensis, significantly impaired transmission of P. falciparum, had "no overt effect" on the fitness of host mosquitoes, and was transmitted vertically (through inheritance).

=== Clinical ===
Microsporidian infections of humans sometimes cause a disease called microsporidiosis. At least 14 microsporidian species, spread across eight genera, have been recognized as human pathogens. These include Trachipleistophora hominis.

== As hyperparasites ==
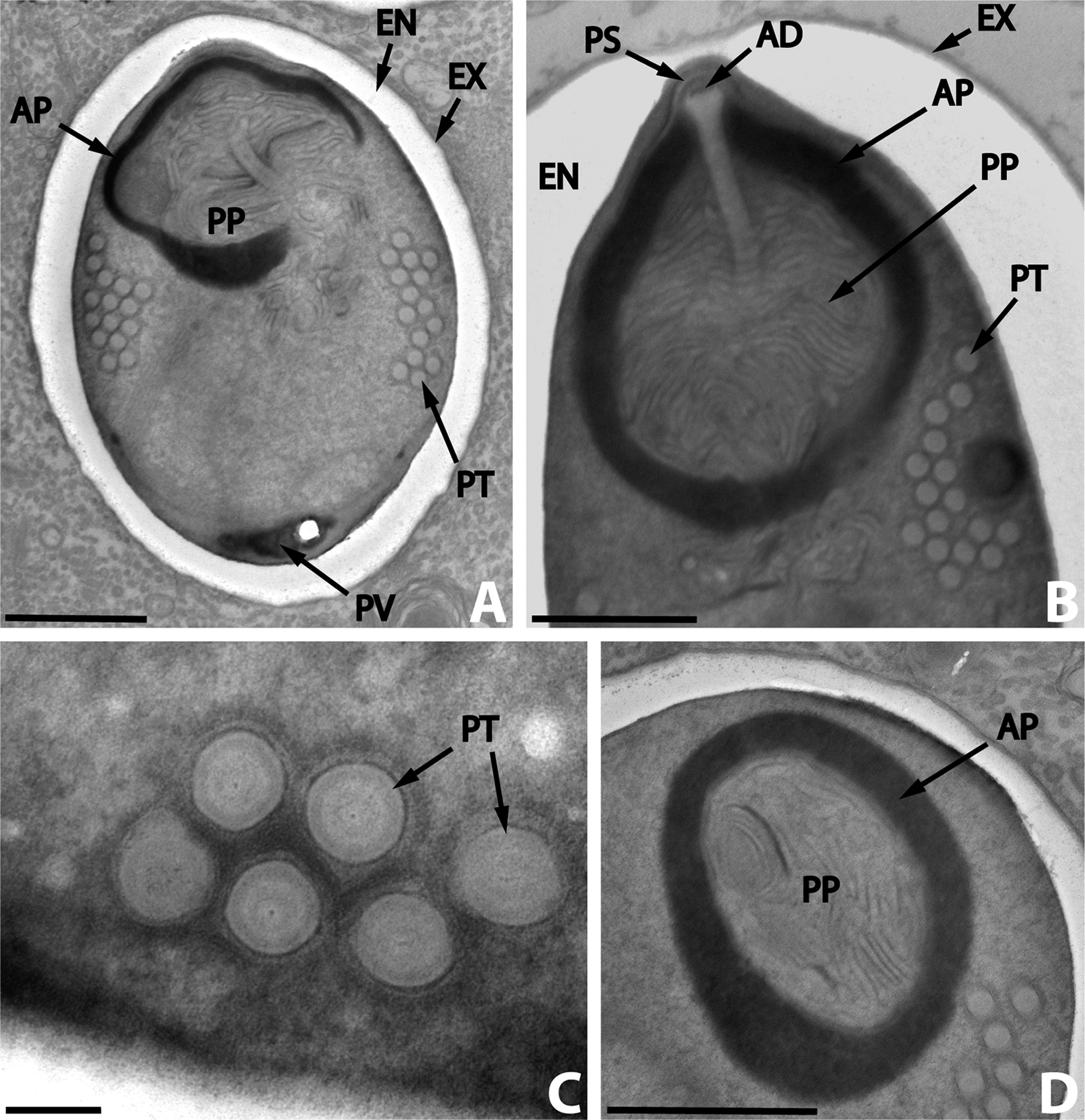
A hyperparasitic microsporidian, Nosema podocotyloidis, a parasite of a digenean which is itself a parasite of a fish.

Microsporidia can infect a variety of hosts, including hosts which are themselves parasites. In that case, the microsporidian species is a hyperparasite, i.e. a parasite of a parasite. As an example, more than eighteen species are known which parasitize digeneans (parasitic flatworms). These digeneans are themselves parasites in various vertebrates and molluscs. Eight of these species belong to the genus Nosema. Similarly, the microsporidian species Toguebayea baccigeri is a parasite of a digenean, the faustulid Bacciger israelensis, itself an intestinal parasite of a marine fish, the bogue Boops boops (Teleostei, Sparidae).

== Genomes ==
Microsporidia have the smallest known (nuclear) eukaryotic genomes. The parasitic lifestyle of microsporidia has led to a loss of many mitochondrial and Golgi genes, and even their ribosomal RNAs are reduced in size compared with those of most eukaryotes. As a consequence, the genomes of microsporidia are much smaller than those of other eukaryotes. Currently known microsporidial genomes are 2.5 to 11.6 Mb in size, encoding from 1,848 to 3,266 proteins which is in the same range as many bacteria.

Genomic and epigenetic architecture vary significantly across different species in Microsporidia. Some variable characteristics are nucleotidic composition, gene location in the chromosome or methylation levels in coding regions. Ribosomal RNA genes are located in the subtelomeric chromosomal regions in species like Encephalitozoon, while other species have radically different architectures. Hipermethylation in ribosomal RNA is highly preserved, regardless of its position in the genome. Guanine and cytosine content is negatively associated to genome size. Therefore, larger genomes will have a smaller proportion of guanine and cytosine.

Horizontal gene transfer (HGT) seems to have occurred many times in microsporidia. For instance, the genomes of Encephalitozoon romaleae and Trachipleistophora hominis contain genes that derive from animals and bacteria, and some even from fungi.

== DNA repair ==
The Rad9-Rad1-Hus1 protein complex (also known as the 9-1-1 complex) in eukaryotes is recruited to sites of DNA damage where it is considered to help trigger the checkpoint-signaling cascade. Genes that code for heterotrimeric 9-1-1 are present in microsporidia. In addition to the 9-1-1 complex, other components of the DNA repair machinery are also present indicting that repair of DNA damage likely occurs in microsporidia.

== Phylogeny ==
Phylogeny of Rozellomycota. Backbone from SSU rRNA in Wijayawardene et al. (2020); Mitosporidium, Morellospora, and Microsporidia s.l. from SSU rRNA in Corsaro et al. (2020); internals of Microsporidia s.s. from SSU rRNA in Bojko et al. (2022).

- Rozellomyceta
  - Rozella
  - Microsporidiomycota (Note: Treatment not accepted by the 2020, 2022, or 2024 Outlines, which treat this node as having no taxonomic value, and puts all of Rozellomyceta under Rozellomycta.)
    - - - Mitosporidium
        - Morellospora
    - - Paramicrosporidium
      - - Nucleophaga
        - Microsporidia s.l.
          - - Chytridiopsidea
              Chytridiopsida
          - - Metchnikovellea
              Metchnikovellida
            - Microsporidea Microsporidia s.s.
              - Neopereziida
              - - Ovavesiculida
                - - Amblyosporida
                  - - - Glugeida
                      - "Orphan lineage"
                    - - Nosematida
                      - Enterocytozoonida

Node 1: The "Orphan lineage" includes Hamiltosporidium + Astathelohania. Neofabelliforma and Areospora are possible inclusions but support is weak.

Note 2: The presence of Enterocytozoonida (Mrazekiidae + Enterocytozoonidae) indicates a "splitter" view of Nosematida in Bojko et al. (2022). In the 2024 Outline, the two families are subsumed into Nosematida.

Note 3: Amblyosporida has also been split into Caudosporida (Caudosporidae) and a smaller Amblyosporida (Amblyosporidae + Gurleyidae). This is used with some doubt in Bojko et al. (2022). The Outline takes a lumper view.

Note 4: Microsporida s.s. is the "classical" scope of the class used by the Outline and Bojko et al. (2022). Some authors such as Corsaro et al. (2020) defines a larger scope, noted as Microsporida s.l. here.

=== Alternative topologies ===
Bojko et al. (2022) also includes a different branching order recovered by both Cormier et al. (2021) and Wadi and Reinke (2020), using a phylogenomic (multilocus) approach with 68 single-copy genes. This branching order indicates:

- Metchnikovellea
  Metchnikovellida
- Microsporidea Microsporidia s.s.
  - Ovavesiculida
  - - Glugeida
    - - - Amblyosporida
        - "Orphan lineage"
      - - Neopereziida
        - - Nosematida
          - Enterocytozoonida

South et al. (2024), quoting Corsano (2022), gives the following alternative topology for Microsporidia s.l.:

- Paramicrosporidium
- Microsporidia s.l.
  - Microsporidia s.s.
  - - Nucleophaga
    - - Chytridiopsida
      - Metchnikovellea

South et al. (2024) marks the above internal topology of Microsporidia s.l. as robust to newer genome-based (multiprotein) studies, namely de Albuquerque & Haag, 2023; Thomé et al., 2023; Williams et al., 2022.

== Classification ==
The first described microsporidian genus, Nosema, was initially put by Nägeli in the fungal group Schizomycetes together with some bacteria and yeasts. For some time microsporidia were considered as very primitive eukaryotes, placed in the protozoan group Cnidospora. Later, especially because of the lack of mitochondria, they were placed along with the other Protozoa such as diplomonads, parabasalids and archamoebae in the protozoan-group Archezoa. More recent research has falsified this theory of early origin (for all of these). Instead, microsporidia are proposed to be highly developed and specialized organisms, which just dispensed functions that are needed no longer, because they are supplied by the host. Furthermore, spore-forming organisms in general do have a complex system of reproduction, both sexual and asexual, which look far from primitive.

Since the mid-2000s microsporidia are placed within the Fungi or as a sister-group of the Fungi with a common ancestor. To avoid destructive changes to lower classification, the International Code of Nomenclature for algae, fungi, and plants explicitly excludes Microsporidia since 2012, leaving it to the International Code of Zoological Nomenclature as is traditionally done.

Early work to identify clades is largely based on habitat and host. Three classes of Microsporidia are proposed by Vossbrinck and Debrunner-Vossbrinck in 2005, based on the habitat: Aquasporidia, Marinosporidia and Terresporidia.

A second classification by Cavalier-Smith 1993:

- Subphyla Rudimicrospora Cavalier-Smith 1993
  - Class Minisporea Cavalier-Smith 1993
    - Order Minisporida Sprague, 1972
  - Class Metchnikovellea Weiser, 1977
    - Order Metchnikovellida Vivier, 1975
- Subphyla Polaroplasta Cavalier-Smith 1993
  - Class Pleistophoridea Cavalier-Smith 1993
    - Order Pleistophorida Stempell 1906
  - Class Disporea Cavalier-Smith 1993
    - Subclass Unikaryotia Cavalier-Smith 1993
    - Subclass Diplokaryotia Cavalier-Smith 1993

Alimov 2007	Wijayawardene et al. 2024
Class Metchnikovellea; Order Metchnikovellida; Family Amphiacanthidae; Family Metchnikovellidae; Class Microsporea; Family Cougourdellidae; Family Facilisporidae; Family Heterovesiculidae; Family Myosporidae; Family Nadelsporidae; Family Neonosemoidiidae; Family Ordosporidae; Family Pseudonosematidae; Family Telomyxidae; Family Toxoglugeidae; Family Tubulinosematidae; Subclass Haplophasea; Order Chytridiopsida; Family Chytridiopsidae; Family Buxtehudeidae; Family Enterocytozoonidae; Family Burkeidae; Family Hesseidae; Order Glugeida; Family Glugeidae; Family Gurleyidae; Family Encephalitozoonidae; Family Abelsporidae; Family Tuzetiidae; Family Microfilidae; Family Unikaryonidae; Subclass Dihaplophasea; Order Meiodihaplophasida; Superfamily Thelohanioidea; Family Thelohaniidae; Family Duboscqiidae; Family Janacekiidae; Family Pereziidae; Family Striatosporidae; Family Cylindrosporidae; Superfamily Burenelloidea; Family Burenellidae; Superfamily Amblyosporoidea; Family Amblyosporidae; Order Dissociodihaplophasida; Superfamily Nosematoidea; Family Nosematidae; Family Ichthyosporidiidae; Family Caudosporidae; Family Pseudopleistophoridae; Family Mrazekiidae; Superfamily Culicosporoidea; Family Culicosporidae; Family Culicosporellidae; Family Golbergiidae; Family Spragueidae; Superfamily Ovavesiculoidea; Family Ovavesiculidae; Family Tetramicridae	Class Chytridiopsidea Issi 1980 – Moved out; see Rozellomycota; Class Rudimicrosporia Sprague – Moved out; see Rozellomycota; Class Microsporidea Delphy 1936 ex Levine & Corliss 1963; Family Abelsporidae Azevedo 1987; Family Areosporidae Stentiford et al. 2014; Family Burenellidae Jouvenaz & Hazard 1978; Family Burkeidae Sprague 1977; Family Cougourdellidae Poisson 1953; Family Cylindrosporidae Issi & Voronin 1986; Family Duboscqiidae Sprague 1977; Family Golbergiidae Issi 1986; Family Microfilidae Sprague, Becnel & Hazard 1992; Family Neonosemoidiidae Faye, Toguebaye & Bouix 1996; Family Pleistosporidiidae Codreanu-Balcesci & Codreanu 1982; Family Pseudopleistophoridae Sprague 1977; Family Striatosporidae Issi & Voronin 1986; Family Telomyxidae Leger & Hesse 1910; Family Toxoglugeidae Voronin 1993; Family Tuzetiidae Sprague, Tuzet & Maurand 1977; Order Amblyosporida Tokarev & Issi 2020; Family Amblyosporidae Weiser 1977 [Culicosporidae; Culicosporellidae]; Family Caudosporidae Weiser 1958 [Flabelliformidae]; Family Gurleyidae Sprague 1977; Order Neopereziida Tokarev & Issi 2020; Family Janacekiidae Issi et al. 1990; Family Berwaldiidae Simakova, Tokarev & Issi 2018a [Fibrillasporidae]; Family Neopereziidae Voronin 1999 [Pseudonosematidae]; Family Tubulinosematidae Franzen et al. 2005; Order Ovavesiculida Tokarev & Issi 2020; Family Ovavesiculidae Sprague, Becnel & Hazard 1992; Order Glugeida Issi 1986; Family Facilisporidae Jones, Prosperi-Porta & Kim 2012; Family Glugeidae Thélohan 1892 [Ichthyosporidiidae]; Family Myosporidae Stentiford et al. 2010; Family Pereziidae Loubes et al. 1977 [Nadelsporidae]; Family Pleistophoridae Doflein 1901; Family Spragueidae Weissenberg 1976 [Tetramicridae]; Family Thelohaniidae Hazard & Oldacre 1975 [Coccosporidae]; Family Unikaryonidae Sprague 1977; Order Nosematida Labbé 1899; Family Encephalitozoonidae Voronin 1989; Family Enterocytozoonidae Cali & Owen 1990; Family Heterovesiculidae Lange et al. 1995; Family Mrazekiidae Léger & Hesse 1922 [Rectisporidae]; Family Nosematidae Labbe 1899; Family Ordosporidae Larsson, Ebert & Vávra 1997

Corsaro 2022 adds (not accepted by Index Fungorum or 2024 Outline):

- Order Paramicrosporidiales Corsaro 2022
  - Family Paramicrosporidiaceae Corsaro 2022
- Order Morellosporales Corsaro 2022
  - Family Mitosporidiaceae Corsaro 2022
  - Family Morellosporaceae Corsaro 2022
- Order Nucleophagales Corsaro 2022
  - Family Nucleophagaceae Corsaro 2022

In addition, there is the historical genus Microsporidium for holding species not otherwise classified.

== See also ==
- List of Microsporidian genera
- Glugea, a genus of microsporidia
- Nosema apis, a microsporidian parasite of bees
