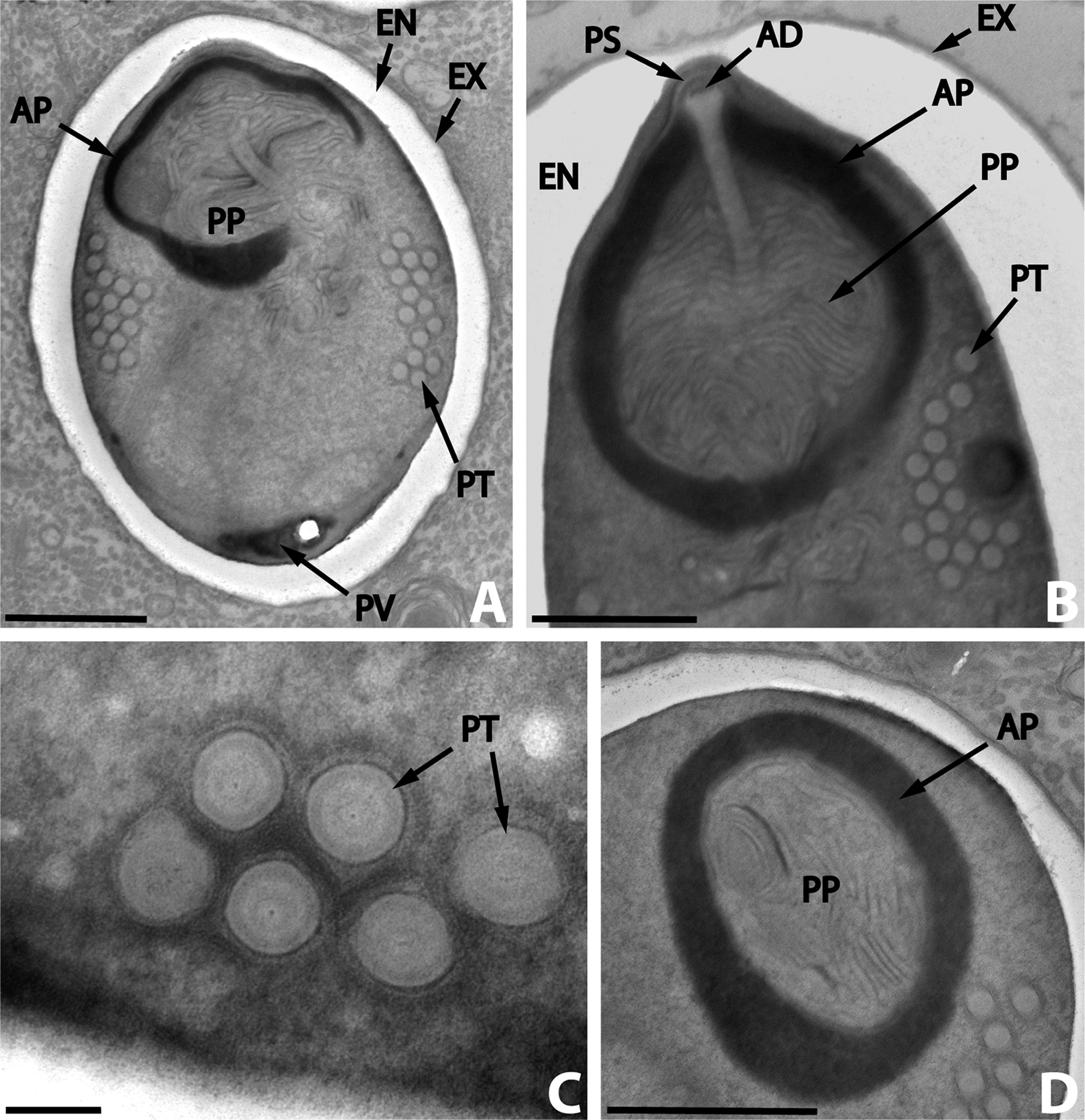
- Nosema podocotyloidis

Scientific classification
- Kingdom: Fungi
- Division: Rozellomycota
- Class: Microsporidia
- Family: Nosematidae
- Genus: Nosema; Nägeli (1857)

= Nosema (microsporidian) =

Genus of parasitic fungi

Nosema is a genus of microsporidian parasites. The genus, circumscribed by Swiss botanist Carl Nägeli in 1857, contains 81 species. Most parasitise insects and other arthropods, and the best-known Nosema species parasitise honeybees, where they are considered a significant disease by beekeepers, often causing a colony to fail to thrive in the spring as they come out of their overwintering period. Eight species parasitize digeneans, a group of parasitic flatworms, and thus are hyperparasites, i.e., parasites of a parasite.

== Species ==
- Nosema algerae parasitising mosquitoes
- Nosema antheraeae parasitising the Chinese oak silkworm Antheraea pernyi
- Nosema apis parasitising western honey bees
- Nosema birgii parasitising the chrysomelid beetle Mesoplatys cincta
- Nosema bombi parasitising bumble bees
- Nosema bombycis causes pébrine in silkworms
- Nosema carpocapsae parasitising Laspeyresia molesta (a tortricid moth)
- Nosema ceranae parasitising honey bees and bumble bees
- Nosema chaetocnemae parasitising the chrysomelid beetle Chaetocnema tibialis
- Nosema chrysorrhoeae parasitising the browntail moth Euproctis chrysorrhoea (a lymantrid moth)
- Nosema couilloudi parasitising chrysomelid beetles of genus Nisotra
- Nosema empoascae parasitising the potato leaf-hopper Empoasca fabae (a cicadellid bug)
- Nosema equestris parasitising the chrysomelid beetles Gastrophysa viridula and Leptinotarsa decemlineata
- Nosema fumiferanae parasitising the eastern spruce budworm Choristoneura fumiferana (a tortricid moth)
- Nosema furnacalis parasitising the Asian corn-borer Ostrinia furnacalis (a pyralid moth)
- Nosema galerucellae parasitising the chrysomelid beetle Galerucella luteola
- Nosema gastroideae parasitising the chrysomelid beetle Gastrophysa polygoni
- Nosema granulosis parasitising the crustacean Gammarus duebeni
- Nosema kovacevici
- Nosema leptinotarsae parasitising the Colorado potato beetle (Leptinotarsa decemlineata)
- Nosema nisotrae parasitising chrysomelid beetles of genus Nisotra
- Nosema oulemae parasitising the chrysomelid beetle Oulema melanopus
- Nosema phyllotretae parasitising the chrysomelid beetles Phyllotreta atra and Phyllotreta undulata
- Nosema polygrammae parasitising the chrysomelid beetle Polygramma undecimlineata
- Nosema portugal parasitising the gypsy moth Lymantria dispar (a lymantrid moth)
- Nosema pyrrhocoridis parasitising the red soldier bug Pyrrhocoris apterus (a pyrrhocorid bug)
- Nosema pyrausta parasitising the European corn-borer Ostrinia nubilalis (a pyralid moth)
- Nosema serbica parasitising the gypsy moth Lymantria dispar (a lymantrid moth)
- Nosema spodopterae parasitising the diamondback moth, Plutella xylostella (a plutellid moth)
- Nosema trichoplusiae parasitising the cabbage looper/tiger moth Trichoplusia ni (a noctuid moth)
- Nosema tyriae parasitising the cinnabar moth Tyria jacobaeae (an arctiid moth)
- Nosema vespula parasitising European wasps

Nosema locustae, which parasitises locusts and grasshoppers, and Nosema grylli, which parasitises crickets, have been transferred to Paranosema, or in the former case Antonospora. Nosema algerae, which parasitises anopheline mosquitoes, has been transferred to Brachiola. Nosema kingii, which parasitises fruit flies, and Nosema acridophagus, which parasitises grasshoppers, have been transferred to Tubilinosema.

Studies of DNA sequences imply that the boundaries between the genera Nosema and Vairimorpha are incorrectly drawn.
