= History of silk =

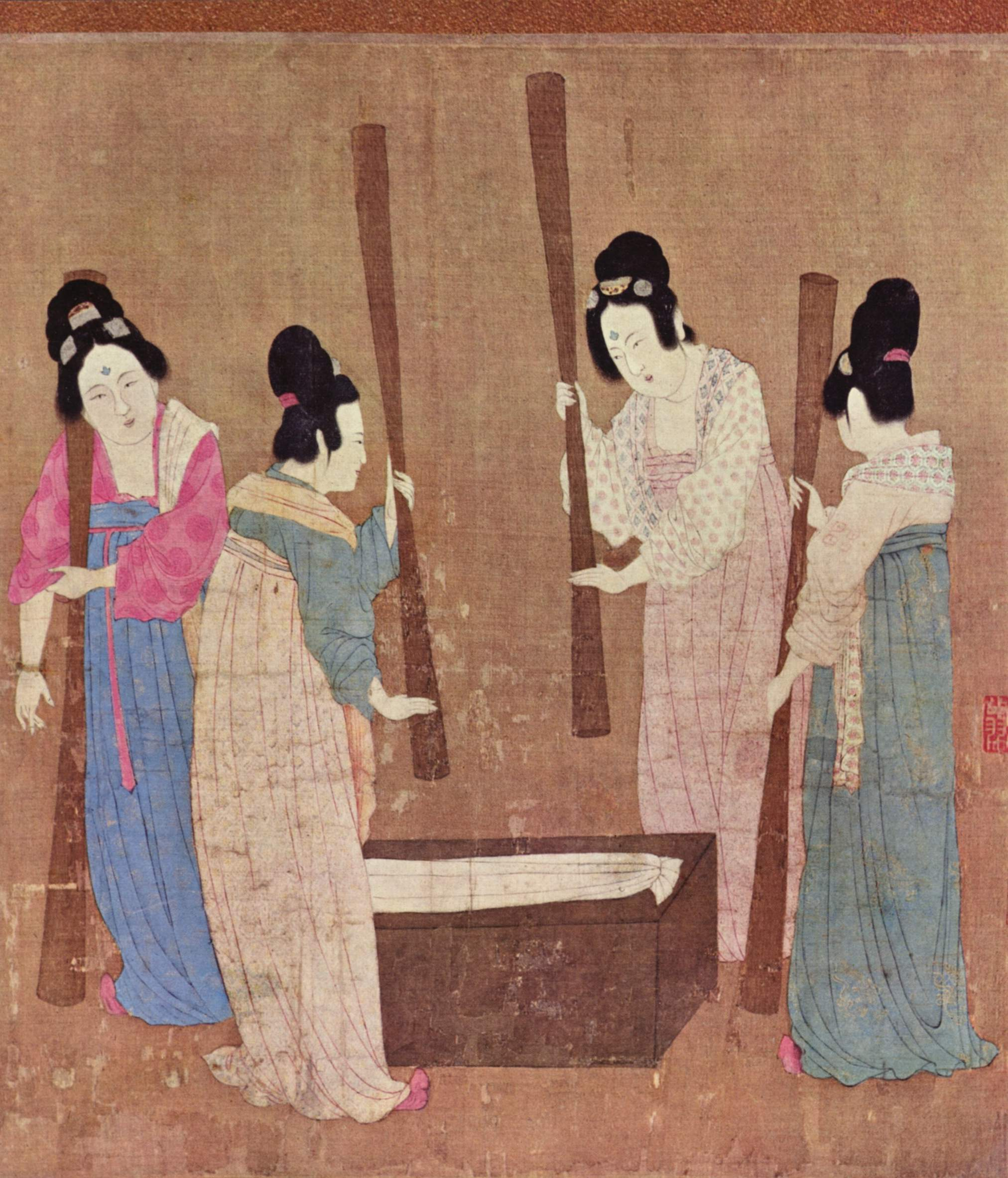
Court Ladies Preparing Newly Woven Silk, a Chinese silk painting by Emperor Huizong of Song, early 12th century.

The production of silk originated in Neolithic China within the Yangshao culture (4th millennium BCE). Though it would later reach other places in the world, the art of silk production remained confined to China until the Silk Road opened at 114 BC. Even after trade opened, China maintained a virtual monopoly over silk production for another thousand years. The use of silk within China was not confined to clothing alone, and silk was used for a number of applications, such as writing. Within clothing, the color of silk worn also held social importance, and formed an important guide of social class during the Tang dynasty of China.

Silk cultivation had reached Japan by 300 AD, and by 552 AD the Byzantine Empire managed to obtain silkworm eggs and were able to begin silkworm cultivation while the Arabs also started to manufacture silk at around the same time. As a result of the spread of sericulture, Chinese silk exports became less important, although they still maintained dominance over the luxury silk market. The Crusades brought silk production to Western Europe, in particular to many Italian states, which saw an economic boom exporting silk to the rest of Europe. Developments in the manufacturing technique also started to take place during the Middle Ages (5th to 15th centuries) in Europe, with devices such as the spinning wheel first appearing at this time. During the 16th century, France joined Italy in developing a successful silk trade, although the efforts of most other nations to develop a silk industry of their own were unsuccessful.

The Industrial Revolution changed much of Europe's silk industry. Due to innovations in the spinning of cotton, cotton became much cheaper to manufacture, leading to cotton production becoming the main focus for many manufacturers, and causing the more costly production of silk to shrink. New weaving technologies, however, increased the efficiency of producing silk cloth; among these was the Jacquard loom, developed for the production of highly detailed silks with embroidery-like designs. An epidemic of several silkworm diseases at this time caused production to fall, especially in France, where the industry never fully recovered.

In the 20th century, Japan and China regained their earlier dominant role in silk production, and China is now once again the world's largest producer of silk. The rise of new imitation silk fabrics, such as nylon and polyester, has reduced the prevalence of silk throughout the world, being cheaper and easier to care for. Silk is now once again thought of as a luxury good, with a greatly reduced importance compared to its historical heyday.

== Early history ==
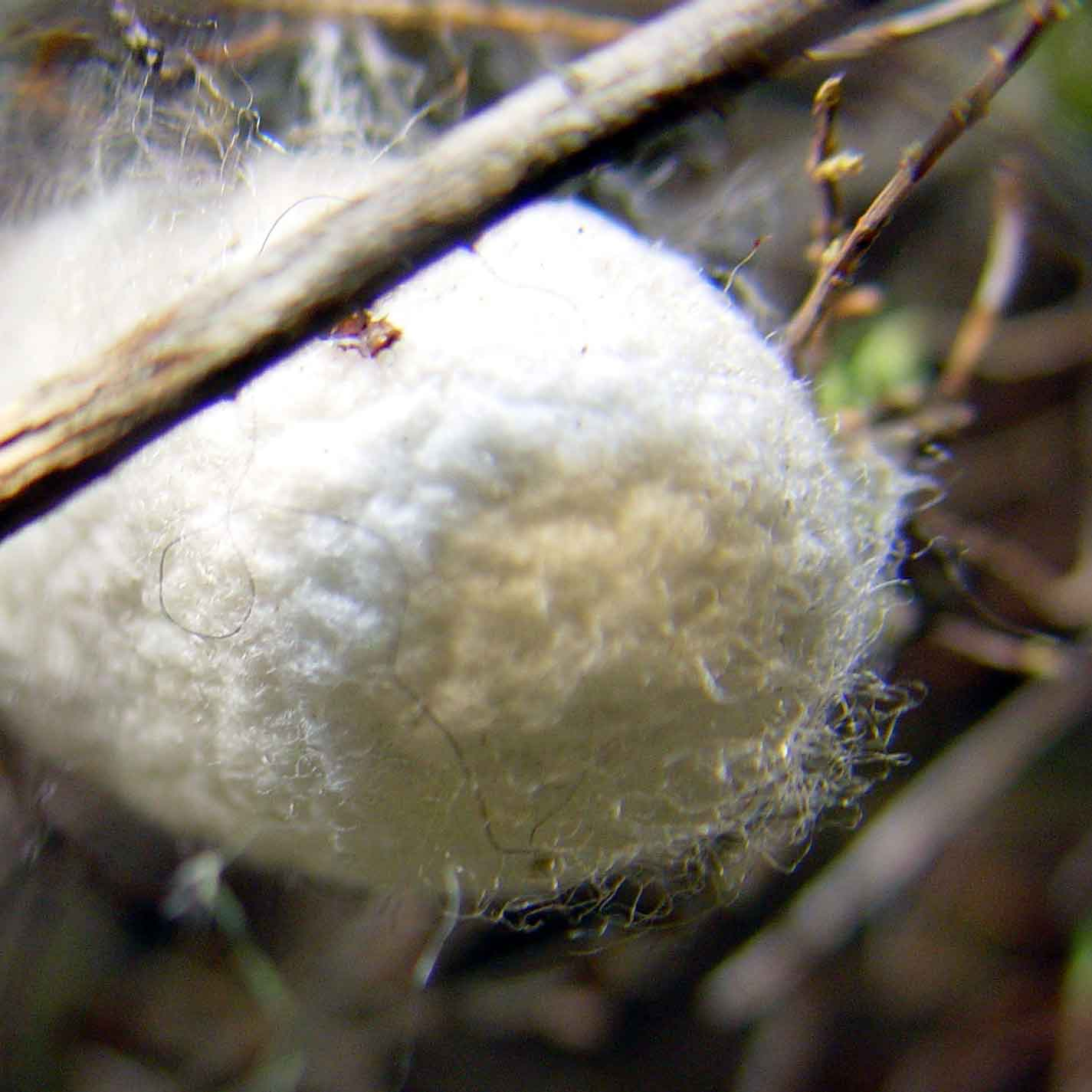
The cocoon of the domesticated silk moth; unlike wild silk moths, its cocoon is entirely white

=== First appearance of silk ===
The earliest evidence of silk dates back to more than 8,500 years ago (late 7th millennium BCE) and has been found at the early Neolithic Age tombs of Jiahu, China. Biomolecular evidence, reported from a study, showed the existence of prehistoric silk fibroin in the tombs. Rough weaving tools and bone needles were also excavated, indicating the possibility that the Jiahu residents may also have possessed basic weaving and sewing skills required for making textiles. Other evidence of silk include items found at sites of the Yangshao culture in Xia County, Shanxi, where a silk cocoon was found cut in half by a sharp knife, dating back to between 4000 and 3000 BC. The species was identified as Bombyx mori, the domesticated silkworm. Fragments of a primitive loom can also be seen from the sites of Hemudu culture in Yuyao, Zhejiang, dated to about 4000 BC.

The earliest extant example of a woven silk fabric is from 3630 BC, used as wrapping for the body of a child. The fabric comes from a Yangshao site in Qingtaicun at Rongyang, Henan. Similar remains of silk fabric were discovered at another Yangshao site located in Wanggou, Henan, in the year 2019. The fabric was used to wrap the body of a child placed inside a burial urn. Scraps of silk were found in a Liangzhu culture site at Qianshanyang in Huzhou, Zhejiang, dating back to 2700 BCE. Other fragments have been recovered from royal tombs in the Shang dynasty (c. 1600–1046 BCE).

During the later epoch, the knowledge of silk production was spread outside of China, with the Koreans, the Japanese and, later, the Indian people gaining knowledge of sericulture and silk fabric production. Although the exact origin is uncertain, ancient Chinese records such as the Book of Han and Records of the Three Kingdoms note that sericulture was already practiced in ancient Korea Gojoseon and Samhan. Allusions to the fabric in the Old Testament show that it was known in Western Asia in biblical times. Scholars believe that starting in the 2nd century BC, the Chinese established a commercial network aimed at exporting silk to the West. Silk was used, for example, by the Persian court and its king, Darius III, when Alexander the Great conquered the empire.

Even though silk spread rapidly across Eurasia, with the possible exception of Japan, its production remained exclusively Chinese for three millennia. The earliest examples of silk production outside China are from silk threads discovered from the Chanhudaro site in the Indus Valley civilisation, which are dated to 2450–2000 BC. The analysis of the silk fibres shows presence of reeling and sericulture, and predates another example of silk found in Nevasa in peninsular India, dated to 1500 BC.

The Siberian Ice Maiden, discovered in the Pazyryk burials, was found clad in a long crimson-and-white striped woolen skirt, with white felt stockings. Her yellow blouse was originally thought to be made of wild tussah silk, but closer examination of the fibres revealed the material not to be Chinese in origin, and was instead woven from a wild silk of a different origin, potentially India.

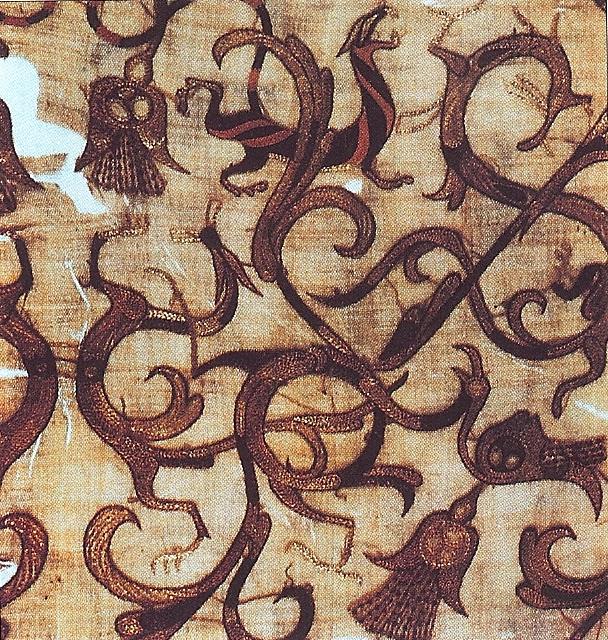
Detail of silk ritual garment from a 4th-century BC, Zhou dynasty, China

=== Myths and legends ===
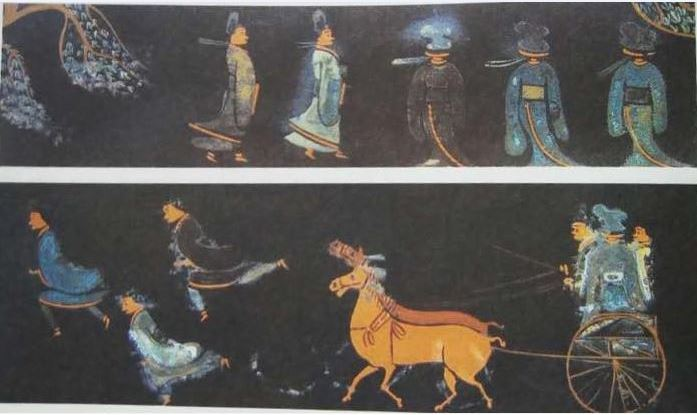
A lacquerware painting from the Jingmen Tomb (Chinese: 荊門楚墓; Pinyin: Jīngmén chǔ mù) of the State of Chu (704–223 BC), depicting men wearing traditional silk dress and riding in a two horsed chariot

Many myths and legends exist about origin of silk production. The writings of both Confucius and other Chinese traditions tell a story about Empress Leizu; one day, in about 3000 BC, a silk worm's cocoon fell into her teacup . Wishing to extract it from her drink, the 14-year-old girl began to unroll the thread of the cocoon. Seeing the long fibers that constituted the cocoon, the Empress gathered other cocoons and wove it into cloth. Having observed the life of the silkworm on the recommendation of her husband, the Yellow Emperor, she began to instruct her entourage in the art of raising silkworms - sericulture. From this point, the girl became the goddess of silk in Chinese mythology.

Knowledge of silk production eventually left China via the heir of a princess who was promised to a prince of Khotan, likely around the early 1st century AD. The princess, refusing to go without the fabric that she loved, decided to break the imperial ban on silkworm exportation.

Though silk was exported to foreign countries in great amounts, sericulture remained a secret that the Chinese carefully guarded; consequently, other cultures developed their own accounts and legends as to the source of the fabric. In classical antiquity, most Romans, great admirers of the cloth, were convinced that the Chinese took the fabric from tree leaves. This belief was affirmed by Seneca the Elder in his work Phaedra, and by Virgil in his work Georgics. Pliny the Elder notably accurately determined where silk came from; speaking of the Bombyx or silk moth, he wrote in his Natural History that, "They weave webs, like spiders, that become a luxurious clothing material for women, called silk."

== Silk usage in Ancient and Medieval China ==
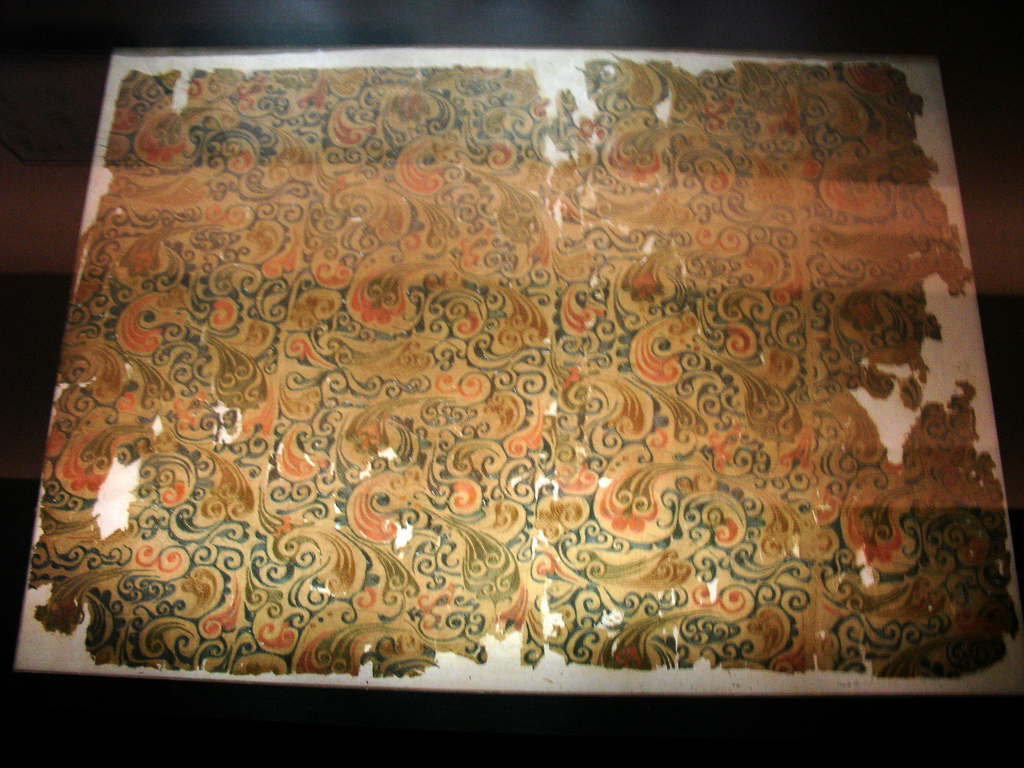
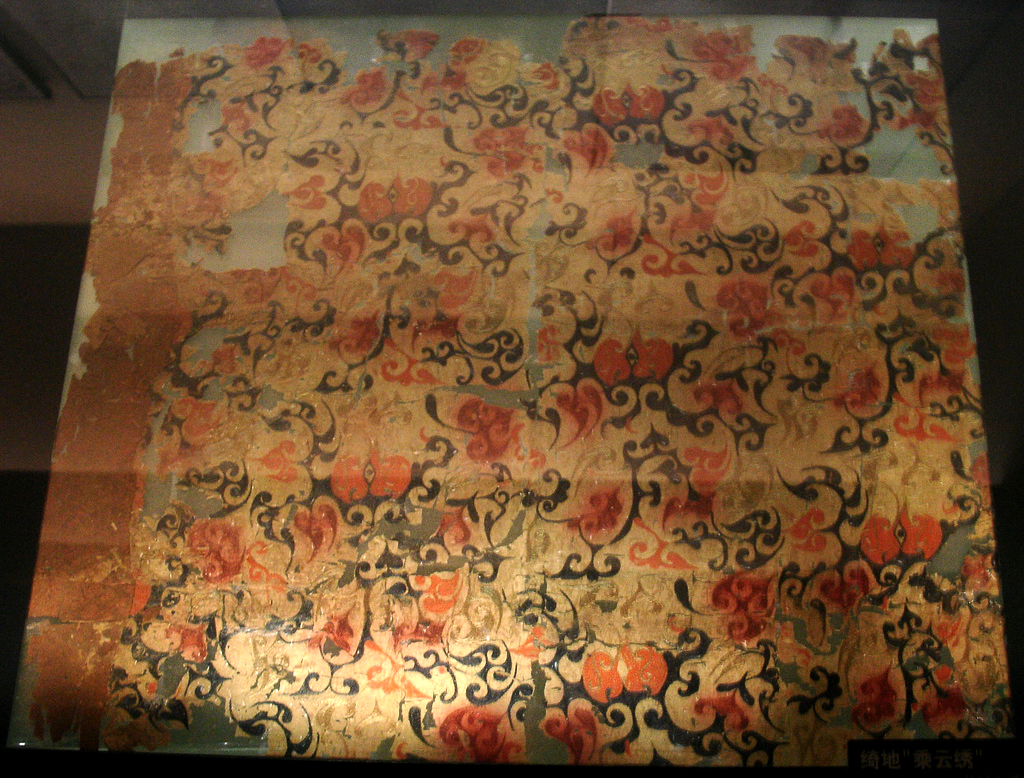
Woven silk textile from Tomb No. 1 at Mawangdui Han tombs site, Changsha, Hunan province, China, 2nd century BC, Western Han dynasty

In China, silkworm farming was originally restricted to women, and many women were employed in the silk-making industry. Even though some saw the development of a luxury product as useless, silk provoked such a craze among the high society that the rules in the Li Ji were used to limit its use to the members of the imperial family.

For approximately a millennium, the right to wear silk was reserved for the emperor and the highest dignitaries. Silk was, at the time, a sign of great wealth, due to its shimmering appearance, created by the silk fiber's prismatic structure, which refracted light from every angle. After some time, silk gradually extended to other classes of Chinese society, though this was mainly the uppermost noble classes. Silk began to be used for decorative means and also in less luxurious ways; musical instruments, fishing, and bow-making all utilized silk. Peasants, however, did not have the right to wear silk until the Qing dynasty (1644–1911).

Paper was one of the greatest discoveries of ancient China. Beginning in the 3rd century BC, paper was made in all sizes with various materials. Silk was no exception, and silk workers had been making paper since the 2nd century BC. Silk, bamboo, linen, wheat and rice straw were all used, and paper made with silk became the first type of luxury paper. Researchers have found an early example of writing done on silk paper in the tomb of a marchioness, who died around 168, in Mawangdui, Changsha, Hunan. The material was more expensive, but also more practical than bamboo slips. Treatises on many subjects, including meteorology, medicine, astrology, divinity, and even maps written on silk have been discovered.

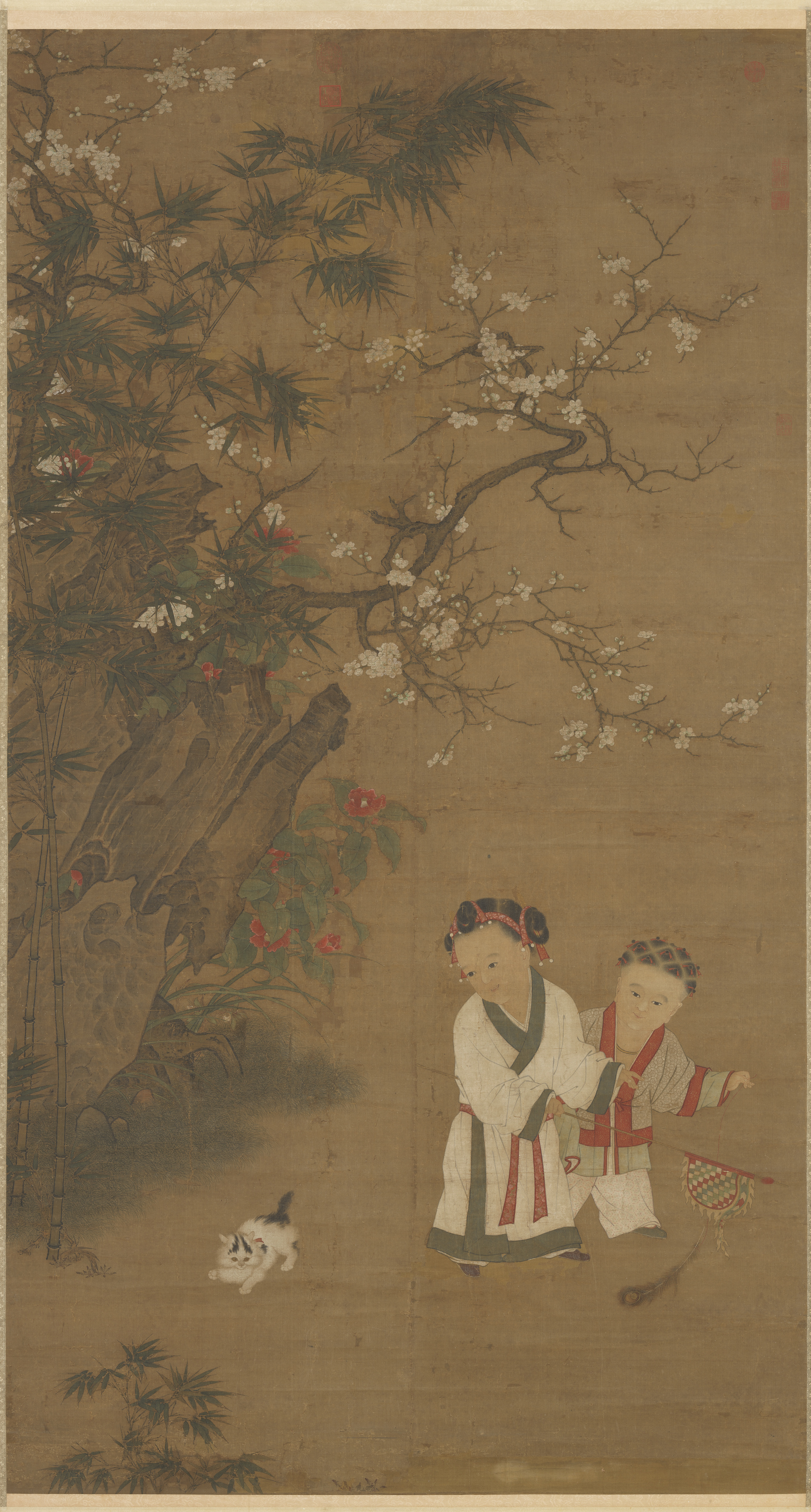
Chinese painting on silk, with playing children wearing silk clothes, by Su Hanchen (active 1130s–1160s), Song dynasty

During the Han dynasty, silk became progressively more valuable in its own right, and was used in a greater capacity than as simply a material; lengths of silk cloth were used to pay government officials and to compensate citizens who were particularly worthy. In the same manner that one would sometimes estimate the price of products according to a certain weight of gold, a length of silk cloth became a monetary standard in China, in addition to bronze coins. Many neighbouring countries began to grow envious of the wealth that sericulture provided China, and beginning in the 2nd century BC, the Xiongnu people regularly pillaged the provinces of the Han Chinese for around 250 years. Silk was a common offering by the emperor to these tribes in exchange for peace.

Silk is described in a chapter of the Fan Shengzhi shu from the Western Han period (206 BC–9 AD), and a surviving calendar for silk production in an Eastern Han (25–220 AD) document. The two other known works on silk from the Han period are lost.

The military payrolls tell us that soldiers were paid in bundles of plain silk textiles, which circulated as currency in Han times. Soldiers may well have traded their silk with the nomads who came to the gates of the Great Wall to sell horses and furs.

For more than a millennium, silk remained the principal diplomatic gift of the emperor of China to neighbouring countries or vassal states. The use of silk became so important that the character for silk (糸) soon constituted one of the principal radicals of Chinese script.

As a material for clothing and accessories, the use of silk was regulated by a very precise code in China. For example, the Tang dynasty and Song dynasty used colour symbolism to denote the various ranks of bureaucrats, according to their function in society, with certain colours of silk restricted to the upper classes only. Under the Ming dynasty, silk began to be used in a series of accessories: handkerchiefs, wallets, belts, or even as an embroidered piece of fabric displaying dozens of animals, real or mythical. These fashion accessories remained associated with a particular position: there was specific headgear for warriors, for judges, for nobles, and others for religious use. The women of high Chinese society also followed these codified practices, and used silk in their garments alongside the addition of countless decorative motifs. A 17th-century work, Jin Ping Mei, gives a description of one such motif:

Golden lotus having a quilted backgammon pattern, double-folded, adorned with savage geese pecking at a landscape of flowers and roses; the dress' right figure had a floral border with buttons in the form of bees or chrysanthemums.

Chinese silk making process

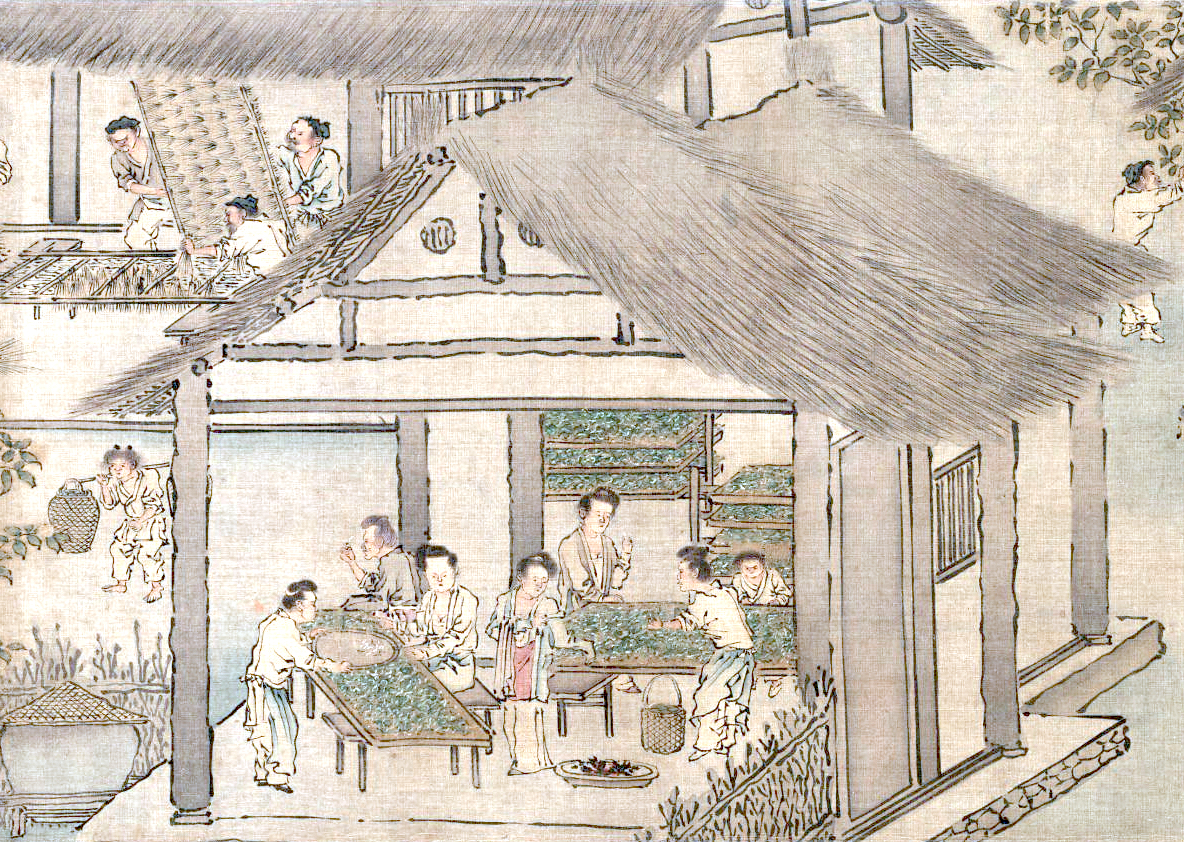
The silkworms and mulberry leaves are placed on trays.

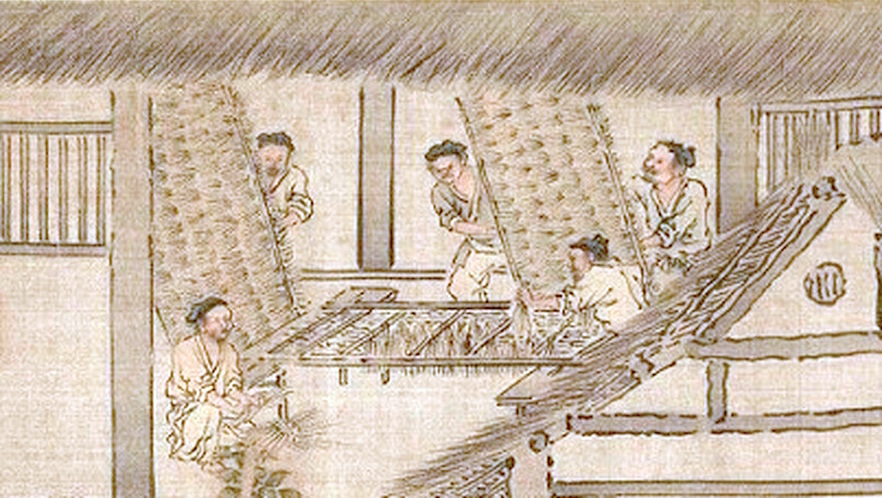
Twig frames for the silkworms are prepared.

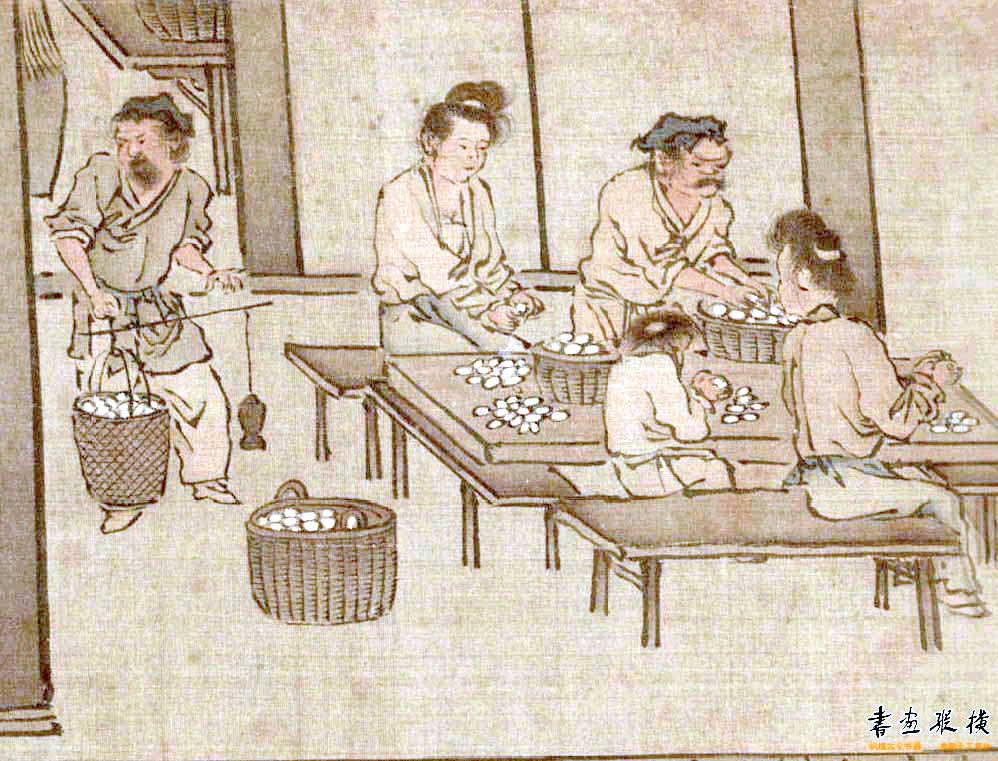
The cocoons are weighed.

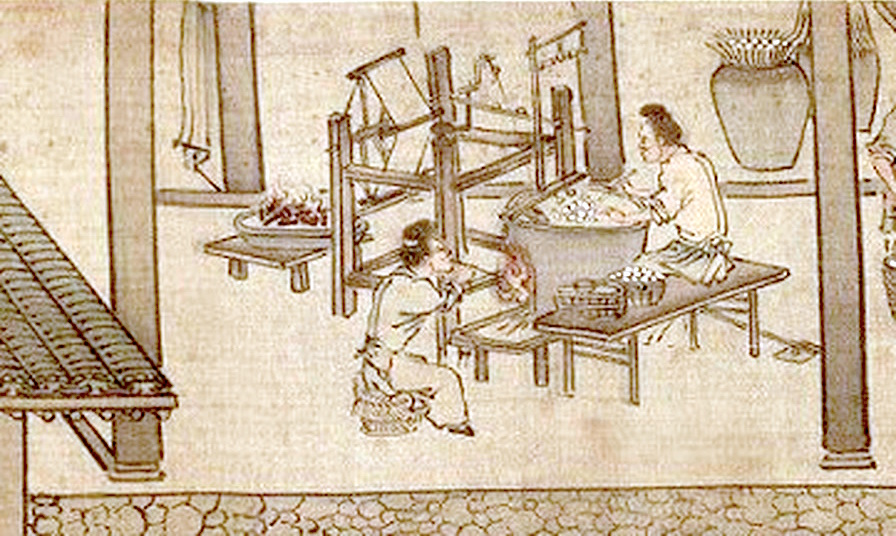
The cocoons are soaked and the silk is wound on spools.

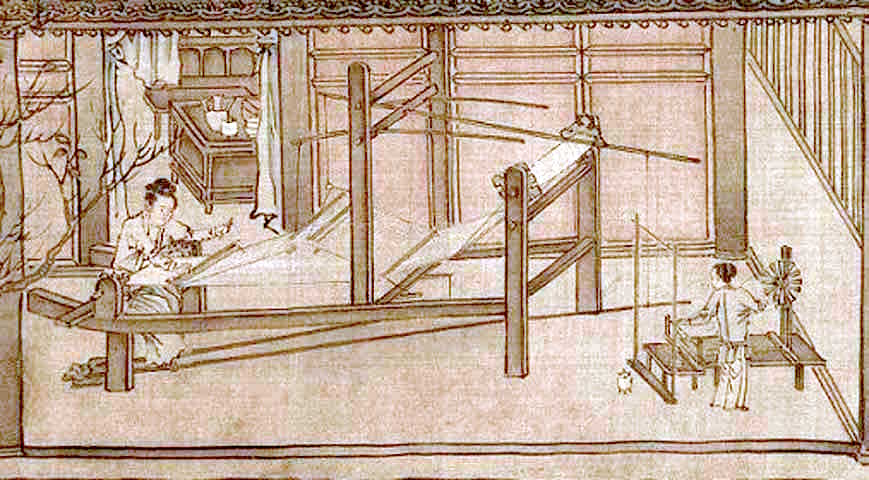
The silk is woven using a loom.

=== Silk moths and production techniques used in China ===
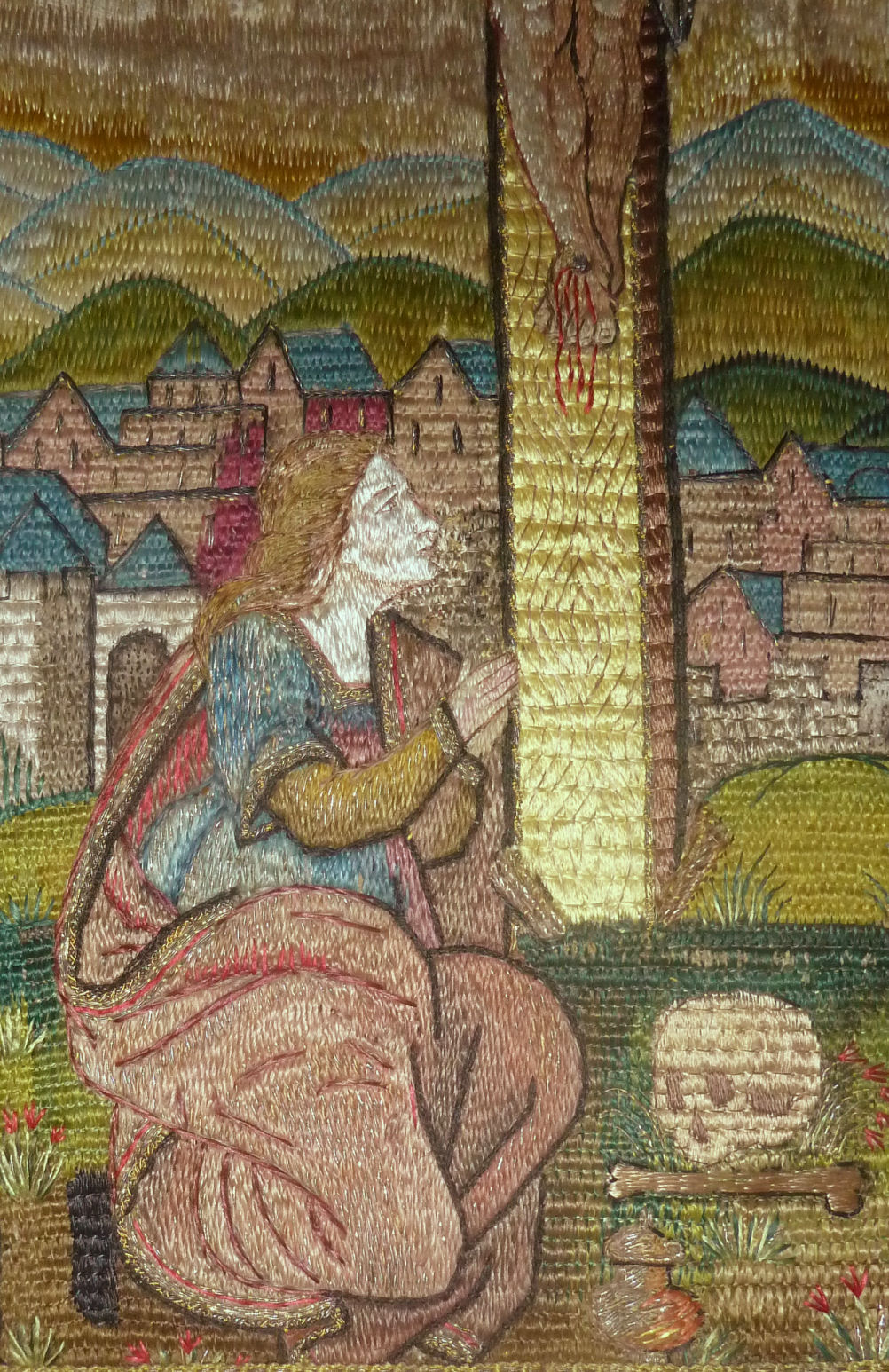
Polychrome embroidery in silk, 17th century, Antwerp

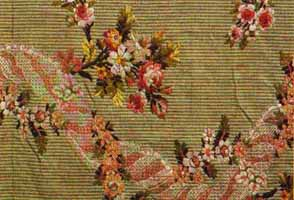
French silk brocade - Lyon 1760–1770

Silk was made using various breeds of lepidopterans, both wild and domestic. While wild silks were produced in many countries, the Chinese are considered to have been the first to produce silk fabric on a large scale, having the most efficient species of silk moth for silk production, the Bombyx mandarina, and its domesticated descendant, Bombyx mori. Chinese sources claim the existence in 1090 of a machine to unwind silkworm cocoons; the cocoons were placed in a large basin of hot water, the silk would leave the cauldron by tiny guiding rings, and would be wound onto a large spool, using a backward and forward motion. However, little information exists about the spinning techniques previously used in China. The spinning wheel, in all likelihood moved by hand, was known to exist by the beginning of the Christian era. The first accepted image of a spinning wheel appears in 1210, with an image of a silk spinning machine powered by a water wheel that dates to 1313.

More information is known about the looms used. The 'Nung Sang Chi Yao, or Fundamentals of Agriculture and Sericulture (compiled around 1210) is rich with pictures and descriptions, many pertaining to silk. It repeatedly claims the Chinese looms to be far superior to all others, and speaks of two types of loom that leave the worker's arms free: the drawloom, which is of Eurasian origin, and the pedal loom, which is attributed to East Asian origins. There are many diagrams of these that originate in the 12th and 13th centuries. When examined closely, many similarities between Eurasian machines can be drawn. Following the Jin dynasty (266–420), the existence of silk damasks was well recorded, and beginning in the 2nd century BC, four-shafted looms and other innovations allowed the creation of silk brocades.

== The Silk Road and trade (2nd–8th century) ==
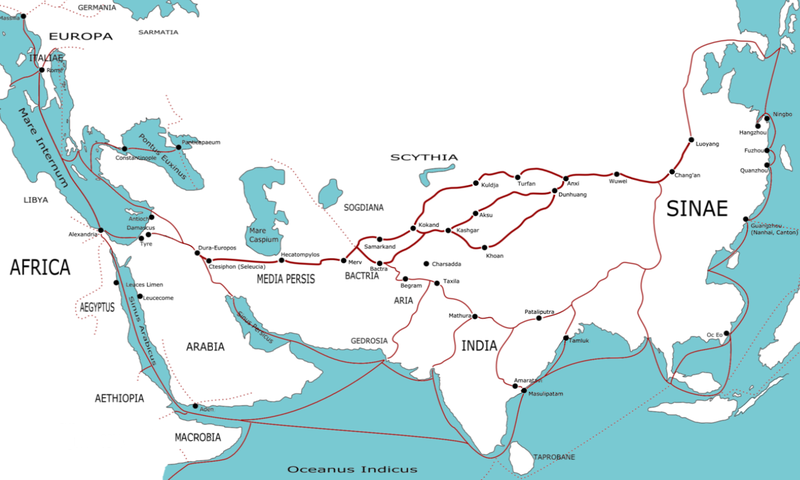
The main silk roads between 500 BC and 500 AD

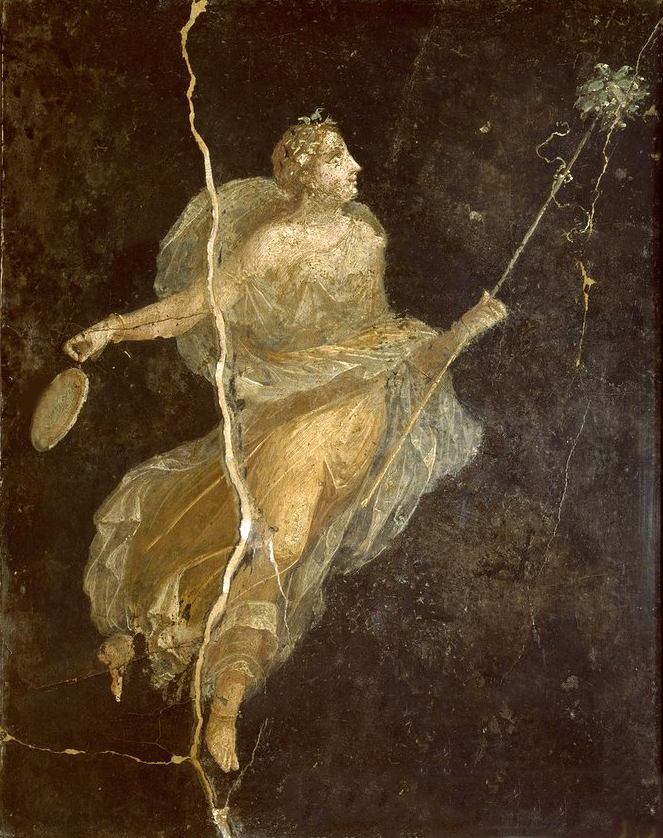
A Roman fresco from Pompeii showing a Maenad in silk dress, 1st century AD

Numerous archaeological discoveries show that silk had become a luxury material appreciated in foreign countries well before the opening of the Silk Road by the Chinese. For example, silk has been found in the Valley of the Kings in Egypt, in the tomb of a mummy dating to 1070 BC.

Both the Greeks and the Romans - the latter later than the former - spoke of the Seres, "people of silk", a term used for the inhabitants of Serica, their name for the far-off kingdom of China. According to certain historians, the first Roman contact with silk was that of the legions of the governor of Syria, Crassus. At the Battle of Carrhae, near the Euphrates, the legions were said to be so surprised by the brilliance of the banners of Parthia that they fled.

The Silk Road toward the west was opened by the Chinese in the 2nd century AD. The main road left from Xi'an, going either to the north or south of the Taklamakan desert, one of the most arid in the world, before crossing the Pamir Mountains. The caravans that travelled this route to exchange silk with other merchants were generally sizeable, constituting 100 to 500 people, as well as camels and yaks carrying around 140 kilograms (310 lb) of merchandise. The route linked to Antioch and the coasts of the Mediterranean, about one year's travel from Xi'an. In the south, a second route went by Yemen, Burma, and India before rejoining the northern route.

Not long after the conquest of Egypt in 30 BC, regular commerce began between the Romans and Asia, marked by the Roman appetite for silk cloth coming from the Far East, which was then resold to the Romans by the Parthians. The Roman Senate tried in vain to prohibit the wearing of silk, for economic reasons as well as moral ones. The import of Chinese silk resulted in vast amounts of gold leaving Rome, to such an extent that silk clothing was perceived as a sign of decadence and immorality.

I can see clothes of silk, if materials that do not hide the body, nor even one's decency, can be called clothes. ... Wretched flocks of maids labor so that the adulteress may be visible through her thin dress, so that her husband has no more acquaintance than any outsider or foreigner with his wife's body.

— Seneca the Younger, Declamations Vol. I.

China traded silk, teas, and porcelain, while India traded spices, ivory, textiles, precious stones, and pepper, and the Roman Empire exported gold, silver, fine glassware, wine, carpets, and jewels. Although the term "the Silk Road" implies a continuous journey, very few who traveled the route traversed it from end to end; for the most part, goods were transported by a series of agents on varying routes, and were traded in the bustling markets of the oasis towns. The main traders during Antiquity were the Indian and Bactrian traders, followed by Sogdian traders from the 5th to the 8th century AD, and then followed by Arab and Persian traders.

In the late Middle Ages, transcontinental trade over the land routes of the Silk Road declined as sea trade increased. Centuries went by, civilizations, and dynasties were formed, prospered, or perished, but the route that linked the continents of Europe and Asia survived and expanded, becoming known as the Silk Road. The Silk Road was a significant factor in the development of the civilizations of China, India, Ancient Egypt, Persia, Arabia, and Ancient Rome. Though silk was certainly the major trade item from China, many other goods were traded, and various technologies, religions and philosophies, as well as the bubonic plague (the "Black Death"), also traveled along the silk routes. Some of the other goods traded included luxuries such as silk, satin, hemp and other fine fabrics, musk, other perfumes, spices, medicines, jewels, glassware, and even rhubarb, as well as slaves.

== Global spread of sericulture (4th–16th century) ==
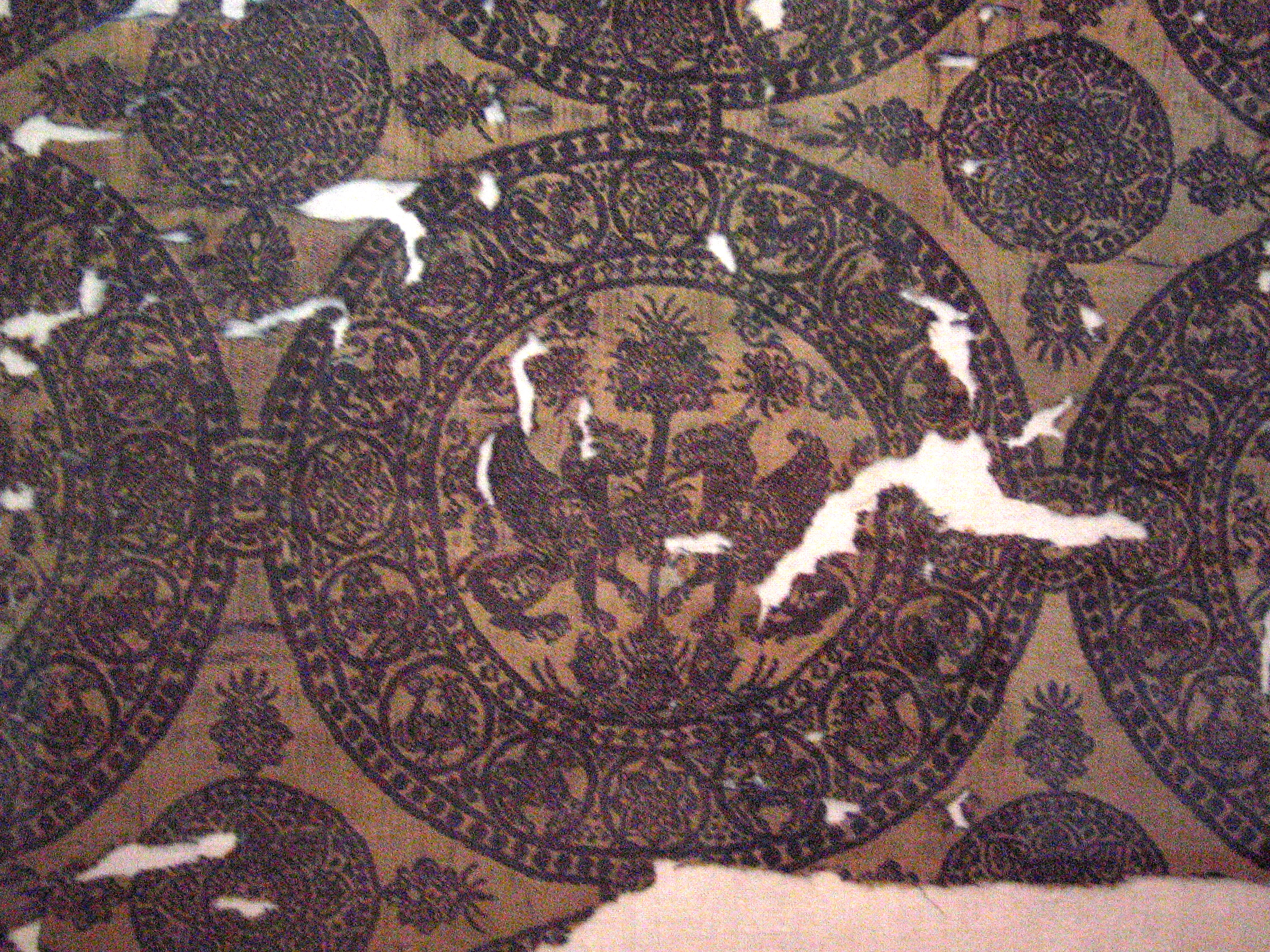
Sassanid inspired two-sided silk cloth, with winged lions and tree of life, from the early Islamic period in Iran, National Museum of Iran.

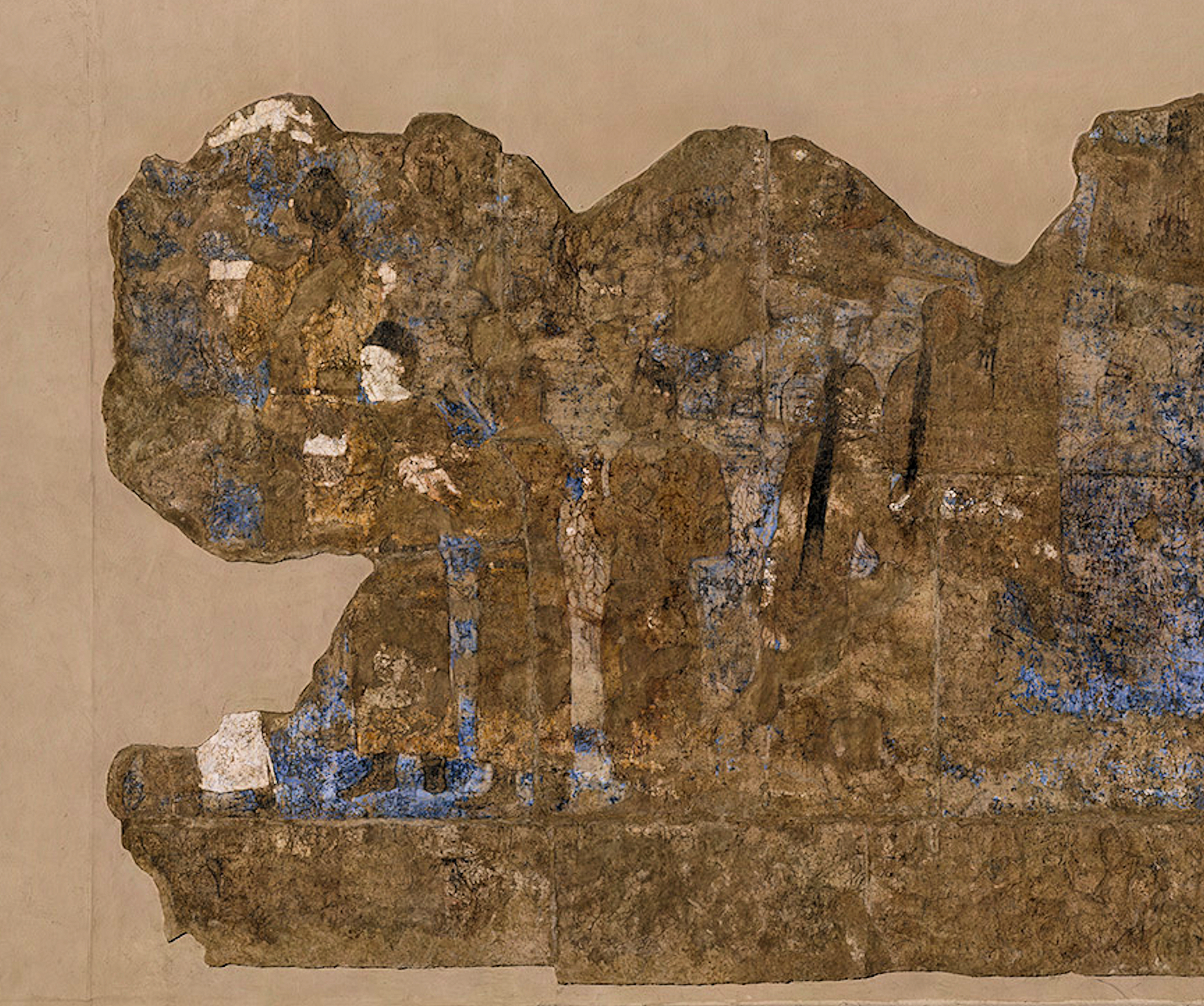
Chinese Embassy, carrying silk and a string of silkworm cocoons, 7th century CE, Afrasiyab, Sogdia.

Although silk was well known in Europe and most of Asia, China was able to keep a near-monopoly on silk production for several centuries, defended by an imperial decree and condemning to death anyone attempting to export silkworms or their eggs. According to the Nihongi, sericulture reached Japan for the first time around 300 AD, following a number of international students, having been sent from Japan to China, recruiting four young Chinese girls to teach the art of plain and figured weaving in Japan. Techniques of sericulture were subsequently introduced to Japan on a larger scale by frequent diplomatic exchanges between the 8th and 9th centuries.

Starting in the 4th century BC, silk began to reach the Hellenistic world by merchants who would exchange it for gold, ivory, horses or precious stones. Up to the frontiers of the Roman Empire, silk became a monetary standard for estimating the value of different products. Hellenistic Greece appreciated the high quality of the Chinese goods and made efforts to plant mulberry trees and breed silkworms in the Mediterranean basin, while Sassanid Persia controlled the trade of silk destined for Europe and Byzantium. The Greek word for "silken" was σηρικός, from Seres (Σῆρες), the name of the people from whom silk was first obtained, according to Strabo. The Greek word gave rise to the Latin 'sericum', and ultimately the Old English 'sioloc', which later developed into the Middle English 'silk'.

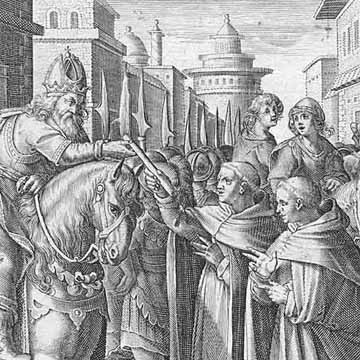
The monks sent by Justinian give the silkworms to the emperor.

According to a story by Procopius, it was not until 552 AD that the Byzantine emperor Justinian obtained the first silkworm eggs. He had sent two Nestorian monks to Central Asia, and they were able to smuggle silkworm eggs to him hidden in rods of bamboo. While under the monks' care, the eggs hatched, though they did not cocoon before arrival. The church manufacture in the Byzantine Empire was thus able to make fabrics for the emperor, with the intention of developing a large silk industry in the Eastern Roman Empire, using techniques learned from the Sassanids. These gynecia had a legal monopoly on the fabric, but the empire continued to import silk from other major urban centers on the Mediterranean. The silk produced by the Byzantines was well known for its high quality, owing to the meticulous attention paid to the execution of its weaving and decoration, with weaving techniques taken from Egypt used to produce the fabric. The first diagrams of semple looms appeared in the 5th century.

The Arabs, with their widening conquests, spread sericulture across the shores of the Mediterranean, leading to the development of sericulture in North Africa, Andalusia, Sicily and Southern Italy's Calabria, which was under the Byzantine dominion. According to André Guillou, mulberry trees for the production of raw silk were introduced to southern Italy by the Byzantines at the end of the 9th century. Around 1050, the theme of Calabria had cultivated 24,000 mulberry trees for their foliage, with growth still ongoing. The interactions among Byzantine and Muslim silk-weaving centers of all levels of quality, with imitations made in Andalusia and Lucca, among other cities, have made the identification and dating of rare surviving examples difficult to pinpoint.

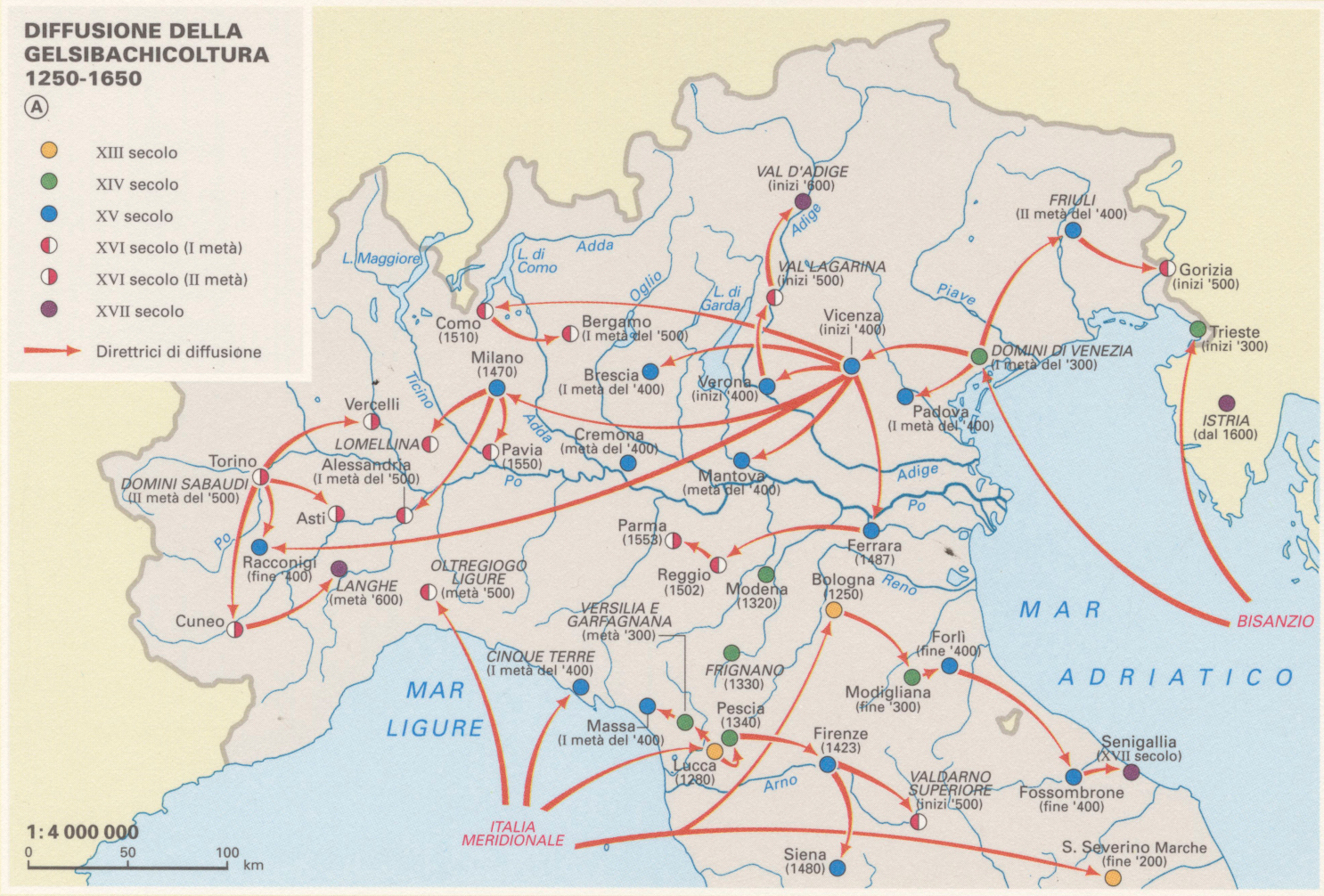
Silk production in Northern Italy from 13th to 17th centuries

Catanzaro, in the region of Calabria, was the first center to introduce silk production to Italy between the 9th and the 11th century. During the following centuries, the silk of Catanzaro supplied almost all of Europe and was sold in a large market fair in the port of Reggio Calabria to Spanish, Venetian, Genoese, Florentine and Dutch merchants. Catanzaro became the lace capital of Europe, with a large silkworm breeding facility that produced all the laces and linens used in the Vatican. The city was famous for its fine fabrication of silks, velvets, damasks, and brocades. While the cultivation of mulberry was moving first steps in Northern Italy, silk made in Calabria reached a peak of 50% of the whole Italian/European production. As the cultivation of mulberry was difficult in Northern and Continental Europe, merchants and operators used to purchase raw materials in Calabria in order to finish the products, before reselling them for a higher price. Genoese silk artisans also used fine Calabrian and Sicilian silk for the production of velvets.

While the Chinese lost their monopoly on silk production, they were able to re-establish themselves as major silk suppliers during the Tang dynasty, and to industrialize their production on a large scale during the Song dynasty. China continued to export high-quality fabric to Europe and the Near East along the Silk Road; however, following the beginning of the first Crusades, techniques of silk production began to spread across Western Europe.

In 1147, while Byzantine emperor Manuel I Komnenos was focusing all his efforts on the Second Crusade, the Norman king Roger II of Sicily attacked Corinth and Thebes, two important centers of Byzantine silk production. They took the crops and silk production infrastructure, and deported all the workers to Palermo and Calabria, thereby causing the Norman silk industry to flourish. The sack of Constantinople by the Fourth Crusade in 1204 brought decline to the city and its silk industry, and many artisans left the city in the early 13th century. Italy developed a large domestic silk industry after 2,000 skilled weavers came from Constantinople. Many also chose to settle in Avignon to furnish the popes of Avignon.

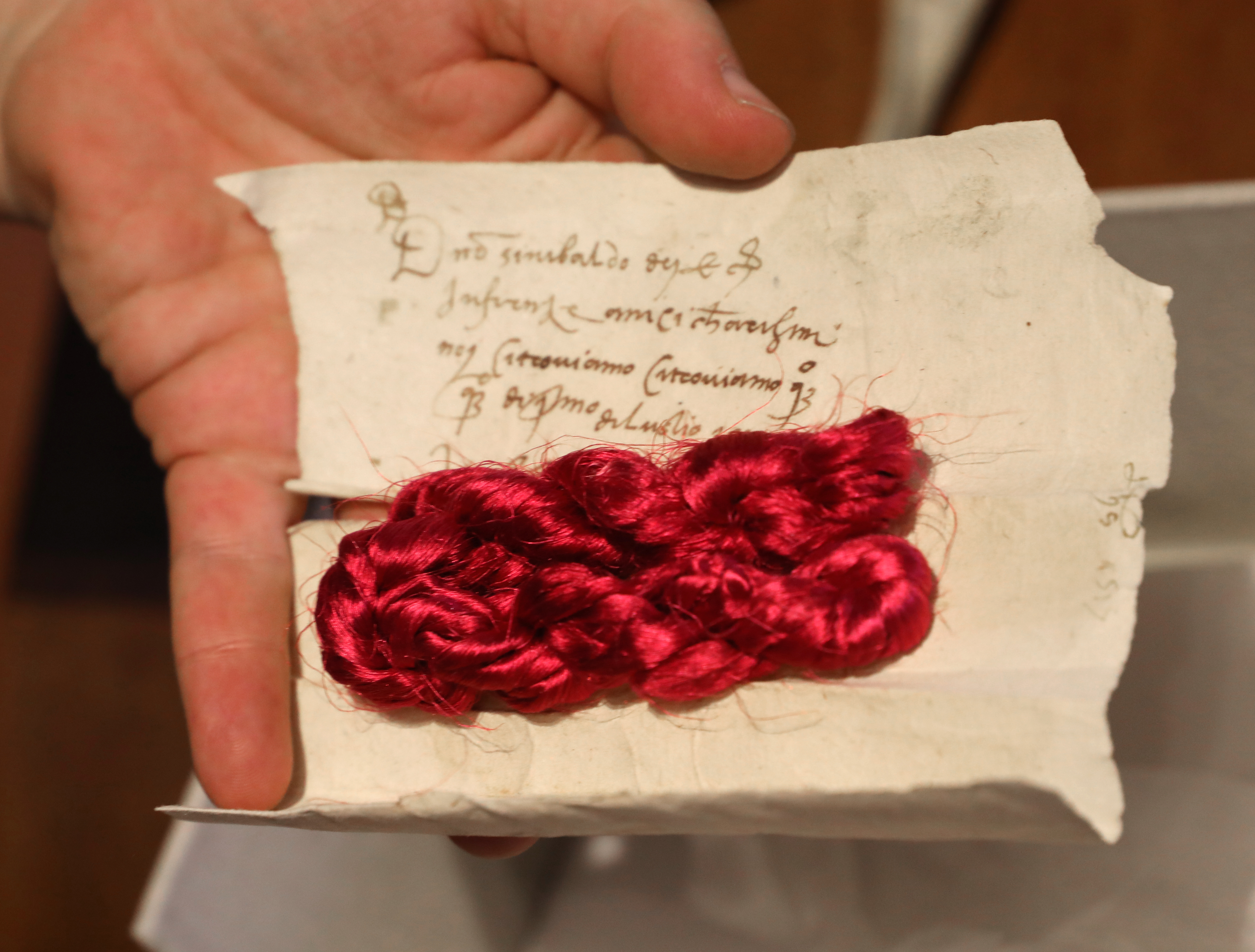
An original sample of Italian Renaissance silk died in magenta (the sample was found in an account book dating from 1513–1521 in the Salviati Archive in Pisa, and it has preserved its original coloration, as it was not exposed to light over the centuries).

The sudden boom of the silk industry in the Italian state of Lucca, starting in the 11th and 12th centuries, was due to much Sicilian, Jewish, and Greek settlement, alongside many other immigrants from neighboring cities in southern Italy. With the loss of many Italian trading posts in the Orient, the import of Chinese styles drastically declined. In order to satisfy the demands of the rich and powerful bourgeoisie for luxury fabrics, the cities of Lucca, Genoa, Venice and Florence increased the momentum of their silk production, and were soon exporting silk to all of Europe, with 84 workshops and at least 7,000 craftsmen in Florence in 1472 alone.

In 1519, Emperor Charles V formally recognized the growth of the industry of Catanzaro by allowing the city to establish a consulate of the silk craft, charged with regulating and check in the various stages of a production that flourished throughout the 16th century. At the moment of the creation of its guild, the city declared that it had over 500 looms. By 1660, when the town had about 16,000 inhabitants, its silk industry kept 1,000 looms, and at least 5,000 people, in employment. The silk textiles of Catanzaro were not only sold at the Kingdom of Naples's markets, they were also exported to Venice, France, Spain and England.

== Use of silk in the Medieval period (5th–15th century) ==
=== Importance as a luxury good ===
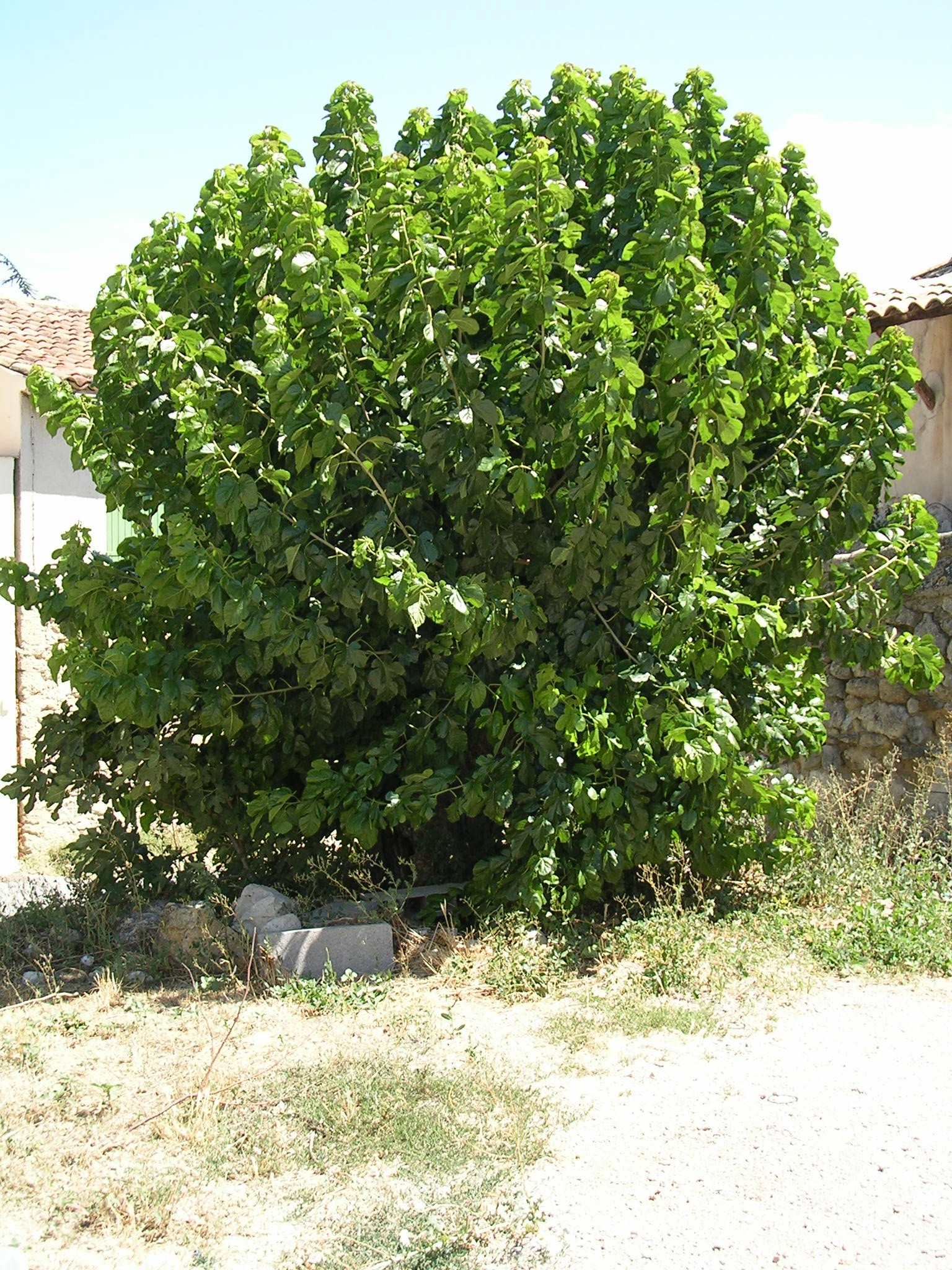
A mature mulberry tree in Provence.

The high Middle Ages (1000–1250 AD) saw continued use of established techniques for silk manufacture without change in either materials or tools used. Small changes began to appear between the 10th and 12th centuries, followed by larger and more radical innovations in the 13th century, resulting in the invention of new fabrics; other, more mundane fabrics made of hemp and cotton also developed. Silk remained a rare and expensive material, but improved technology saw Byzantine magnaneries in Greece and Syria (6th to 8th centuries), silk production centres in Calabria and those of the Arabs in Sicily and Spain (8th to 10th centuries) able to supply the luxury material in much greater abundance.

=== Improved silk production technology ===
The 13th century saw an improvement in the already-changing technology of silk production; as with the Industrial Revolution of late-18th century England, advances in silk production also possibly accompanied more general advances in the technology of modern society as a whole. At the beginning of the 13th century, a primitive form of milling silk yarns was in use; Jean de Garlande's 1221 dictionary and Étienne Boileau's 1261 Livre des métiers (Tradesman's Handbook) both illustrate many types of machinery which can only have been doubling machines. This machinery was further perfected in Bologna between 1270 and 1280.

From the start of the 14th century, many documents allude to the use of complex weaving machinery. Depictions of fabric production techniques from this time period can be found in several places; the earliest surviving depiction of a European spinning wheel is a panel of stained glass in the Cathedral of Chartres, alongside bobbins and warping machines appearing both together in the stained glass at Chartres and in a fresco in the Cologne Kunkelhaus (c. 1300). It is possible that the toothed warping machine was created by the silk industry, as it allowed the for a longer length of warp to hold more uniformity throughout the length of the cloth.

Towards the end of the 14th century, no doubt on account of the devastation caused mid-century by the Black Death, trends began to shift towards less expensive production techniques. Many techniques that earlier in the century would have been completely forbidden by the guilds for low-quality production were now commonplace (such as using low-quality wool, carding, etc.). In the silk industry, the use of water-powered mills grew.

In the second half of the 15th century, drawloom technology was first brought to France by an Italian weaver from Calabria, known as Jean le Calabrais, who was invited to Lyon by Louis XI. He introduced a new kind of machine, which had the ability to work the yarns faster and more precisely. Further improvements to the loom were made throughout the century.

== The silk industry in France ==
French production of fresh silkworm cocoons.

Though highly regarded for its quality, Italian silk cloth was very expensive, both due to the costs of the raw materials and the production process. The craftsmen in Italy proved unable to keep up with the needs of French fashions, which continuously demanded lighter and less expensive materials. These materials, used for clothing, began to be produced locally instead; however, Italian silk remained for a long time amongst the most prized, mostly for furnishings and the brilliant nature of the dyestuffs used.

Following the example of the wealthy Italian city-states of the era, such as Venice, Florence, and Lucca (which had become the center of the luxury-textile industry), Lyon obtained a similar function in the French market. In 1466, King Louis XI decided to develop a national silk industry in Lyon, and employed a large number of Italian workers, mainly from Calabria. The fame of the master weavers of Catanzaro spread throughout France, and they were invited to Lyon in order to teach the techniques of weaving. The drawloom that appeared in those years in France was called loom by Jean Le Calabrais.

In the face of protests by the people of Lyon, Louis XI conceded to move silk production to Tours, but the industry in Tours stayed relatively marginal. His main objective was to reduce France's trade deficit with the Italian states, which caused France to lose 400,000 to 500,000 golden écus a year. It was under Francis I in around 1535 that a royal charter was granted to two merchants, Étienne Turquet and Barthélemy Naris, to develop a silk trade in Lyon. In 1540, the king granted a monopoly on silk production to the city of Lyon. Starting in the 16th century, Lyon became the capital of the European silk trade, notably producing many reputable fashions. Gaining confidence, the silks produced in the city began to abandon their original Oriental styles in favor of their own distinctive style, which emphasized landscapes. Thousand of workers, the canuts, devoted themselves to the flourishing industry. In the middle of the 17th century, over 14,000 looms were used in Lyon, and the silk industry fed a third of the city's population.

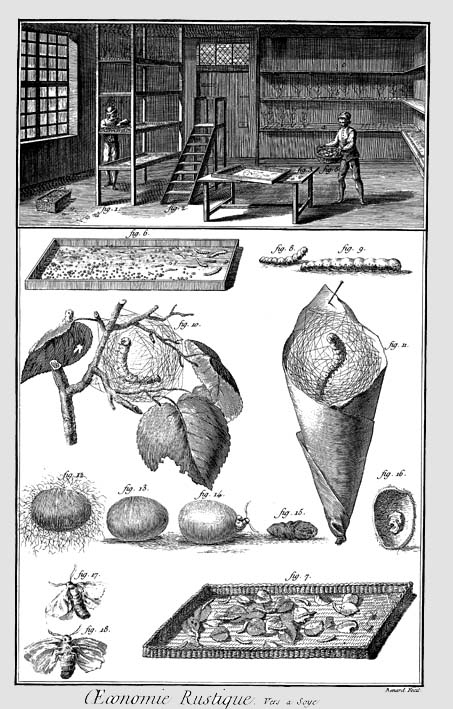
A picture from the Encyclopédie of Diderot and d'Alembert, showing the different steps in sericulture and the manufacture of silk.

In the 18th and 19th centuries, Provence experienced a boom in sericulture that would last until World War I, with much of the silk shipped north to Lyon. Viens and La Bastide-des-Jourdans are two of the communes of Luberon that profited the most from its now-extinct mulberry plantations. However, silk centers still operate today. Working at home under the domestic system, silk spinning and silk treatment employed many people and increased the income of the working class.

=== Silk industries in other countries ===
England under Henry IV (1367–1413) also looked to develop a silk industry, but no opportunity arose until the revocation of the Edict of Nantes the 1680s, when hundreds of thousands of French Huguenots, many of whom were skilled weavers and experts in sericulture, began immigrating to England to escape religious persecution. Some areas, including Spitalfields, saw many high-quality silk workshops spring up, their products distinct from continental silk largely by the colors used. Nonetheless, the British climate prevented England's domestic silk trade from becoming globally dominant.

Many envisioned starting a silk industry in the British colonies in America, starting in 1619 under the reign of King James I of England; however the silk industry in the colonies never became very large. Likewise, silk was introduced to numerous other countries, including Mexico, where it was brought by Cortez in 1522. Only rarely did these new silk industries grow to any significant size.

== Silk in the modern day (1760–present) ==
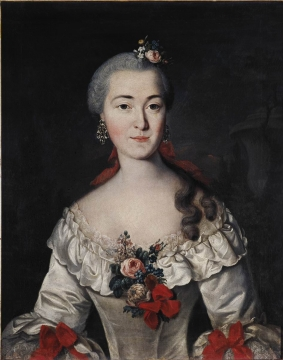
Portrait of Maria Ivanovna Tatischeva by David Lüders (1759) Moscow, State Tretyakov Gallery Mme Tatischeva is shown wearing a paduasoy silk dress.

=== The Industrial Revolution ===
The start of the Industrial Revolution was marked by a massive boom in the textile industry in general, with remarkable technological innovations made, led by the cotton industry of Great Britain. In its early years, there were often disparities in technological innovation between different stages of fabric manufacture, which encouraged complementary innovations. For example, spinning progressed much more rapidly than weaving.

The silk industry, however, did not gain any benefit from innovations in spinning, as silk did not require spinning in order to be woven. Furthermore, the production of silver, and gold silk brocades was a very delicate and precise process, with each color needing its own dedicated shuttle. In the 17th and 18th centuries, progress began to be made in the simplification and standardization of silk manufacture, with many advances following one after another. Bouchon and Falcon's punched card loom appeared in 1775, later improved on by Jacques de Vaucanson. Later, Joseph-Marie Jacquard improved on the designs of Falcon and Vaucanson, introducing the revolutionary Jacquard loom, which allowed a string of punched cards to be processed mechanically in the correct sequence. The punched cards of the Jacquard loom were a direct precursor to the modern computer, in that they gave a (limited) form of programmability. Punched cards themselves were carried over to computers and were ubiquitous until their obsolescence in the 1970s. From 1801, embroidery-style designs became highly mechanized, due to the effectiveness of the Jacquard loom in imitating embroidered fabrics. The mechanism behind the Jacquard looms even allowed complex designs to be mass-produced.

The Jacquard loom was immediately denounced by workers, who accused it of causing unemployment, but it soon became vital to the industry. The loom was declared as public property in 1806, and Jacquard was rewarded with a pension and a royalty on each machine. In 1834, there were a total of 2,885 Jacquard looms in Lyon alone. The Canut revolt in 1831 foreshadowed many of the larger worker uprisings of the Industrial Revolution. The canuts occupied the city of Lyon, refusing to relinquish it until a bloody repression by the army, led by Marshal Soult. A second revolt, similar to the first, took place in 1834.

=== Decline in the European silk industry ===
The decline in the European silk industry has roots in epidemics among silkworm populations. In 1849, France's silk crop failed due to an unknown disease affecting the silkworms. The disease remained pervasive, and soon spread to Italy, Spain, Syria, Turkey, and China. In 1807, bacteriologist Agostino Bassi began a 25-year investigation into what caused the silkworm disease mal de segno (white muscardine disease). In 1835, he published Del mal del segno, calcinaccio o moscardino ("The Disease of the Sign, Calcinaccio or Muscardine") in which he demonstrated the disease was caused by the parasitic fungus Beauveria bassiana. His findings were the first to demonstrate the transmission of disease between animals, and led to a better understanding of how the disease was transmitted between silkworms. This enabled silk producers to better prevent the transmission of Beauvaria bassiana.

Muscardine was not the only disease to affect the European silk industry at this time. In France, disease among silkworms continued to devastate silk production in the country. In 1865, Jean-Baptiste Dumas, France's Minister of Agriculture and Commerce, asked Louis Pasteur to study what was causing the epidemic. Pasteur investigated the cause between 1865 and 1870, leading to his discovery of two separate diseases infecting the silkworms: pébrine and flacherie. Pébrine, known as "pepper disease," was caused by the microsporidia Nosema bombycis and characterized by brown dots. Pasteur published his findings and recommendations for silk farmers. Soon, he received feedback from farmers who had followed his recommendations. Most had reared healthy crops, other farmers had not. With more investigation, he discovered the worms were infected with something other than pébrine. The other condition, flacherie, was caused by a viral infection. Pasteur recommended the removal of infected worms from the population. These recommendations allowed silkworm producers to restore their stocks and revive silk production.

Nevertheless, the increase in the price of silkworm cocoons and the reduction in the importance of silk in the garments of the bourgeoisie in the 19th century caused the decline of the silk industry in Europe. The opening of the Suez Canal in 1869 and the silk shortage in France reduced the price of importing Asian silk, particularly from China and Japan.

Starting from the Long Depression (1873–1896), Lyonnais silk production had become totally industrialized, and handlooms were rapidly disappearing. The 19th century saw the textile industry's progress caused by advances in chemistry. The synthesis of aniline was used to make mauveine (aniline purple) dye, and the synthesis of quinine was used to make indigo dye. In 1884, Count Hilaire de Chardonnet invented viscose, intended as an artificial silk, and in 1891 opened a factory dedicated to the production of viscose, which cost much less and in part replaced natural silk.

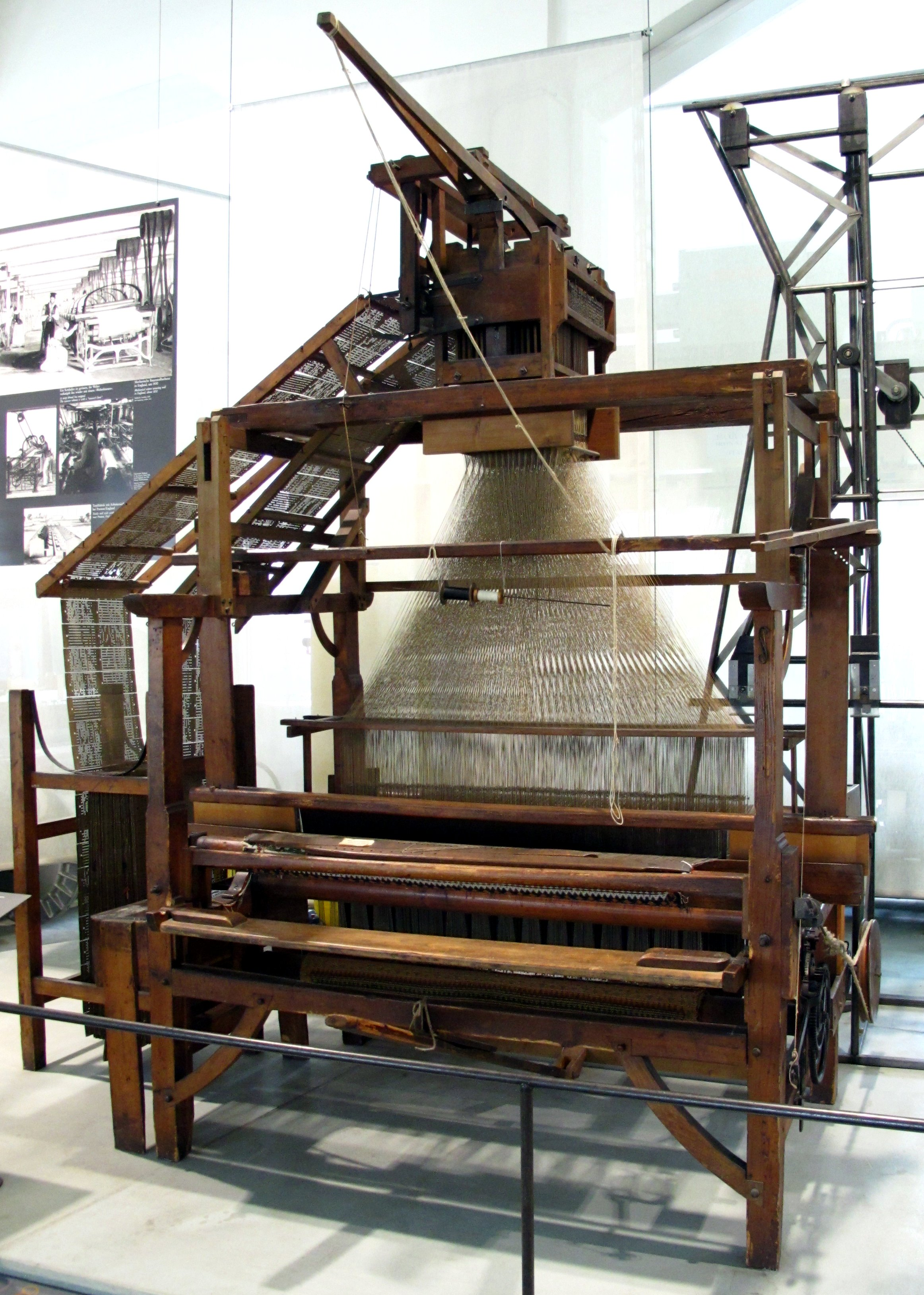
A Jacquard loom.

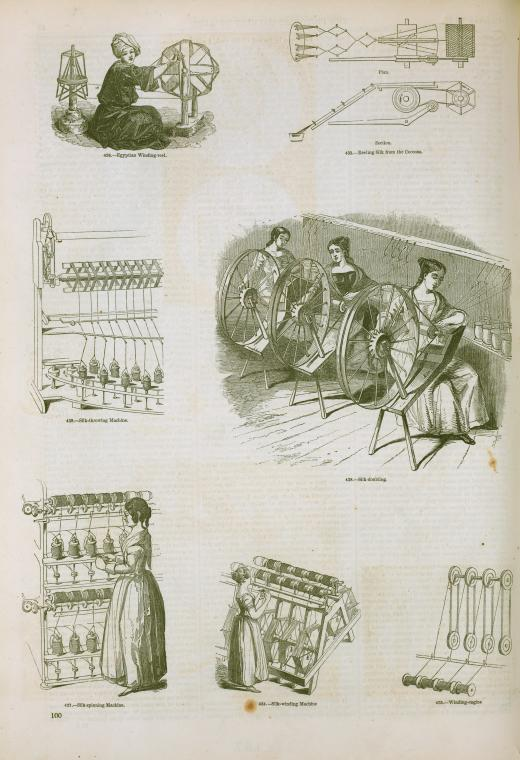
An illustration of spinning, winding, doubling, and throwing machines used in silk textile production in England, 1858.

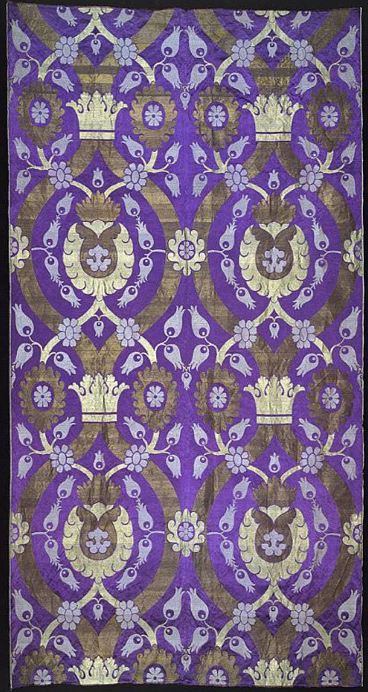
Silk, cotton and gilt-metal-strip-wrapped cotton panel, machine-woven in Scotland c. 1887. The tulip motif is inspired by Turkish textiles.

== Silk in modern times ==
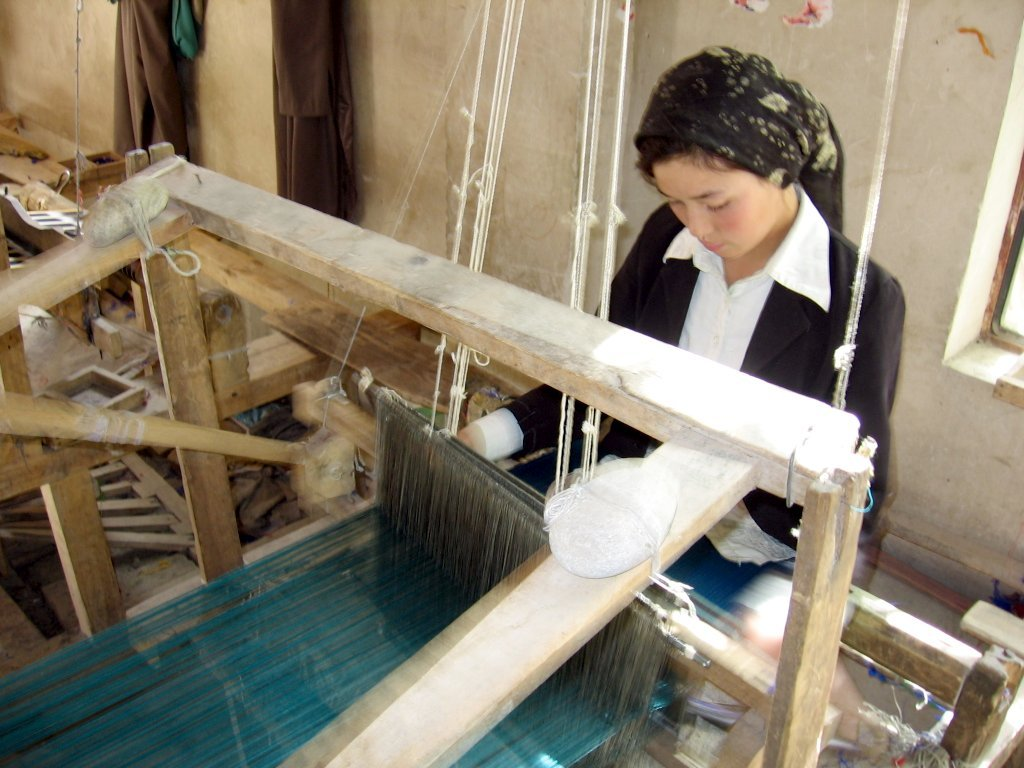
A woman weaving with silk threads in Hotan, China.

Following the crisis in Europe, the modernization of sericulture in Japan made it the world's foremost silk producer. By the early 20th century, rapidly industrializing Japan was producing as much as 60 percent of the world's raw silk, most exports shipping through the port of Yokohama. Italy managed to rebound from the crisis, but France was unable. Urbanization in Europe saw many French and Italian agricultural workers leave silk growing for more lucrative factory work. Raw silk was imported from Japan to fill the void. Asian countries, formerly exporters of raw materials (cocoons and raw silk), progressively began to export more and more finished garments.

During the Second World War, silk supplies from Japan were cut off, so western countries were forced to find substitutes. Synthetic fibers such as nylon were used in products such as parachutes and stockings, replacing silk. Even after the war, silk was not able to regain many of the markets lost, though it remained an expensive luxury product. Postwar Japan, through improvements in technology and a protectionist market policy, became the world's foremost exporter of raw silk, a position it held until the 1970s. The continued rise in the importance of synthetic fibers and loosening of the protectionist economy contributed to the decline of Japan's silk industry, and by 1975 it was no longer a net exporter of silk.

With its recent economic reforms, the People's Republic of China has become the world's largest silk producer. In 1996 it produced 58,000 tonnes out of a world production of 81,000, followed by India at 13,000 tonnes. Japanese production is now marginal, at only 2,500 tonnes. Between 1995 and 1997, Chinese silk production went down 40% in an effort to raise prices, reminiscent of earlier shortages.

In December 2006 the General Assembly of the United Nations proclaimed 2009 to be the International Year of Natural Fibres, so as to raise the profile of silk and other natural fibres.

In 2024, a group of researchers from the Massachusetts Institute of Technology and other institutions created a very thin piece of modified silk that vibrates when electrical voltage is applied. This means it is able to suppress sound waves and insulate noise effectively, even as a thin material.

In the late 2010s and up to the early 2020s, silk pillowcases have become increasingly popular, being associated with skin and hair benefits. These claims are not supported with much scientific research and are anecdotal, mostly because not many studies have been conducted on this topic.

From around 2015, Japanese startups using the “smart sericulture system” have developed products such as shampoo, body soap, and body cream using fibroin, a protein extracted from cocoons.

Silk-based bio-materials are being used in numerous biomedical and biotechnological applications.

Due to silk's mechanical properties and biocompatibility, it has garnered much attention in the field of tissue engineering. New 3D printing techniques for the material have further increased the buzz around it. As of February 2025, silk-based tissue engineering is still in its infancy and is yet to see widespread medical application.
