= Nosema bombycis =

Scientific classification
- Domain: Eukaryota
- Kingdom: Fungi
- Phylum: Rozellomycota
- Class: Microsporidia
- Family: Nosematidae
- Genus: Nosema
- Species: N. bombycis

Binomial name
- Nosema bombycis Nägeli, 1857

Species of microsporidian

Nosema bombycis is a species of Microsporidia of the genus Nosema infecting silkworms, responsible for pébrine. This species was the first microsporidium described, when pebrine decimated silkworms in farms in the mid-19th century. This description was made by Carl Nägeli. Louis Pasteur, taking up an idea of Osimo which had not been successful, showed breeders a practical way to select uninfected individuals to recreate new healthy farms.
