= Carl Nägeli =

Swiss botanist (1817–1891)

Carl Wilhelm von Nägeli
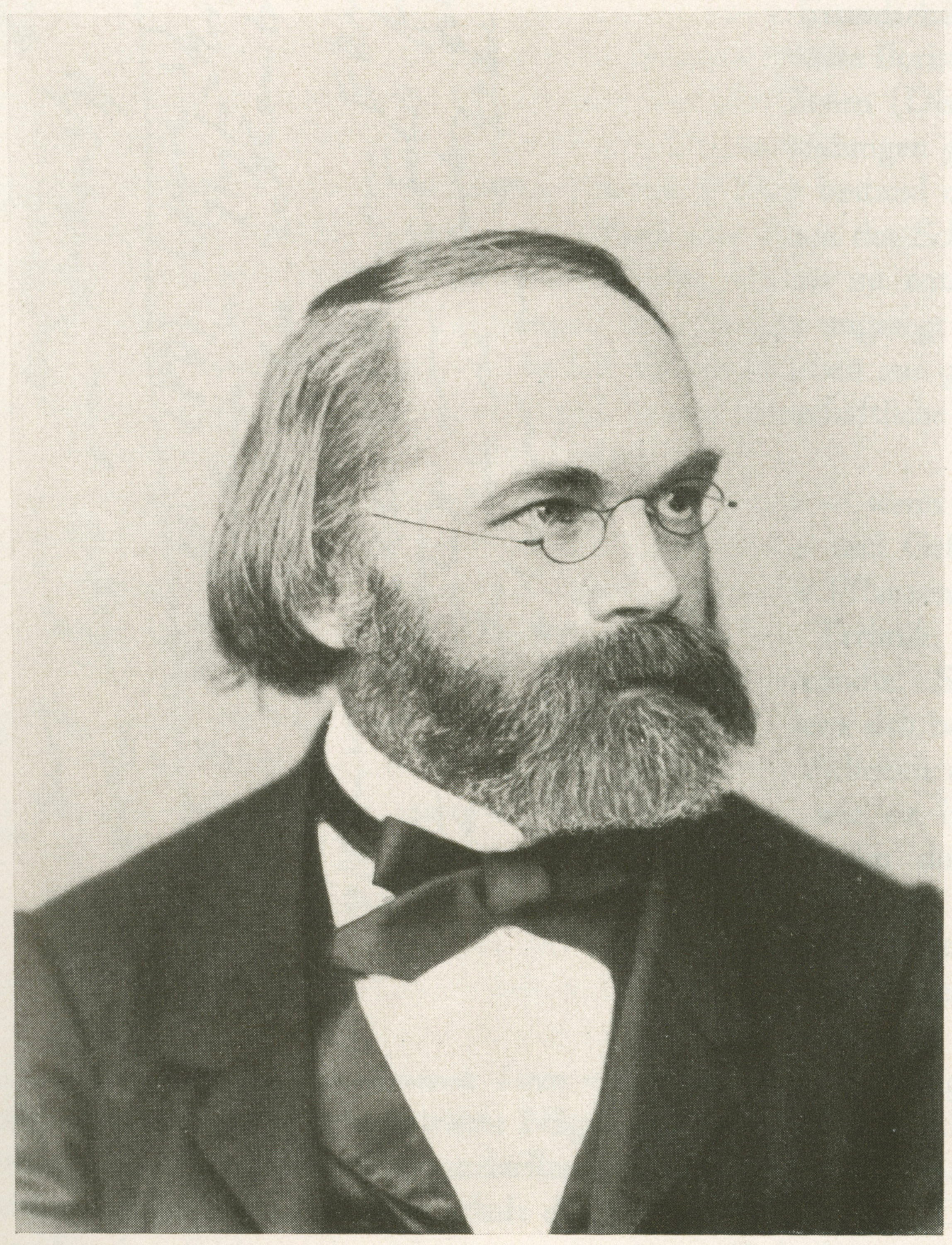
- Born: 26 or 27 March 1817; Kilchberg, Zürich
- Died: 10 May 1891 (aged 74); Munich
- Known for: research on plant anatomy
- Scientific career
- Fields: Botanist
- Author abbrev. (botany): Nägeli

Carl Wilhelm von Nägeli (26 or 27 March 1817 – 10 May 1891) was a Swiss botanist. He studied cell division and pollination but became known as the man who discouraged Gregor Mendel from further work on genetics. He rejected natural selection as a mechanism of evolution, favouring orthogenesis, though the term was only coined in 1893, two years after his death, driven by a supposed "inner perfecting principle".

== Career ==
Carl Nägeli was born the son of a physician in Kilchberg near Zürich. He began studying medicine at the University of Zürich in 1836, but soon switched to botany, studying among others under naturalists Lorenz Oken and Oswald Heer. From 1839, he studied at the University of Geneva under Swiss botanist A. P. de Candolle. In 1840, he received his doctorate in Zürich with a dissertation on the Cirsium species of Switzerland. From 1842 Nägeli worked with German botanist Matthias Schleiden at the University of Jena. After Schleiden directed his attention to the microscopic study of plants, he focused his research on that area. After first becoming Privatdozent, and in 1849 extraordinary professor (a position somewhere between that of an associate professor and a full professor) at the University of Zürich, he held the chair of botany at the University of Freiburg from 1852 to 1856, then ended his career as professor of general botany and microscopy at the Ludwig-Maximilians-Universität München (LMU) from 1857 until his retirement in 1889.

== Scientific contributions ==
=== Cell division ===
It was thought that Nägeli had first observed cell division during the formation of pollen, in 1842. However, this is disputed by Australian geneticist Henry Harris, who writes: "What Nägeli saw and did not see in plant material at about the same time [as Robert Remak] is somewhat obscure... I conclude... that, unlike Remak, he did not observe nuclear division... it is clear that Nägeli did not in 1844 have any idea of the importance of the nucleus in the life of the cell."

=== "Meristem", "xylem", and "phloem" ===
In 1846, Nägeli and German botanist Hugo von Mohl were the first scientists to distinguish the plant cell wall from the cell's inner contents, for which Mohl used the term "protoplasm". Also in 1846, Nägeli and German botanist Wilhelm Hofmeister advanced their "apical cell theory", which aimed to explain the origin and functioning of the shoot apical meristem in plants. In 1857, Nägeli first described microsporidia, the causative agent of pebrine disease in silkworms, which has historically devastated the silk industry in Europe. In 1858, he coined the terms "meristem", "meristematic tissue", "xylem", and "phloem".

=== Mendel, Nägeli, and orthogenesis ===
Nowadays Nägeli is perhaps best known for his unproductive correspondence (1866–1873) with Austrian geneticist and friar Gregor Mendel concerning the latter's celebrated work on Pisum sativum, the garden pea. British writer Simon Mawer, in his book Gregor Mendel: planting the seeds of genetics (2006), gives an account of Nägeli's correspondence with Mendel, underlining that, at the time Nägeli was writing to the friar from Moravia, Nägeli "must have been preparing his great work entitled A mechanico-physiological theory of organic evolution (published in 1884, the year of Mendel's death) in which he proposes the concept of the 'idioplasm' as the hypothetical transmitter of inherited characters". Mawer notes that, in this book, there is not a single mention of the work of Gregor Mendel. That prompted him to write:

We can forgive von Nägeli for being obtuse and supercilious. We can forgive him for being ignorant, a scientist of his time who did not really have the equipment to understand the significance of what Mendel had done despite the fact that he (von Nägeli) speculated extensively about inheritance. But omitting an account of Mendel's work from his book is, perhaps, unforgivable.

Nägeli believed that cells receive their hereditary characters from a part of the protoplasm which he called the "idioplasma". Nägeli was an advocate of orthogenesis and an opponent of Darwinism. He developed an "inner perfecting principle" which he believed directed evolution. He wrote that many evolutionary developments were nonadaptive and variation was internally programmed.

== Works ==
- Die Cirsien der Schweiz (Thesis). 1840.
- A series of papers in the Zeitschrift für wissenschaftliche Botanik (1844–1846)
- Die neueren Algensysteme (1847); Gattungen einzelliger Algen (1849); Pflanzenphysiologische Untersuchungen (1855–1858), with Carl Eduard Cramer
- Beiträge zur wissenschaftlichen Botanik (1858–1868); a number of papers contributed to the Royal Bavarian Academy of Sciences, forming three volumes of Botanische Mitteilungen (1861–1881)
- Mechanisch-physiologische Theorie der Abstammungslehre, published in 1884.

He and Gustav Albert Peter published on the apomictic genus Hieracium the two-volume work, titled

- Die Hieracien Mittel-Europas (Hieracium of Central Europe; 1885–89).

In this context Peter edited the well-known exsiccata Hieracia Naegeliana [exsiccata] (1884–1886) with a number of specimens from the herbarium of Nägeli, some of them observed and collected at the Alter Botanischer Garten (Munich).

== See also ==
- University of Freiburg Faculty of Biology
