= Pébrine =

Disease of silkworms

Pébrine, or "pepper disease," is a disease of silkworms, which is caused by microsporidian parasites, mainly Nosema bombycis and, to a lesser extent, Vairimorpha, Pleistophora and Thelohania species. The parasites infect eggs and are therefore transmitted to the next generation.

The silkworm larvae infected by pébrine are usually covered in brown dots and are unable to spin silkworm thread. Antoine Béchamp was the first one to recognize the cause of this disease when a plague of the disease spread across France.

Nosema bombycis is a microsporidium that kills all of the silkworms hatched from infected eggs and comes from the food that silkworms eat. If silkworms acquire this microsporidium in their larval stage, the worm will become a moth without externally visible signs. However, mother moths carrying the pathogen will pass the microsporidium onto the eggs, and all of the worms hatching from the infected eggs will die in their larval stage. Therefore, it is extremely important to rule out all eggs from infected moths by checking the moth's body fluid under a microscope.

== See also ==
- Flacherie
- Muscardine
