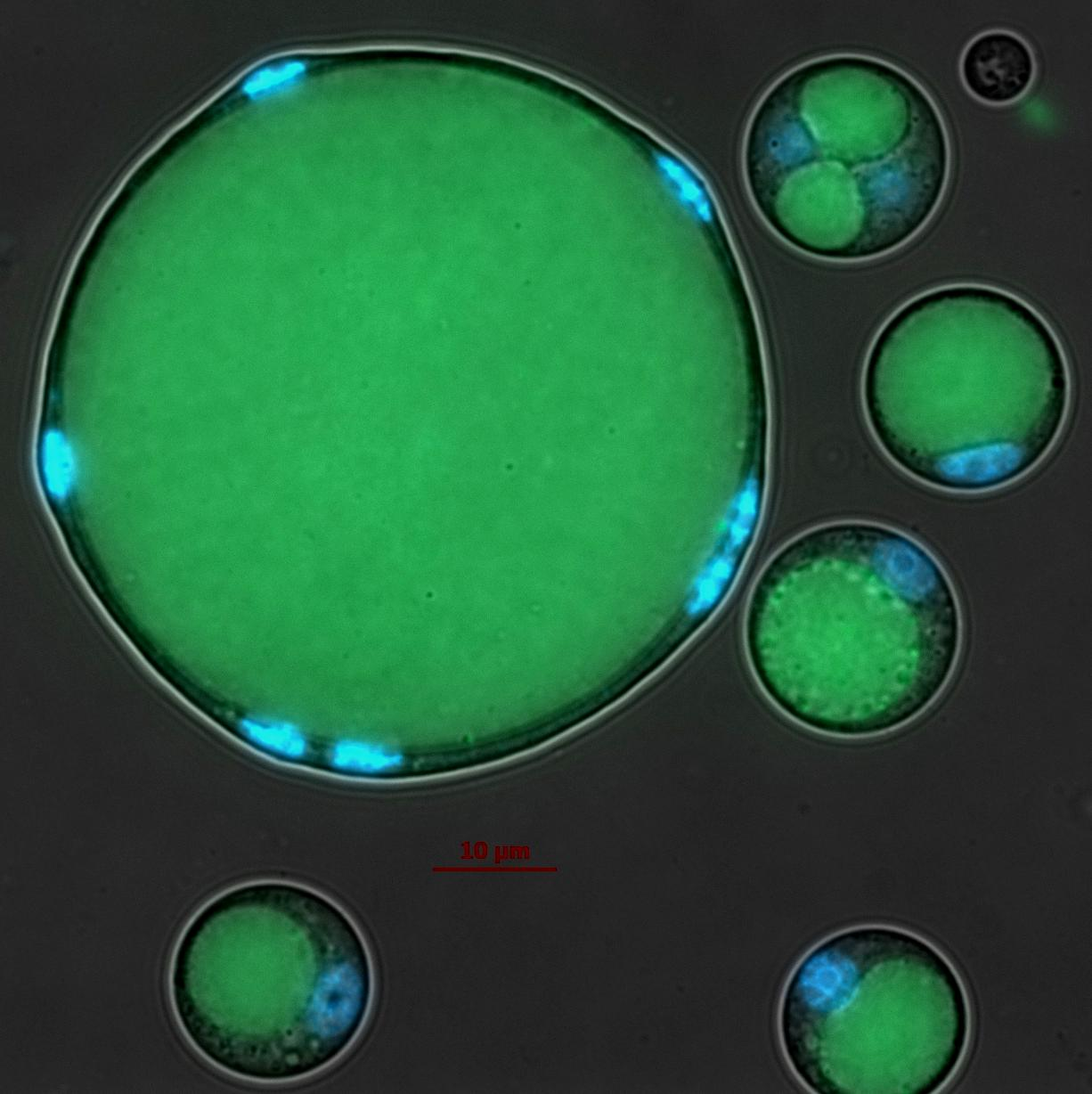
- Colony of A. whisleri stained with Hoechst (cell nuclei in blue) and Lysotracker (green) in vivo

Scientific classification
- Domain: Eukaryota
- Class: Ichthyosporea
- Order: Eccrinida
- Family: Piridae
- Genus: Abeoforma; Marshall & Berbee, 2010
- Species: A. whisleri

Binomial name
- Abeoforma whisleri Marshall & Berbee, 2010

= Abeoforma =

Species of microbe

Abeoforma whisleri is a single-celled eukaryote that belongs to the Ichthyosporea, a group of protists closely related to animals.

== Etymology ==
The generic name Abeoforma is derived from Latin abeo 'change' and forma 'shape', in reference to the dynamic range of shapes exhibited by the organism, which transitions between amoeboid and walled stages. The specific epithet whisleri was given in honor of Dr. Howard Whisler, whose cultivation and experimental studies of Amoebidium are regarded as outstanding contributions to ichthyosporean biology.

== Taxonomy ==
Abeoforma whisleri was discovered by Wyth L. Marshall and Mary L. Berbee as part of culturing efforts of opisthokont protists living in the digestive tracts of marine invertebrates, performed in the 2000s decade. In particular, A. whisleri was isolated from the tract of a species of a filter-feeding mussel, Mytilus. It was collected from the intertidal zone of Brickyard beach in Gabriola Island, Canada, in 2007. This discovery was reported alongside that of Pirum gemmata, which was isolated in Bamfield, in 2004.

Phylogenetic analyses using the SSU rRNA gene place A. whisleri and P. gemmata in the Ichthyosporea, the earliest-branching lineage of Holozoa, the clade containing animals and their closest unicellular relatives. In particular, they belong to the order Eccrinida, otherwise known as Ichthyophonida, an order specialized in parasitizing animals. P. gemmata is continuously resolved as the closest relative of A. whisleri. Due to their genetic proximity, the family Piridae was described to accommodate both species in 2013.

== Description ==
=== Morphology ===
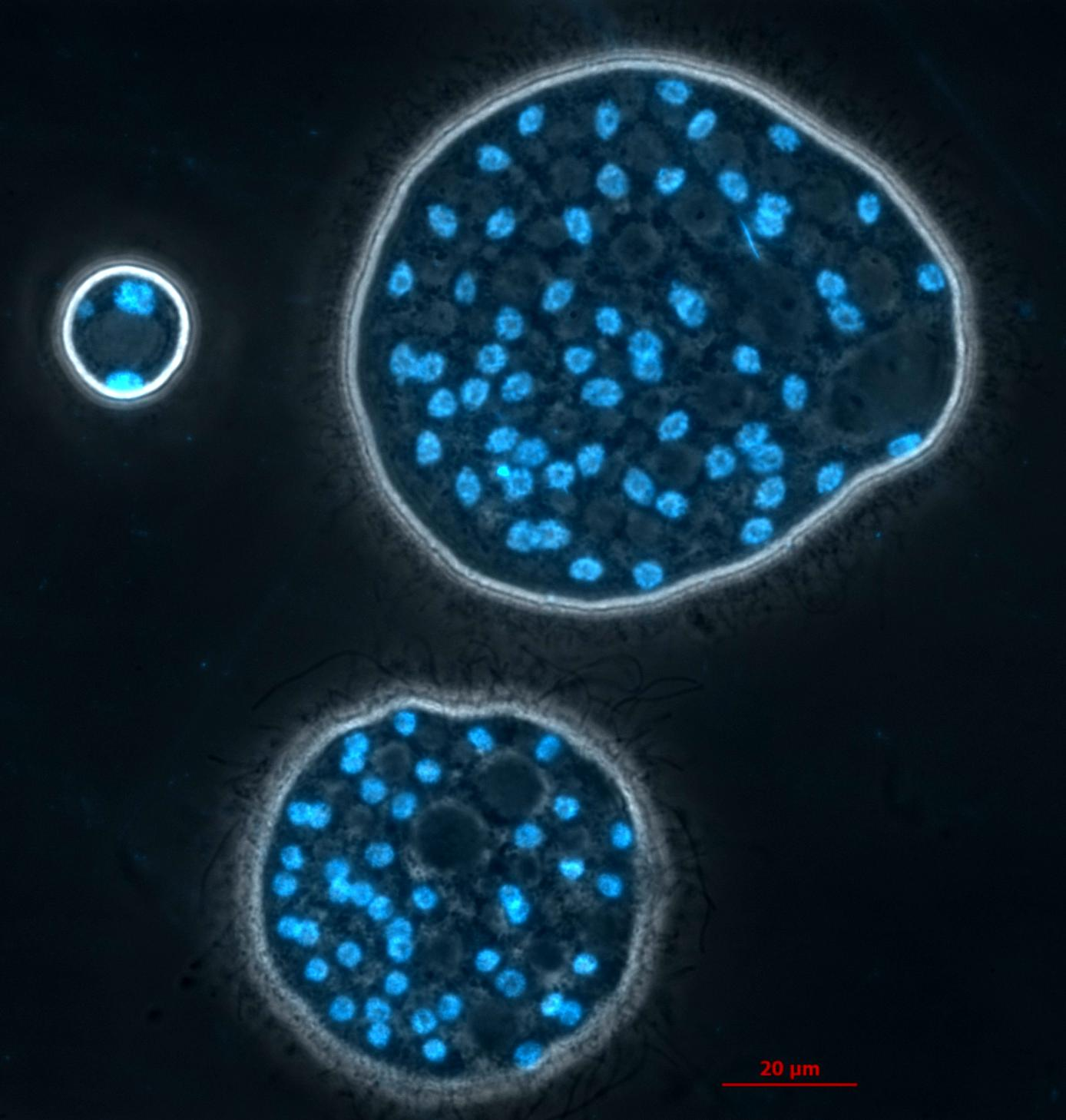
Colony of A. whisleri stained with Hoechst (cell nuclei in blue)

Abeoforma whisleri is a species of microbial eukaryotes with a complex lifecycle that remains to be fully determined, but includes plasmodia and amoebae. The vegetative cells are typically spherical, multinucleate, walled, and with one or more vacuoles occupying most of their volume. They measure up to 50 μm in diameter. The plasmodia are also multinucleate, irregularly shaped, dynamic and variable in size, typically covered by a wall or coat and frequently exceeding 120 μm in length. They often leave a transparent coat after changing shape. The amoebae have a single nucleus each, lack a cell wall and generate numerous narrow pseudopodia around 5 μm wide and up to 25 μm long. Some amoebae appear filose, with short, narrow pseudopodia that appear from most of the surface. Other amoebae are branched, with the cytoplasm concentrated at the ends, separated by narrow cytoplasmic connections. On a macroscopic level, cultured colonies of A. whisleri appear white and slimy with irregular edges.

=== Reproduction ===
Several means of reproduction have been observed. The parent cell commonly releases amoeboid endospores by completely or partially converting into them. Both amoebae and endospores undergo binary fission frequently and repeatedly. The plasmodial stages undergo budding. A less common strategy is the release of non-motile endospores through tears in the parent cell wall.

=== Cell ultrastructure ===
The cell wall, when present, is composed of one to two layers. The primary, innermost layer is composed of a continuous matrix embedded with membrane-bound tubules (MBTs) and patches of channels that, under transmission electron microscopy (TEM), appear light in color. The second, outermost layer, when present, is composed of a network of electron-opaque (dark under TEM) fibres. The cells themselves contain mitochondria with flat cristae, and nuclei with a prominent nucleolus. The nuclei are associated to a spindle pole body with extranuclear microtubules.
