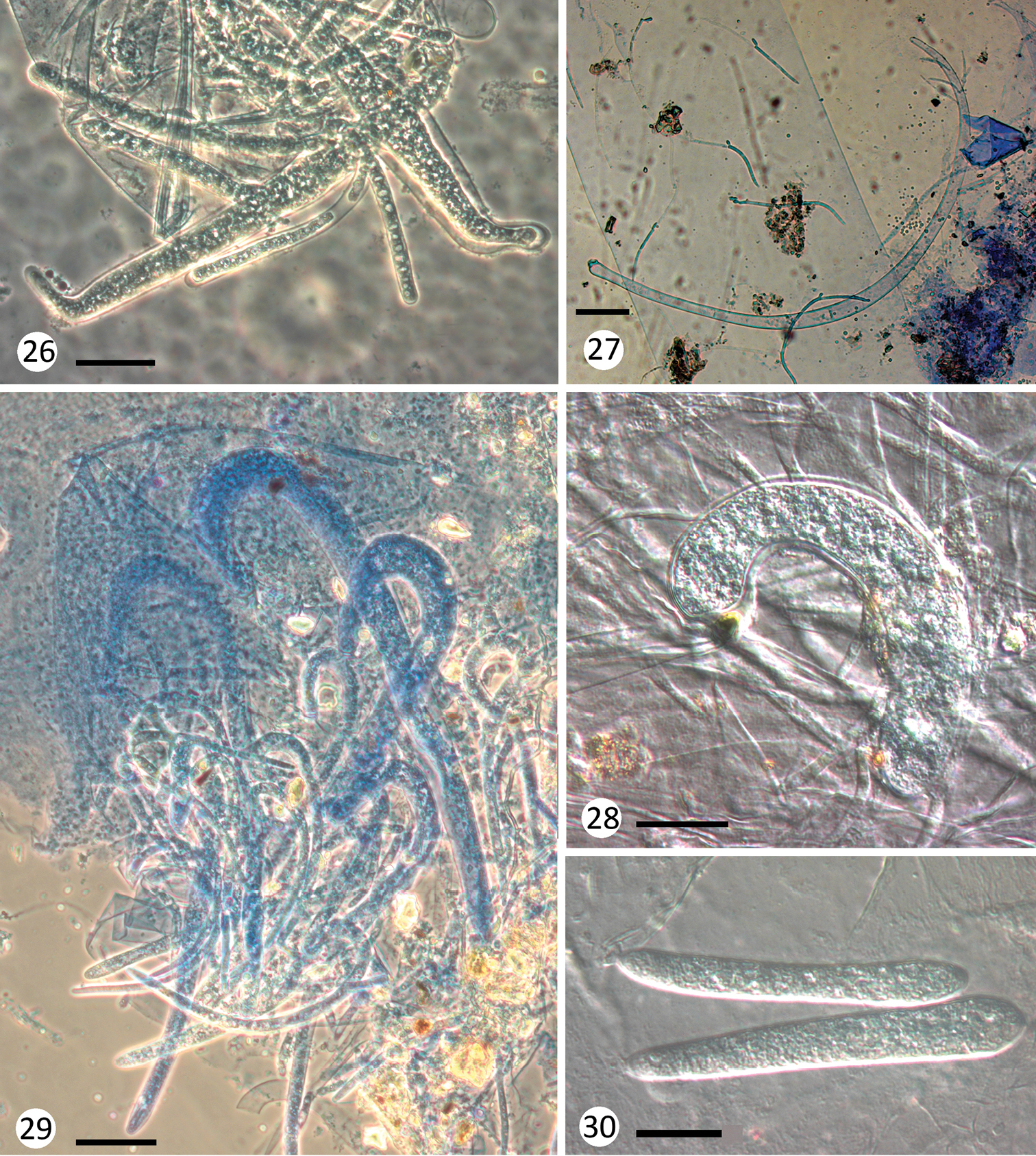

Scientific classification
- Domain: Eukaryota
- Clade: Obazoa
- Clade: Opisthokonta
- Class: Ichthyosporea
- Order: Eccrinida
- Family: Paramoebidiidae; Reynolds et al. 2017

Genus
- Paramoebidium

= Paramoebidiidae =

Family of eukaryotes

Paramoebidiidae is a family of single-celled eukaryotes, previously thought to be zygomycete fungi belonging to the class Trichomycetes, but molecular phylogenetic analyses place the family with the opisthokont group Mesomycetozoea (= Ichthyosporea). The family was originally called Amoebidiaceae, and considered the sole family of the fungal order Amoebidiales that included two genera, Amoebidium and Paramoebidium. However, Paramoebidium is now the sole genus of the family Paramoebidiidae and Amoebidiidae is likewise monogeneric as it was recently emended to include only Amoebidium. Species of Paramoebidium are obligate symbionts of immature freshwater-dwelling arthropod hosts such as mayfly and stonefly nymphs and black fly larvae. Paramoebidium species attach to the digestive tract lining of their host via a secreted holdfast.
