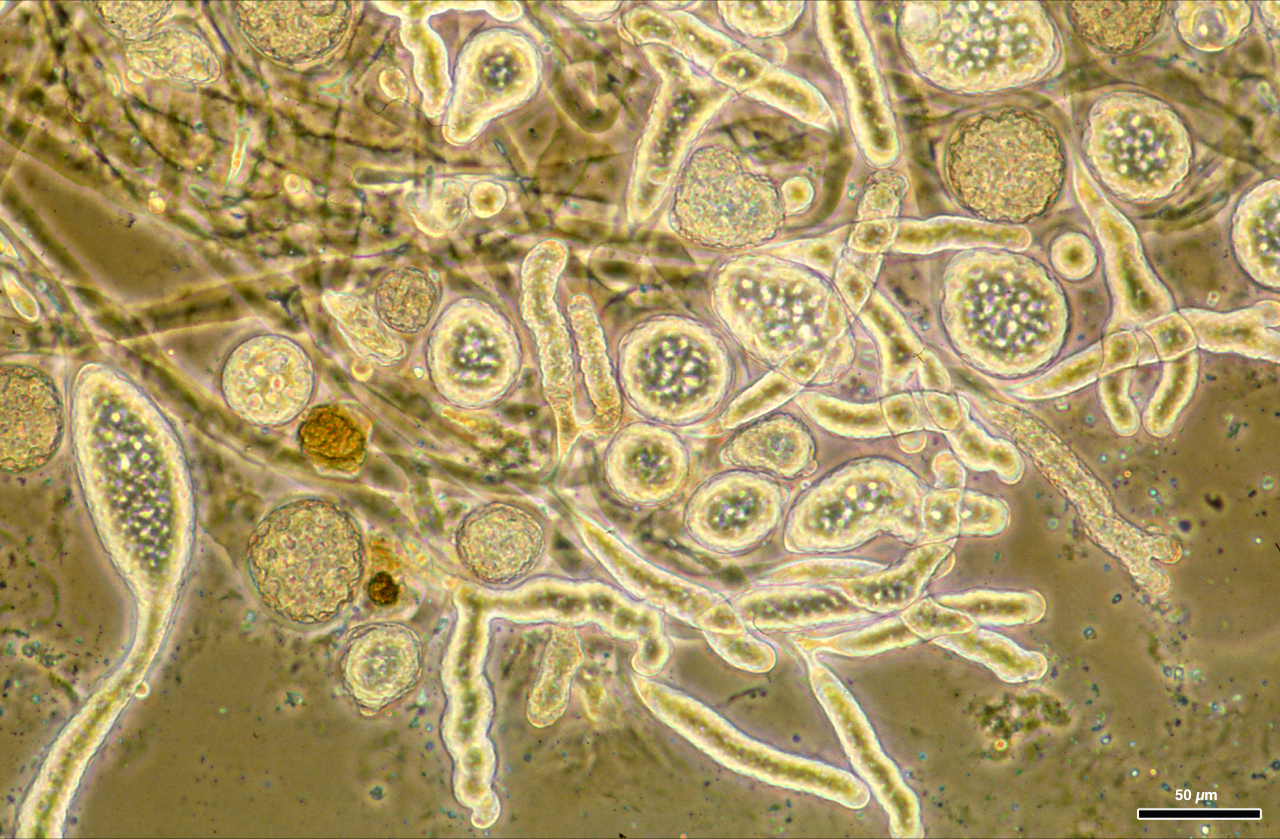
- Hyphas (or germ tubes) and schizonts of Ichthyophonus hoferi.

Scientific classification
- Domain: Eukaryota
- Clade: Obazoa
- Clade: Holozoa
- Class: Ichthyosporea
- Order: Ichthyophonida
- Family: Ichthyophonidae
- Genus: Ichthyophonus
- Species: I. hoferi

Binomial name
- Ichthyophonus hoferi Plehn & Mulsow 1911

= Ichthyophonus hoferi =

Species of protist

Ichthyophonus hoferi is a single-celled protist that occupies a key phylogenetic position to understand the origin of animals. It has chitin cell wall, hyphae, and an amoeboid stage. It is a common parasite of marine and freshwater fishes.

In fish, I. hoferi causes hemorrhages and fin and skin rot, destroys muscle, and induces ova to develop without spermatic fertilization through a toxin.
