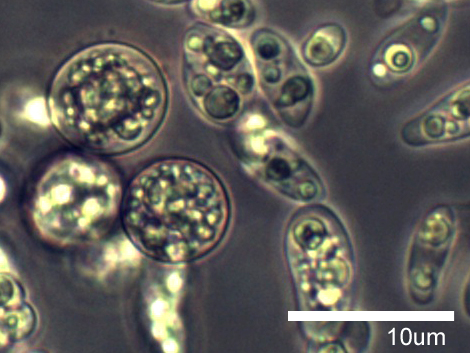
- Amoebidium parasiticum

Scientific classification
- Domain: Eukaryota
- (unranked): Opisthokonta
- (unranked): Holozoa
- Class: Ichthyosporea
- Order: Ichthyophonida
- Family: Amoebidiidae Lichtenstein 1917 ex Kirk, Canon & David 2001

Genera
- Amoebidium

= Amoebidiidae =

Family of protozoa

Amoebidiidae is a family of single-celled eukaryotes, previously thought to be zygomycete fungi belonging to the class Trichomycetes, but molecular phylogenetic analyses place the family with the opisthokont group Mesomycetozoea (= Ichthyosporea). The family was originally called Amoebidiaceae, and considered the sole family of the fungal order Amoebidiales that included two genera: Amoebidium and Paramoebidium. However, Amoebidiidae is now monogeneric as it was recently emended to include only Amoebidium (and Paramoebidium is now the sole genus of the family Paramoebidiidae). Species of Amoebidium are considered obligate symbionts of freshwater-dwelling arthropod hosts such as midge larvae and water fleas (Daphnia). However, because Amoebidium species attach to the exoskeleton (exterior) of the host and grow in axenic culture, at least some species may be facultative symbionts.

== Etymology ==
The "amoeb-" prefix refers to the amoeba-like dispersal cells that are produced during the life cycle of Amoebidium.

== Description ==
As the family is monogeneric, the description follows that of the genus, Amoebidium. Amoebidium species are single-celled, cigar-shaped or tubular in vegetative growth form (= thallus), and attach to the exoskeleton of various freshwater arthropod hosts (Crustaecea or Insecta) by means of a secreted, glue-like basal holdfast. The thalli are coenocytic (i.e. lack divisions within the cell) and are unbranched. Sexual reproduction is unknown. Asexual reproduction may proceed along two different routes: 1) the entire content of the cell divides into elongated, uninucleate spores (known as sporangiospores or endospores) with the cell wall breaking apart to release the spores or 2) the entire content of the cell divides to produce teardrop-shaped, motile amoeboid cells that disperse for a short time, then encyst and produce spores from the cyst (called cystospores). Currently there are five described species in the family.

== Taxonomic and phylogenetic history ==
The classification of Amoebidium and Paramoebidium with the fungal trichomycetes was early considered tenuous due to the production of amoeboid dispersal cells, a feature not seen among Fungi. Later studies found no evidence of chitin in the cell wall of these species, further casting doubt on their relatedness to Fungi. However, their overall morphology (i.e. hair-like growth form with a basal holdfast), production of spores, and residence in the digestive tract of arthropods were considered strong enough characters to include them with the fungal trichomycetes until additional evidence could resolve their placement.

In 2000, two independent studies used molecular phylogenetic evidence to show that Amoebidium parasiticum was more closely related to a small clade of animal-associated protist parasites (known as the DRIP clade at the time) than the fungal trichomycetes. In 2005, Cafaro obtained rDNA sequence data from an unidentified Paramoebidium species and it was placed as sister to Amoebidium in the phylogeny. Therefore, Amoebidiaceae was renamed Amoebidiidae to reflect its classification outside of Fungi and with the protist clade that was renamed Mesomycetozoea. The analyses of Cafaro showed a monophyletic relationship between Amoebidium and Paramoebidium, although his dataset had limited taxon sampling with one representative sequence from each genus.

However, a recent molecular phylogenetic analysis of the Ichthyophonida that included broad taxon and gene sampling found evidence of polyphyly between Amoebidium and Paramoebidium. Although topology tests conducted on the dataset (Approximately Unbiased and Shimodaira-Hasegawa tests) did not reject a sister-taxon relationship of the genera, the authors felt there was enough molecular, physiological, and ecological differences to separate the genera into different families. For example, Amoebidium species attach to the exterior of the host whereas Paramoebidium species reside in the digestive tract and ultrastructural analyses found variations in pore arrangement at the spore tips of Amoebidium parasiticum and Paramoebidium curvum.
