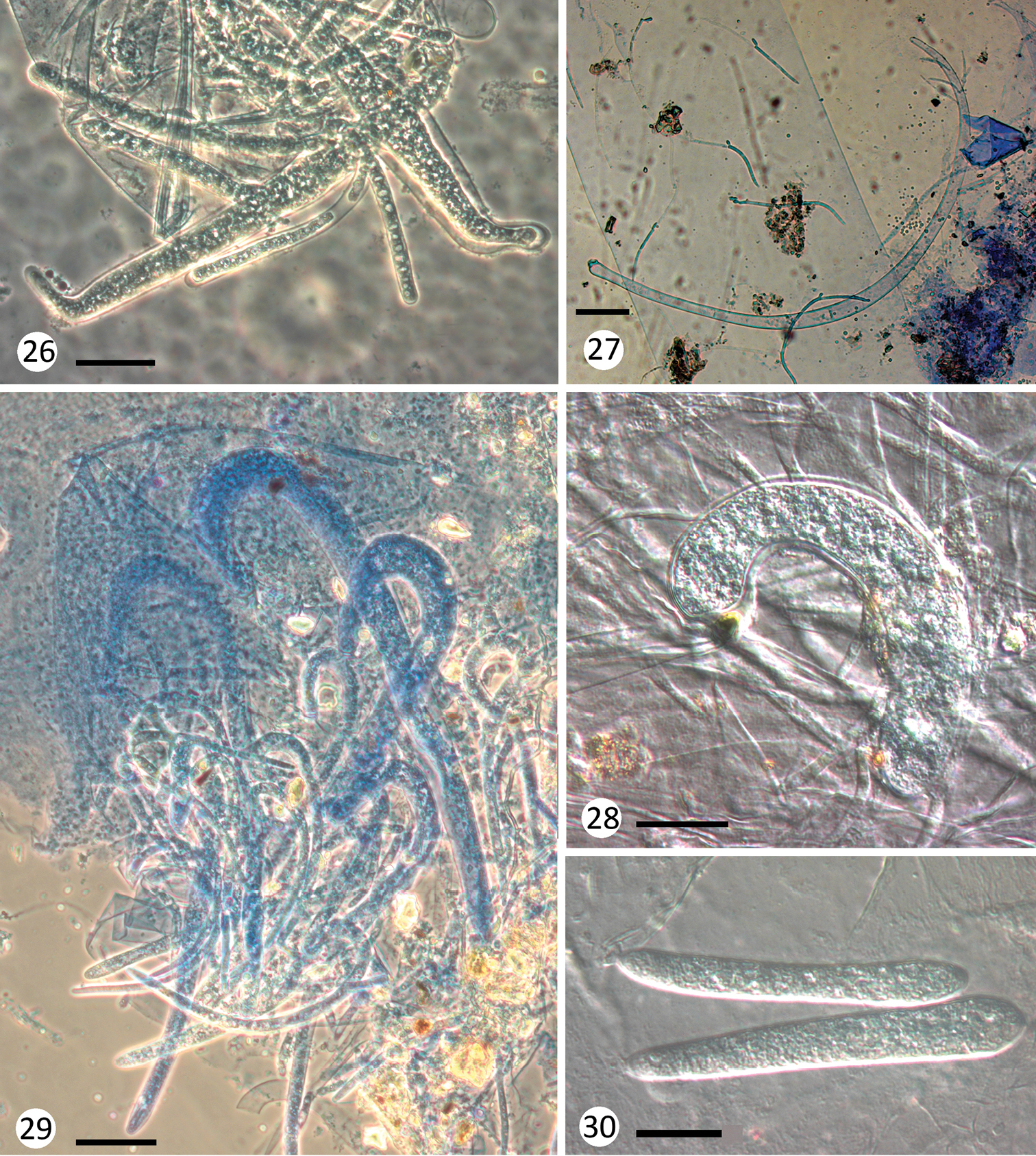

Scientific classification
- Domain: Eukaryota
- Clade: Obazoa
- Clade: Opisthokonta
- Class: Ichthyosporea
- Order: Eccrinida
- Family: Paramoebidiidae
- Genus: Paramoebidium; Léger & Duboscq, 1929

Type species
- Paramoebidium inflexum Léger & Duboscq, 1929

= Paramoebidium =

Genus of eukaryotes

Paramoebidium is a genus of unicellular, symbiotic eukaryotes that inhabit the digestive tract of immature freshwater arthropod hosts (e.g. black fly larvae, mayfly and stonefly nymphs). Paramoebidium is classified in the opisthokont class Mesomycetozoea (= Ichthyosporea), and is the sole genus in the family Paramoebidiidae. Prior to 2005, Paramoebidium species were tentatively placed with the fungal group Trichomycetes due to their habitation of arthropod guts, host overlap between various Paramoebidium and fungal trichomycete taxa, and similar vegetative growth form.

== Etymology ==
The prefix "para-", roughly meaning "similar to", refers to the assumed relatedness of Paramoebidium to the genus Amoebidium. Members of both genera may produce motile, amoeba-like dispersal cells during their life cycle. The similarity of life cycle, morphology, and ecology lead to the hypothesis that Amoebidium and Paramoebidium were minimally closely related, and probably sister taxa.

== Description ==
Paramoebidium species are unicellular. The vegetative cells (= thalli) have an elongate, hair-like growth form with a secreted, glue-like holdfast at the base that attaches them to the host digestive tract lining. Sexual reproduction is unknown. During asexual reproduction, the entire content of the cell is partitioned into many motile amoeboid cells. The cell wall breaks down and the amoeboid cells are released. These amoeboid cells are termed "dispersal amoebae" because they crawl for a short time before encysting. The cyst expands and forms several spores (called cystospores) that are released when mature.

== Species ==
There are currently 17 validly described species of Paramoebidium. Several other species were described but are considered invalid due to a lack of descriptive detail and/or illustrations. Species have been described based on the morphological features of the thalli, cysts, and cystospores. Host type is also reported for species, but it is unclear how host specific different Paramoebidum species may be. Thallus shapes range from straight, short, and fat to long and sigmoidal, to branched or coiled. For example, P. curvum have short, coiled, thick thalli and are found in black fly larvae (Simuliidae), whereas P. hamatum have relatively long thalli that are consistently curved near the base giving them a "candy cane" appearance and are associated mainly with mayfly nymphs (Ameletidae and Baetidae) but also midge larvae. However, while Paramoebidium species are relatively common among trichomycete collections, description of new species is problematic due to the amount of intra- and interspecific variability of the morphological characters. Furthermore, no species have been obtained in axenic culture, so observations are limited to the individuals present at the time of host dissections and some stages of the life cycle (e.g. dispersal amoebae) may not be present in the collection.

List of species:

- Paramoebidium angulatum Valle 2014
- Paramoebidium arcuatum Léger & Duboscq ex Duboscq, Léger & Tuzet 1948
- Paramoebidium argentinense Mazzucch., López-Lastra & Lichtwardt 2000
- Paramoebidium avitruviense Valle 2014
- Paramoebidium bacillare Strongman, Juan Wang & Xu 2010
- Paramoebidium bibrachium Williams & Lichtwardt 1990
- Paramoebidium cassidula Strongman & White 2006
- Paramoebidium chattonii Léger & Duboscq 1929 ex Duboscq, Léger & Tuzet 1948
- Paramoebidium contortum Valle & Busquets 2018
- Paramoebidium corpulentum Lichtwardt & Williams 1991
- Paramoebidium curvum Lichtwardt 1979
- Paramoebidium digitoideum Ferrington, Lichtwardt & López-Lastra 1999
- Paramoebidium dispersum Léger & Duboscq ex Duboscq, Léger & Tuzet 1948
- Paramoebidium eccriniforme Léger & Duboscq ex Duboscq, Léger & Tuzet 1948
- Paramoebidium ecdyonuridae Valle 2014
- Paramoebidium fuscum Duboscq, Léger & Tuzet 1948
- Paramoebidium geniculatum Duboscq, Léger & Tuzet 1948
- Paramoebidium giganteum Duboscq, Léger & Tuzet 1948
- Paramoebidium grande Lichtwardt & Arenas 1996
- Paramoebidium hamatum White 2012
- Paramoebidium inflexum Léger & Duboscq 1929
- Paramoebidium laterale Busquets & Valle 2018
- Paramoebidium papillatum Lichtwardt & Williams 1992
- Paramoebidium pavillardii Manier 1951
- Paramoebidium pinguiculum Strongman & White 2019
- Paramoebidium procloeoni Manier 1951
- Paramoebidium santanderensis Baron & Guardia Valle 2018
- Paramoebidium simulii Tuzet & Manier 1955
- Paramoebidium stipula Strongman & White 2006
- Paramoebidium thrauli Léger & Duboscq ex Duboscq, Léger & Tuzet 1948
- Paramoebidium torpediniforme Strongman & White 2019
- Paramoebidium umbonatum Strongman & White 2008
