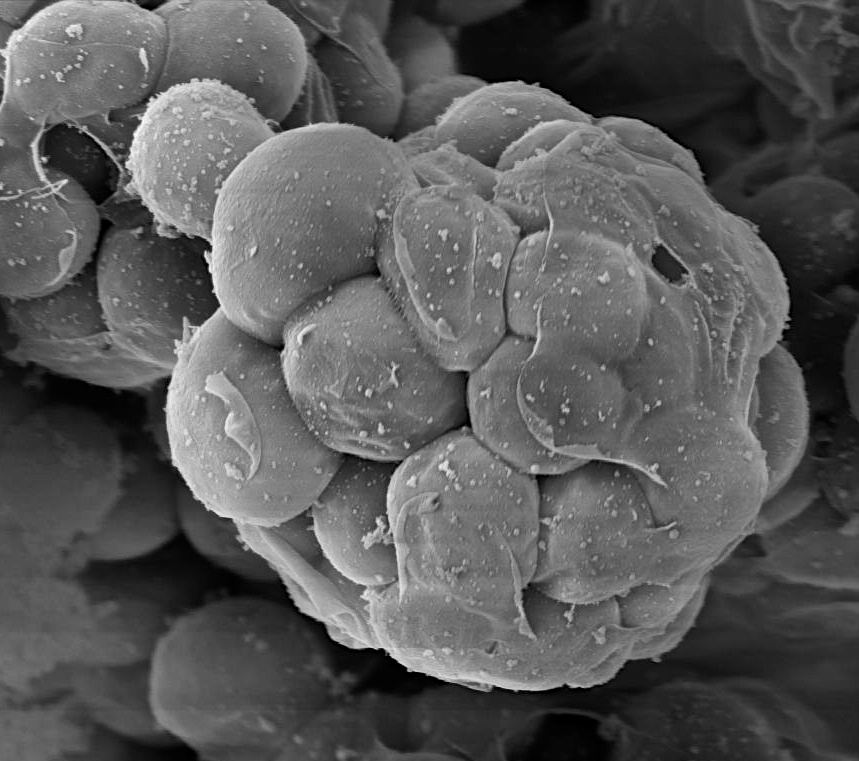

Scientific classification
- Domain: Eukaryota
- Clade: Holozoa
- Class: Ichthyosporea
- Order: Ichthyophonida
- Family: Creolimacidae
- Genus: Creolimax
- Species: C. fragrantissima

Binomial name
- Creolimax fragrantissima Marshall, 2008

Synonyms
- Ichthyophonida sp. fragrantissima

= Creolimax fragrantissima =

Species of protist

Creolimax fragrantissima is a single-celled protist that occupies a key phylogenetic position to understand the origin of animals. It was isolated from the digestive tract of some marine invertebrates, mainly from the peanut worm, collected from the Northeast Pacific.

== Taxonomy ==
Creolimax is a member of the Ichthyosporea, which is the earliest branching holozoan lineage.

== Applications ==
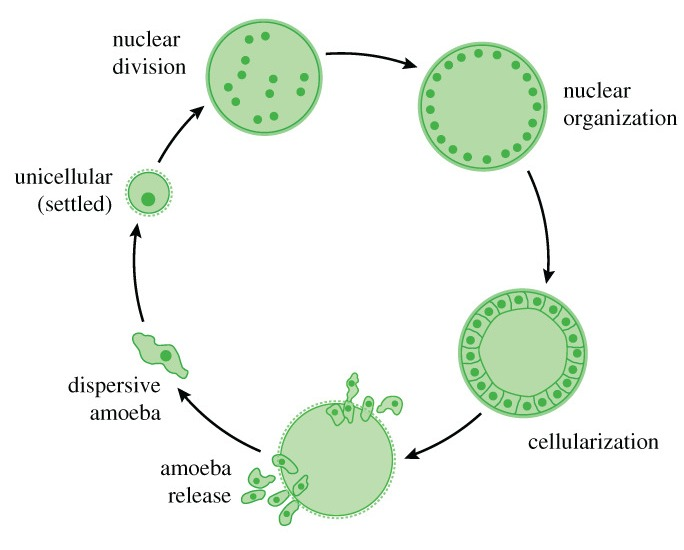
Life cycle of C. fragrantissima

Creolimax is one of the few ichthyosporeans that is culturable. It can be easily grown in the lab through cycles of asexual reproduction. Each cycle comprises two stages. First, a growth stage, in which the cells, which are non-motile, contain several nuclei, a cell wall, and a big central vacuole. This stage is followed by a release of motile amoeboids, which are mono-nucleated and non-dividing. Characterising those two stages can help to elucidate the development of specific cell types in multicellular animals.

Moreover, it has been shown that Creolimax uses a complex gene regulation system, including long non-coding RNAs and exon skipping alternative splicing, which were normally associated with multicellular animals.
