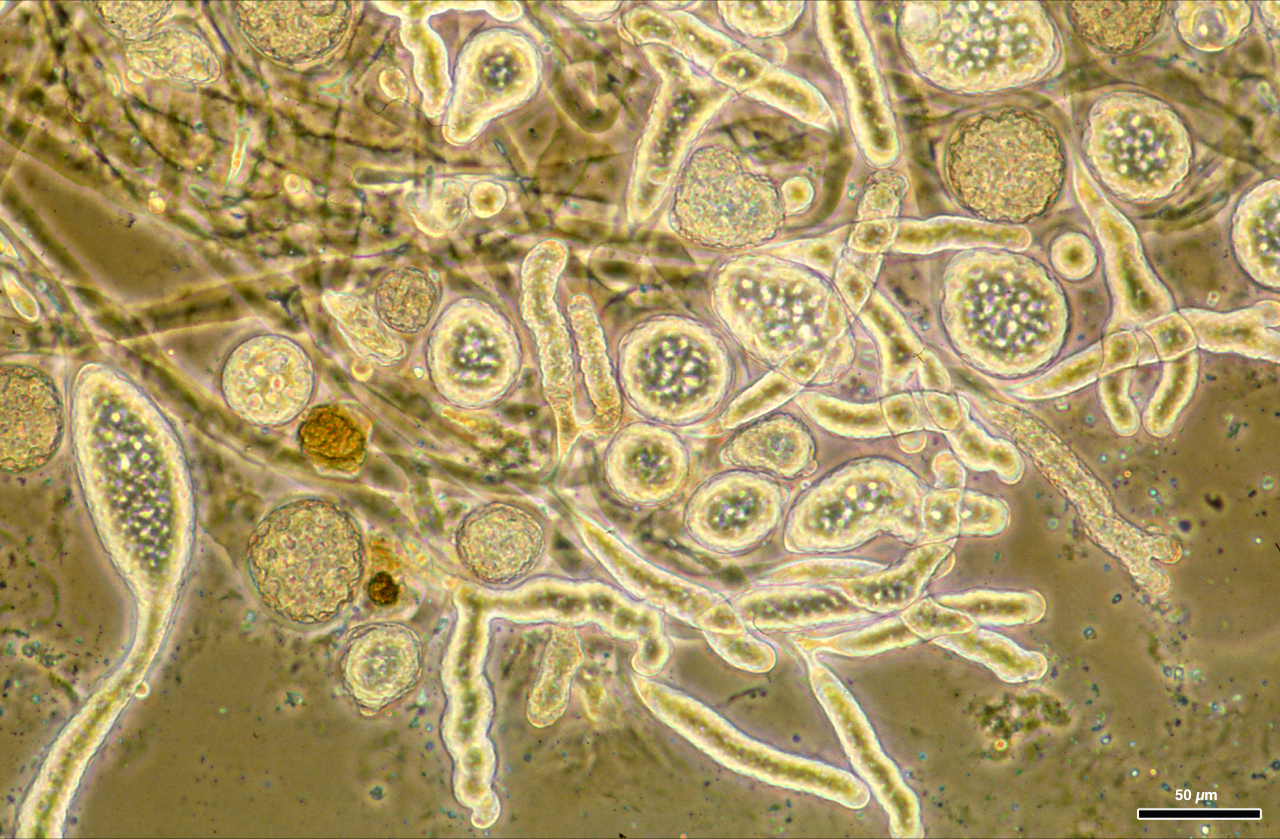
- Hyphae (or germ tubes) and schizonts of Ichthyophonus hoferi

Scientific classification
- Domain: Eukaryota
- Supergroup: Amorphea
- Clade: Obazoa
- Clade: Opisthokonta
- Clade: Holozoa
- Class: Ichthyosporea
- Order: Ichthyophonida
- Family: Ichthyophonidae
- Genus: Ichthyophonus; Plehn & Mulsow 1911

Type species
- Ichthyophonus hoferi Plehn & Mulsow 1911

Species
- Ichthyophonus gasterophilus; Ichthyophonus hoferi; Ichthyophonus intestinalis; Ichthyophonus irregularis; Ichthyophonus lotae

= Ichthyophonus =

Genus of protists

Ichthyophonus is a genus of unicellular eukaryotic parasites of fish. They were once considered to be fungi, but phylogenetic evidence suggests they are protists related to both fungi and animals.

== Species ==
- Ichthyophonus gasterophilus (Caullery & Mesnil 1905) Sprague 1965
- Ichthyophonus hoferi Plehn & Mulsow 1911
- Ichthyophonus intestinalis Léger & Hesse 1923
- Ichthyophonus irregularis Rand et al. 2000
- Ichthyophonus lotae Leger 1925
