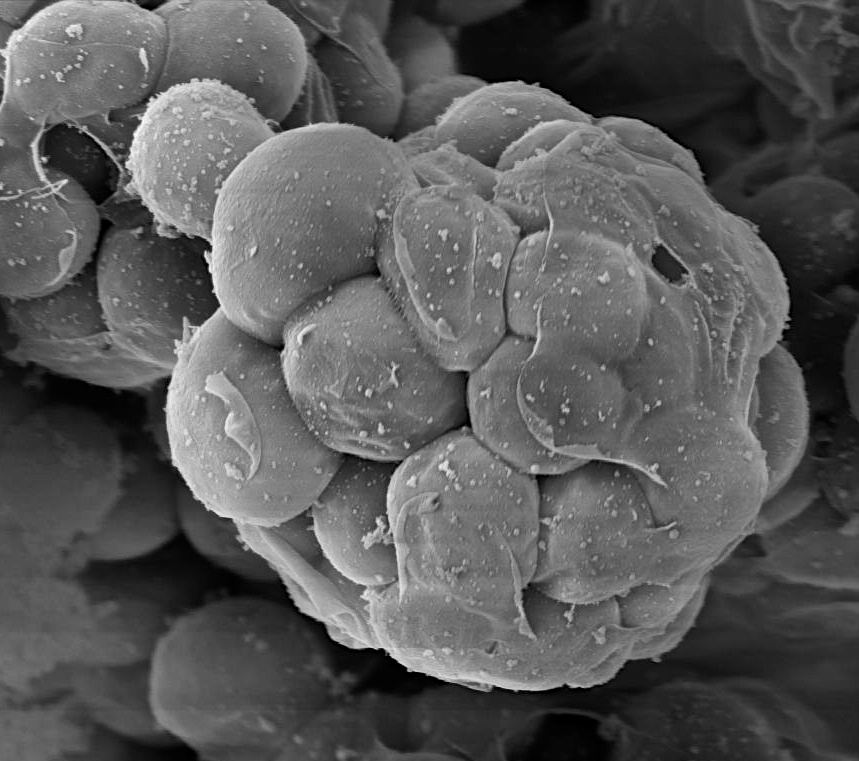
- Creolimax fragrantissima

Scientific classification
- Domain: Eukaryota
- Supergroup: Amorphea
- Clade: Obazoa
- Clade: Opisthokonta
- Clade: Holozoa
- Class: Ichthyosporea
- Order: Eccrinida; Léger & Dubosq 1929

Suborders and families
- Trichomycina; Amoebidiidae; Eccrinidae; Ichthyophonidae; Paramoebidiidae; Parataeniellidae; Sphaeroformina; Creolimacidae; Piridae; Psorospermidae

Synonyms
- Amoebidiales Léger & Duboscq 1929; Ichthyophonae Mendoza et al. 2001; Ichthyophonida Cavalier-Smith 1998

= Eccrinida =

Order of parasitic animals

Eccrinida is an order of parasitic eukaryotes, especialized in parasiting animals.

== Phylogeny ==
- Eccrinida
  - - Creolimacidae
      - Anurofeca
      - - Creolimax
        - Sphaeroforma
  - - - Psorospermidae
        Psorospermis
    - - Piridae
        - Abeoforma
        - - Caullerya
          - Pirum
      - Trichomycina
        - - Amoebidiidae
            Amoebidium
        - - - Ichthyophonidae
              Ichthyophonus
          - - Paramoebidiidae
              Paramoebidium
            - Eccrinida
              - Parataeniellaceae
                Parataeniella
              - Eccrinaceae
                - Eccrinidus
                - - Enterobryus
                  - - Leidyomyces
                    - - - Enteromyces
                        - Arundinula
                      - - Enteropogon
                        - - Taeniella
                          - - Taeniellopsis
                            - - Astreptonema
                              - Palavascia

== Taxonomy ==
Members of Eccrinida include:

- Suborder Sphaeroformina Cavalier-Smith 2012
  - Family Creolimacidae Cavalier-Smith 2012
    - Genus Anurofeca Baker, Beebee & Ragan 1999
    - Genus Creolimax Marschall et al. 2008
    - Genus Sphaeroforma Jostensen et al. 2002 [Pseudoperkinsus Figueras et al. 2000]
  - Family Psorospermidae Cavalier-Smith 2012
    - Genus Psorospermis Cavalier-Smith 2012 [Psorospermium Hilgendorf 1883 non Eimer 1870]
  - Family Piridae Cavalier-Smith 2012
    - Genus Caullerya Chatton 1907
    - Genus Abeoforma Marshall & Berbee 2011
    - Genus Pirum Marshall & Berbee 2011
- Suborder Trichomycina Cavalier-Smith 2012
  - Genus †Paleocadus Poinar 2016
  - Family Amoebidiidae Lichtenstein 1917 ex Kirk et al. 2001
    - Genus Amoebidium Cienkowski 1861
  - Family Ichthyophonidae Cavalier-Smith 2012
    - Genus Ichthyophonus Plehn & Mulsow 1911
  - Family Paramoebidiidae Reynolds et al. 2017
    - Genus Paramoebidium Léger & Duboscq 1929
  - Family Parataeniellaceae Manier & Lichtward 1968
    - Genus Lajassiella Tuzet & Manier 1951 ex Manier 1968
    - Genus Nodocrinella Scheer 1977
    - Genus Parataeniella Poiss. 1929
  - Family Eccrinaceae Leger & Duboscq 1929 [Palavasciaceae Manier & Lichtward 1968]
    - Genus Alacrinella Manier & Ormières ex Manier 1968
    - Genus Arundinula Léger & Duboscq 1906 [Arundinella Léger & Duboscq 1905 non Raddi 1823]
    - Genus Astreptonema Hauptfleisch 1895 [Eccrinella Léger & Duboscq 1933]
    - Genus Eccrinidus Manier 1970
    - Genus Eccrinoides Léger & Duboscq 1929 [Eccrinopsis Léger & Duboscq 1916]
    - Genus Enterobryus [Andohaheloa Manier 1955; Capillus Granata 1908; Cestodella Tuzet, Manier & Jolivet 1957; Daloala Tuzet, Manier & Vog.-Zuber 1952; Eccrina Leidy 1852; Lactella Maessen 1955; Paratrichella Manier 1947; Pistillaria Jeekel et al. 1959 non Fries 1821; Recticoma Scheer 1935; Trichella Léger & Duboscq 1929; Trichellopsis Maessen 1955]
    - Genus Enteromyces Lichtwardt 1961
    - Genus Enteropogon Hibbits 1979 non Nees 1836
    - Genus Leidyomyces Lichtwardt et al. 1999
    - Genus Palavascia Tuzet & Manier 1947 ex Lichtwardt 1964
    - Genus Paramacrinella Manier & Grizel 1971
    - Genus Passalomyces Lichtwardt et al. 1999
    - Genus Ramacrinella Manier & Ormiéres 1962 ex Manier 1968
    - Genus Taeniella Léger & Duboscq 1911
    - Genus Taeniellopsis Poisson 1927
