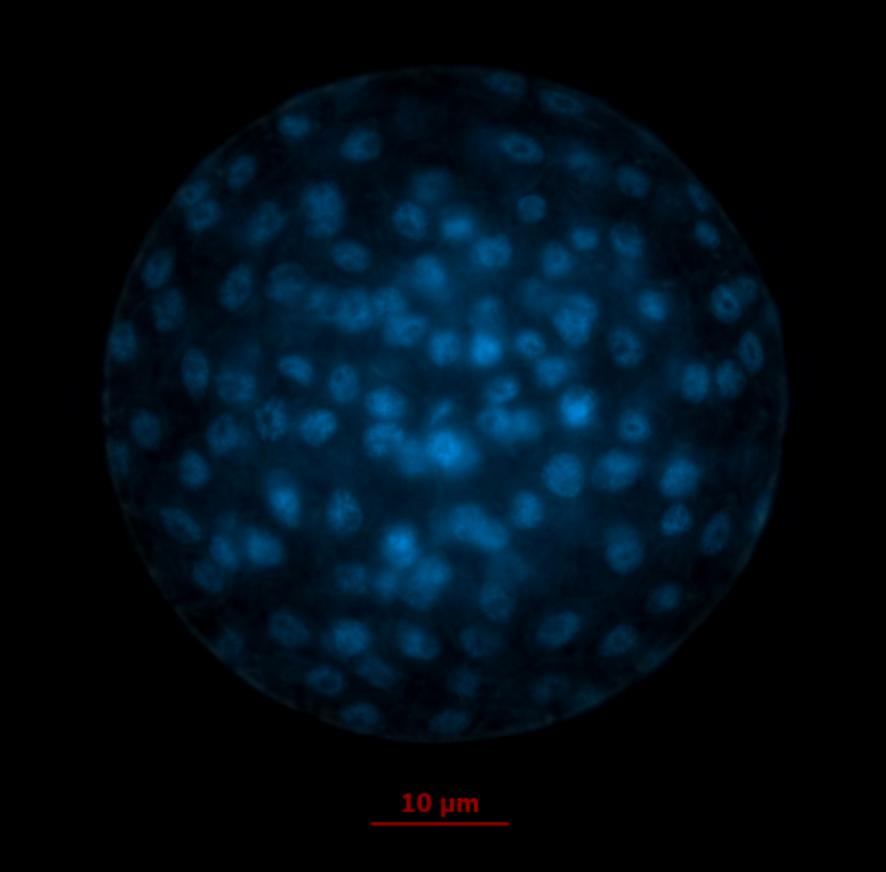
- Pirum gemmata (Ichthyosporea), nuclei stained in blue with DAPI

Scientific classification
- Domain: Eukaryota
- Class: Ichthyosporea
- Order: Eccrinida
- Family: Piridae
- Genus: Pirum; Marshall & Berbee 2010
- Species: P. gemmata

Binomial name
- Pirum gemmata Marshall & Berbee 2010

= Pirum gemmata =

Unicellular species

Pirum gemmata is a unicellular eukaryote that belongs to the Ichthyosporea clade, a group of protists closely related to animals. P. gemmata was isolated from the gut contents of a marine invertebrate, specifically the detritivorous peanut worm Phascolosoma agassizii.

Pirum gemmata’s growth under culture conditions, is through the development of a mature syncytial stage that undergoes sporogenesis and eventually releases endospores through one or more openings in the parent cell wall. Mature cells are multinucleated, with a cell wall, and can measure up to 200 μm. Endospores are amoeboid and some have pseudopod-like cell extensions.

== Taxonomy ==
Pirum gemmata is a member of the Ichthyosporea clade, which is the earliest branching holozoan lineage.
