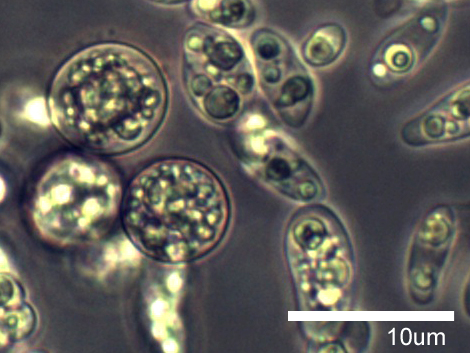
- Amoebidium parasiticum

Scientific classification
- Domain: Eukaryota
- Supergroup: Amorphea
- Clade: Obazoa
- Clade: Opisthokonta
- Clade: Holozoa
- Class: Ichthyosporea
- Order: Ichthyophonida
- Family: Amoebidiaceae
- Genus: Amoebidium; Cienkowski, 1861

Type species
- Amoebidium parasiticum Cienkowski 1861

Species
- A. appalachense; A. australiense; A. colluviei; A. parasiticum; A. recticola

= Amoebidium =

Genus of eukaryotes

Amoebidium is a genus of unicellular, symbiotic eukaryotes in the Opisthokont group Mesomycetozoea, family Amoebidiidae. Amoebidium species attach to the exoskeleton of freshwater aquatic arthropods such as midge larvae and water fleas (Daphnia). The type species is Amoebidium parasiticum, which is also one of the only species to be cultured axenically.

== Etymology ==
Derived from the word "amoeba" to refer to the amoeba-like dispersal cells formed during some stages of the life cycle.

== Description ==
Amoebidium species are single-celled, cigar-shaped or tubular in vegetative growth form (= thallus), and attach to the exoskeleton of various freshwater arthropod hosts (Crustaecea or Insecta) by means of a secreted, glue-like basal holdfast. The thalli are coenocytic (i.e. lack divisions within the cell) and are unbranched. Sexual reproduction is unknown. Asexual reproduction may proceed along two different routes: 1) the entire content of the cell divides into elongated, uninucleate spores (known as sporangiospores or endospores) with the cell wall breaking apart to release the spores or 2) the entire content of the cell divides to produce teardrop-shaped, motile amoeboid cells that disperse for a short time, then encyst and produce spores from the cyst (called cystospores).

== Species ==
There are currently five species that have been named and are differentiated based on the size and shape of the thalli, spores, and dispersal amoebae. Amoebidium parasiticum is the most commonly encountered species in field collections, and appears to have a cosmopolitan distribution with collections from the Czech Republic, Denmark, England, France, Israel, Japan, the Philippines, Poland, Singapore, Spain, Tunisia, and the United States including Puerto Rico. It has also been found in association with a variety of hosts including copepods, amphipods, isopods, mayfly nymphs, and black fly and midge larvae. The other four species (A. appalachense, A. australiense, A. colluviei, and A. recticola) have been collected from limited geographic areas, but it is unclear whether these species truly have a limited distribution or if the observed distribution is an artifact of limited sampling. For example, A. recticola has not been reported in the literature since 1920 and was originally collected from Daphnia living in a reptile tank at the Paris Museum, France.

- A. appalachense Siri, White & Lichtwardt 2006
- A. australiense Lichtwardt & Williams 1992
- A. colluviei Lichtwardt 1988
- A. parasiticum Cienkowski 1861
- A. recticola Chatton 1906

== Culturing ==
Amoebidium parasiticum was the first trichomycete (a group of microscopic fungi and protists found in symbiotic association with aquatic arthropods) to be obtained in axenic culture, allowing for detailed studies of its nutritional requirements, cell wall composition, and conditions that induce amoebagenesis (formation and release of the dispersal amoebae) as well as providing pure tissue for DNA extraction. Several important characteristics were discovered from these studies. Firstly, Amoebidium was originally tentatively placed within kingdom Fungi, but its actual relatedness to fungi was questioned due to the formation of amoeboid cells (a character not observed among fungi). When the cell wall composition of A. parasiticum was analyzed, there was no chitin or cellulose detected, a result that supported the non-relatedness of Amoebidium to fungi. Secondly, experimentation on the nutritional requirements of A. parasiticum lead to the development of various media recipes that enabled the culturing of other trichomycete species. Thirdly, researchers had noted that amoebagenesis appeared to be triggered by ecdysis or death of the host arthropod based on their observations during dissections. Experiments with A. parasiticum cultures supported these observations by showing that amoebagenesis could be induced by incubating Amoebidium thalli with a homogenate of the host (Daphnia) supplemented with various combinations of amino acids and vitamins. Finally, collection of trichomycete DNA for molecular phylogenetic analysis is very challenging due to contaminating DNA from the host, bacteria, and other symbionts and food items residing in the host gut at the time of dissection. Therefore, axenic cultures of trichomycetes are highly valuable for obtaining pure DNA samples. As a result, the phylogenetic position of A. parasiticum was finally resolved in 2000 when molecular phylogenetic analyses showed that it clearly was not related to fungi, but instead belonged with a group of protists in the Mesomycetozoea (at the time referred to as the DRIP clade). Amoebidium appalachense was also obtained in axenic culture, and subsequent molecular analyses supported its relationship with A. parasiticum and other Mesomycetozoea.
