= Trichomycetes =

Group of fungi

Trichomycetes refers to a group of fungi in the division Zygomycota that grow in the guts of arthropods living in aquatic habitats. The name is obsolete, having not been validly published. Species formerly placed in the Trichomycetes are now placed in the orders Harpellales and Asellariales, both in the subdivision Kickxellomycotina, while Amoebidiales and Eccrinales are included in Opisthokonta.
