= Microbiota in Burmese amber =

Fossil resin from the Hukawng Valley, Myanmar

Burmese amber is fossil resin dating to the early Late Cretaceous Cenomanian age recovered from deposits in the Hukawng Valley of northern Myanmar. It is known for being one of the most diverse Cretaceous age amber paleobiotas, containing rich arthropod fossils, along with uncommon vertebrate fossils and even rare marine inclusions. A mostly complete list of all taxa described up to the end of 2023 can be found in Ross (2024).

== Amoebozoa ==
=== Dictyostelia ===
Family	Genus	Species	Authority	Year described	Notes	image
Incertae sedis	†Paleoplastes	†Paleoplastes burmanica	Poinar & Vega	2021	A possible dictyostelid slime mould	

=== Myxogastria ===
Family	Genus	species	Authority	Year described	Notes	image
Stemonotidaceae	Stemonitis	Sp.	N/A	"2019"	A myxogastrid slime mould	Stemonitis species

=== Incertae sedis ===
Family	Genus	Species	Authority	Year described	Notes	image
Incertae sedis	†Endamoebites	†Endamoebites proterus	Poinar	2009	A "Sarcodina" gut Amoebozoa of Kachinitermopsis burmensis	Endamoebites proterus

== Archamoebae ==
=== Entamoebida ===
Family	Genus	Species	Authority	Year described	Notes	image
Entamoebidae	Aff. Endamoeba	Aff. Endamoeba blattae	N/A	2020	A archamoebean Entamoebidae. Associated with Mesoblatta maxi and the ichnotaxon Blattocoprolites blattulidae	

== Apicomplexa ==
=== Aconoidasida ===
==== Haemosporida ====
Family	Genus	Species	Authority	Year described	Notes	image
Plasmodiidae	†Paleohaemoproteus	†Paleohaemoproteus burmacis	Poinar & Telford	2005	A plasmodiid apicomplexan	Paleohaemoproteus burmacis oocyst

=== Conoidasida ===
==== Eugregarinorida ====
Family	Genus	Species	Authority	Year described	Notes	image
Monoductidae	†Primigregarina	†Primigregarina burmanica	Poinar	2010	A eugregarinorid apicomplexen gut protozoan of blattodeans	Primigregarina burmanica

== Ciliophora ==
=== Colpodea ===
==== Entamoebida ====
Family	Genus	Species	Authority	Year described	Notes	image
Colpodida	Aff. Colpodidae	Sp.	N/A	2020	A archamoebean Entamoebidae. Associated with Mesoblatta maxi and the ichnotaxon Blattocoprolites blattulidae	

=== Litostomatea ===
==== Haptorida ====
Family	Genus	Species	Authority	Year described	Notes	image
Spathidiidae	Aff. Spathidium	Sp.	N/A	2020	A litostomatean haptorid. Associated with Mesoblatta maxi.	

=== Nassophorea ===
==== Microthoracida ====
Family	Genus	Species	Authority	Year described	Notes	image
Spathidiidae	Aff. Drepanomonas	Sp.	N/A	2020	A microthoracid Microthoracid. Associated with Mesoblatta maxi.	

== Euglenozoa ==
=== Kinetoplastea ===
==== Trypanosomatida ====
Family	Genus	Species	Authority	Year described	Notes	image
Trypanosomatidae	†Paleoleishmania	†Paleoleishmania proterus	Poinar	2004	A trypanosomatid vector in Palaeomyia burmitis	Paleoleishmania proterus
Trypanosomatidae	†Paleotrypanosoma	†Paleotrypanosoma burmanicus	Poinar	2008	A trypanosomatid vector in Leptoconops nosopheris	Paleotrypanosoma burmanicus in Leptoconops nosopheris saliva

=== Pleurostomatida ===
Family	Genus	Species	Authority	Year described	Notes	image
Litonotidae	Aff. Litonotus	Aff. Litonotus cygnus	N/A	2020	A litostomatean pleurostomatid. Associated with Mesoblatta maxi.	

== Metamonada ==
=== Anaeromonadea ===
==== Oxymonadida ====
Family	Genus	Species	Authority	Year described	Notes	image
Oxymonadidae	†Microrhopalodites	†Microrhopalodites polynucleatis	Poinar	2009	An oxymonadid gut protozoan of Kachinitermopsis burmensis	Microrhopalodites polynucleatis
Oxymonadidae	Oxymonas	†Oxymonas gigantea	Poinar	2009	An oxymonadid gut protozoan of Blattarians	
Oxymonadidae	Oxymonas	†Oxymonas protus	Poinar	2009	An oxymonadid gut protozoan of Kachinitermopsis burmensis	Oxymonas protus
Oxymonadidae	†Oxymonites	†Oxymonites gerus	Poinar	2009	An oxymonadid gut protozoan of Kachinitermopsis burmensis	Oxymonites gerus
Oxymonadidae	†Sauromonites	†Sauromonites katatonis	Poinar	2009	An oxymonadid gut protozoan of Kachinitermopsis burmensis	Sauromonites katatonis
Pyrsonymphidae	†Dinenymphites	Dinenymphites spiris	Poinar	2009	A pyrsonymphid gut protozoan of Kachinitermopsis burmensis	Dinenymphites spiris
Pyrsonymphidae	†Pyrsonymphites	Pyrsonymphites cordylinis	Poinar	2009	A pyrsonymphid gut protozoan of Kachinitermopsis burmensis	Pyrsonymphites cordylinis

=== Trichonymphea ===
==== Trichonymphida ====
Family	Genus	Species	Authority	Year described	Notes	image
†Burmanymphidae	†Burmanymphus	†Burmanymphus cretacea	Poinar	2009	A burmanymphid gut protozoan of Blattarians	
Teranymphidae	†Teranymphites	†Teranymphites rhabdotis	Poinar	2009	A teranymphid gut protozoan of Kachinitermopsis burmensis	Teranymphites rhabdotis
Trichonymphidae	†Trichonymphites	†Trichonymphites henis	Poinar	2009	A trichonymphid gut protozoan of Kachinitermopsis burmensis	Trichonymphites henis

=== Trichomonadea ===
==== Cristamonadida ====
Family	Genus	Species	Authority	Year described	Notes	image
Devescovinidae	†Devescovites	†Devescovites proteus	Poinar	2009	A devescovinid gut protozoan of Blattarians	
Devescovinidae	†Foainites	†Foainites icelus	Poinar	2009	A devescovinid gut protozoan of Blattarians	

==== Spirotrichonymphida ====
Family	Genus	Species	Authority	Year described	Notes	image
Holomastigotidae	†Spiromastigites	†Spiromastigites acanthodes	Poinar	2009	A holomastigotid gut protozoan of Kachinitermopsis burmensis	Spiromastigites acanthodes

==== Trichomonadida ====
Family	Genus	Species	Authority	Year described	Notes	image
incertae sedis	†Paleotrichomones	†Paleotrichomones burmanicus	Poinar	2009	A trichomonadid gut protozoan of Blattarians	

== Mollicutes ==
=== Entomoplasmatales ===
Family	Genus	Species	Authority	Year described	Notes	image
Spiroplasmataceae	Spiroplasma	†Spiroplasma burmanica	Poinar	2020	A symbiotix helical bacteria. Hosted by an Alloeopterus anomeotarsus psyllid	

== "Opisthokonta" ==
=== Mesomycetozoea ===
==== Eccrinales ====
Family	Genus	Species	Authority	Year described	Notes	image
Eccrinidae	†Paleocadus	†Paleocadus burmiticus	Poinar	2016	An eccrinacious Opisthokont	

== Proteobacteria ==
=== Alphaproteobacteria ===
==== Rickettsiales ====
Family	Genus	Species	Authority	Year described	Notes	image
Rickettsiaceae	†Palaeorickettsia	†Palaeorickettsia protera	Poinar	2014	A Rickettsiaceae in Cornupalpatum burmanicum vector	Palaeorickettsia protera
