= Monocercomonoides exilis =

Scientific classification
- Domain: Eukaryota
- Supergroup: Metamonada
- Phylum: Preaxostyla
- Order: Oxymonadida
- Family: Polymastigidae
- Genus: Monocercomonoides
- Species: M. exilis

Binomial name
- Monocercomonoides exilis Nie, 1950

Species of metamonad

Monocercomonoides exilis is a species of single celled eukaryote belonging to the oxymonads, a group of flagellated protists that live in the gastrointestinal tracts of animals. It is a bacterivorous organism found in the intestinal tract of rodents, including guinea pigs and chinchillas. It was the first eukaryotic organism found that lacks mitochondria or mitochondrial related organelles.

== History ==
Monocercomonoides exilis was first described from the digestive tract of guinea pigs in 1950. Early studies on Monocercomonoides species were based largely on light microscopy and suspected host species, so speciation was often unclear. In 1993, a strain of Monocercomonoides, designated Monocercomonoides strain PA203, was isolated from a chinchilla.

== Absence of mitochondria ==
Mitochondria are organelles found in nearly all eukaryotes. Some anaerobic eukaryotes have reduced mitochondria related organelles, such as hydrogenosomes or mitosomes, which retain some mitochondrial functions. M. exilis is unusual in that it lacks any form of mitochondrial related organelle.
