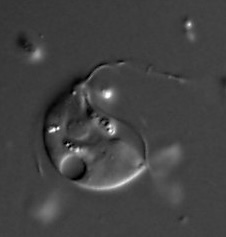
- Light microscopy image of Paratrimastix pyriformis

Scientific classification
- Domain: Eukaryota
- Supergroup: Metamonada
- Phylum: Preaxostyla
- Order: Paratrimastigida
- Family: Paratrimastigidae
- Genus: Paratrimastix
- Species: P. pyriformis

Binomial name
- Paratrimastix pyriformis (Klebs, 1893)

Synonyms
- Trimastix pyriformis; Tetramitus pyriformis

= Paratrimastix pyriformis =

Species of protists

Paratrimastix pyriformis is a species of free-living (non-parasitic) anaerobic freshwater bacteriovorous flagellated protist formerly known as Trimastix pyriformis and Tetramitus pyriformis.

== History of knowledge ==
This species was first described by G. A. Klebs in 1892 as Tetramitus pyriformis. Under this name, it has been frequently discussed in the context of sewage, sewage treatment, and water quality during the 20th century. It was also observed on Elephant Island, South Shetland Islands. More than 100 years after its description, in 1999, it was transferred to the genus Trimastix based on its morphology. The first ultrastructural study using transmission electron microscopy was published the same year, which reported a discovery of hydrogenosome-like organelles in the species.

A molecular phylogenetic study based on small-subunit ribosomal RNA placed the genus Trimastix (then including P. pyriformis) as sister to the oxymonad Pyrsonympha in 2001 and a close relationship to oxymonads was further supported in another study in 2005. The clade uniting Trimastix and oxymonads was named Preaxostyla in 2003. A more detailed molecular phylogenetic analysis in 2015 placed this species in a new genus Paratrimastix, even more closely related to oxymonads than Trimastix. Preaxostyla (consisting of Trimastix, Paratrimastix, and oxymonads) is now considered one of the five major lineages of Metamonada.

The interest in P. pyriformis, and especially its reduced mitochondria, was largely driven by the possibility that oxymonads might be completely amitochondrial. This was supported by a genomic analysis of Monocercomonoides exilis published in 2016, which demonstrated that this oxymonad is the first known eukaryote that has completely lost its mitochondria.

A series of transcriptomic studies between the years 2006 and 2016 reported details of P. pyriformis glycolytic pathway and arginine deiminase pathway, as well as supported the mitochondrial ancestry of its hydrogenosome-like organelles and uncovered their role in amino acid metabolism. Preliminary results of a genomic project led to the characterization of the unusual preaxostylan type iron-sulfur cluster assembly machinery in P. pyriformis in 2018, the role of its reduced mitochondria in the methionine cycle (2022), and the experimental characterization of one of its mitochondrial carriers (2023). The complete genomic assembly of P. pyriformis was published in 2023 in a large-scale comparative genomic study focused on the reductive evolution of mitochondria in Preaxostyla, which also identified two additional oxymonad species with no traces of mitochondria.

== Morphology and ultrastructure ==
Paratrimastix pyriformis has four flagella, one directed anteriorly, one posteriorly, and others laterally. The posterior flagellum has two vanes with thickened vane margins. Both vanes have a paracrystalline substructure. Ventral side of the cell is shaped in the form of a broad groove, a typical excavate feature, which is used as a feeding structure. The cells measure 9-17 μm in length and 5-13 μm in width. The single nucleus with a conspicuous central nucleolus is located in the anterior third of the cell.

Dense network of rough endoplasmic reticulum extends from the nucleus towards the posterior end of the cell. A single stacked Golgi apparatus is located posterior and to the left of the basal bodies. The kinetid consists of four basal bodies, four microtubular roots, and various microtubules and fibers associated with the basal bodies and roots. The arrangement of the basal bodies is asymmetrical. Rod-shaped mitochondrion-related organelles resembling hydrogenosomes are 0.5-1.0 μm in length and bounded by a double membrane. The mitochondrion-related organelles are dispersed throughout the cell.

Paratrimastix pyriformis may be distinguished from the marine Trimastix marina and the freshwater Paratrimastix eleionoma by the non-thickened and discretely subapically inserting anterior flagellum, from Trimastix inaequalis by the equal length of its lateral flagella, and from Trimastix convexa (most similar species) by its smaller size and ultrastructural details of the cytoskeleton.

== Behaviour ==
Paratrimastix pyriformis swims with the anterior and lateral flagella beating and rotates occasionally. It can attach to the substrate by the tip of the posterior flagellum. Its cell contains food vacuoles with bacteria. A small contractile vacuole is located posteriorly. Bacteria are captured at the posterior end of the ventral groove. Flagella are retained throughout cell division. Some, but not all, strains of P. pyriformis produce cysts: rounded cells with thin walls and basal bodies and flagella preserved.

== Metabolism ==
Glycolysis in P. pyriformis includes at least four alternative enzymes that have likely been gained by lateral gene transfer from Bacteria. P. pyriformis further produces additional ATP using the extended glycolysis pathway where pyruvate generated in glycolysis is metabolised into acetate, CO_{2}, and H_{2}. Alternatively, pyruvate can be produced by decarboxylation of malate through the activity of the malic enzyme (ME). Pyruvate is decarboxylated to acetyl coenzyme A by pyruvate:ferredoxin oxidoreductase (PFO). The last part of the pathway, which yields ATP, acetate, and coenzyme A is catalyzed by a single enzyme: acetyl-CoA synthetase (ACS) like in the diplomonad Giardia intestinalis. Activities of both ME and PFO produce excess electrons which are then consumed in reduction of protons to molecular hydrogen through the activity of [FeFe] hydrogenases.

Based on an in-silico reconstructed amino acid metabolism, P. pyriformis is able to synthesize at least five protein-forming amino acids including selenocysteine. Unlike other Preaxostyla, P. pyriformis doesn't have a complete arginine deiminase pathway, and therefore is likely unable to produce ATP via arginine catabolism. However, other amino acids (cysteine, serine, tryptophan, and methionine) can hypothetically be utilized to produce ATP by their conversion of pyruvate and α-keto-butyrate, which can enter the extended glycolytic pathway.
