= Saccinobaculus =

Scientific classification
- Domain: Eukaryota
- Clade: Metamonada
- Phylum: Preaxostyla
- Order: Oxymonadida
- Family: Saccinobaculidae
- Genus: Saccinobaculus; Cleveland et al. 1934

Type species
- Saccinobaculus ambloaxostylus Cleveland et al. 1934

Species
- S. ambloaxostylus; S. gloriosus; S. lata; S. minor; S. scabiosus; S. spatiatus

Genus of unicellular eukaryotes

Saccinobaculus (/ˌsæksɪnoʊˈbækjʊləs/ SAK-sin-oh-BAK-yuul-əs) is a genus of unicellular eukaryotes that resides in the hindgut of the wood-feeding cockroach Cryptocercus punctulatus. This genus is known for its distinctive movement that resembles a snake trashing in a bag. The genus is involved in the digestion of wood materials within its insect-host and is vertically transmitted to insect progeny. The genus is the part of the family Saccinobaculidae.

== Etymology ==
The name for the genus is derived from the Latin noun saccus which denotes sack or bag and the Latin noun baculus that denotes stick. The genus is named for its characteristic movement which resembles a snake thrashing in a bag.

== History of knowledge ==
Saccinobacculus was first described by Cleveland and colleagues in 1934 while observing the hindgut of wood-feeding cockroach Cryptocercus punctulatus. Cleveland and his colleagues suggested that there were at least three species of Saccinobacculus present in the hindgut of C. punctulatus; S. ambloaxostylus, S. doroaxostylus and S. minor. However, Cleveland reassigned two species of the genus, S. doroaxostylus and S. minor, to the genus Oxymonas upon revisiting their life cycles and behaviour in 1950. Molecular data collected by Heiss and Keeling in 2006 supported the original placement of these two species in the genus Saccinobacculus.

== Habitat and ecology ==
Saccinobaculus is a genus of symbiotic flagellates that live exclusively in the hindgut of the wood-feeding cockroach Cryptocercus punctulatus. Saccinobaculus is found in great numbers and diversity in the hindgut of C. punctulatus and plays a role in the digestion of wood materials that the insect-host feeds on. The mode of nutrition and the specific role of Saccinobaculus in the digestion of wood materials within its insect-host remains poorly understood. This may be due to its resistance to cultivation in a laboratory settings.

== Description ==
=== Morphology ===
The size of the cells within the genus range from 14 to 170 micrometres in length and 7 to 46 micrometers in width. Unlike other anaerobic flagellates, members of the genus Saccinobaculus rarely contain bacterial symbionts on their surface. Some species of Saccinobacculus have evenly-distributed concavities on their surface. The shape of the cell is variable and can take the form of a sphere to an elongated rod. The variability of the cell shape is due to the continuous movement of the axostyle of the cell, an undulating ribbon-like structure consisting of microtubules running along the length of the cell. The axostyle propels the cell in a zig-zag manner that resembles a snake trashing in a bag. The cells may have 4, 8 or 12 flagella on the anterior end with 4 being the most common number. The flagella contribute little to the cell's locomotion as the cell is primarily propelled by its axostyle. The flagella are connected to a pair of basal bodies and emerge at the anterior end of the axostyle. The nucleus is rounded and also associated with the anterior end of the axostyle. Similar to other oxymonads, Saccinobaculus lacks mitochondria and Golgi bodies. Furthermore, the cell has no attachment apparatus (i.e. a holdfast) or an anterior cell extension (i.e. a rostellum).

=== Life cycles ===
Saccinobaculus is observed to have both sexual and asexual life cycles. Sexual reproduction only occurs around the time when the insect-host is molting and is triggered by hormones from the insect's prothoracic glands. About a week before the insect host molts, Saccinobaculus produces gametes from a haploid cell through a single mitotic division of the nucleus and cytoplasm. Immediately after the gametes are formed, they unite to begin the process of fertilization. The fertilized cell contains all the nuclear and organellar materials from both gametes until the onset of meiosis, which occurs 24 hours after the insect-host molts and triggers the digestion of one flagellum and one centriole from one gamete and the axostyles of both gametes. After meiosis is complete, the remaining centriole duplicates producing new flagella and axostyles. In mitotic cell division, only the axostyle is digested and renewed. There are some subtle differences in sexual reproduction between Saccinobaculus species.

=== Genetics ===
Similar to other oxymonads, Saccinobaculus has a small subunit ribosomal RNA (SSU rRNA) sequence that is longer than the average eukaryote. Genetic data from the SSU rRNA has been integral in supporting the assignment of the species S. doroaxostylus and S. minor to the genus.

== List of species ==
- S. ambloaxostylus Cleveland et al. 1934
- S. gloriosus Bobyleva 1973
- S. lata Cleveland 1950b
- S. minor Cleveland et al. 1934
- S. scabiosus Bobyleva 1973
- S. spatiatus Bobyleva 1973
