= Anthroponosis =

Anthroponosis may refer to:

- Human-to-human transmission
- Reverse zoonosis
