= Sapronosis =

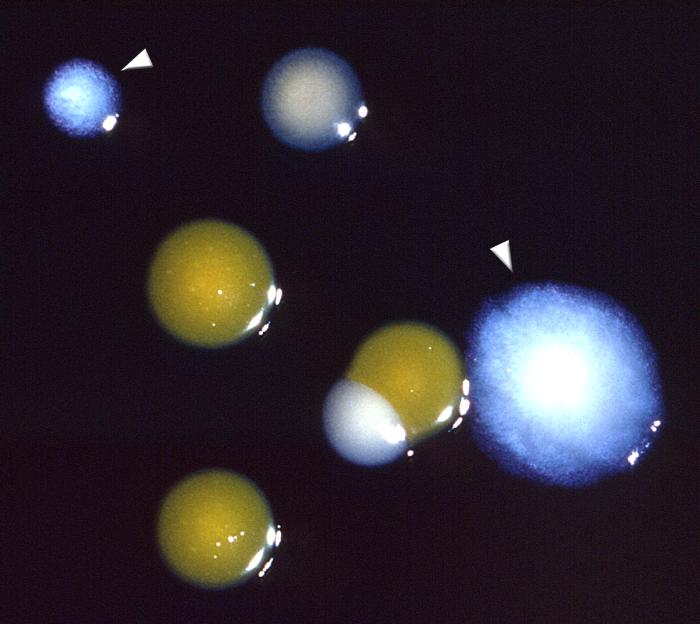
Colonies of the bacterial sapronosis Legionella pneumophila

A sapronosis is an infectious disease caused by an organism that is able to live and reproduce in the soil or an other abiotic environment, and infects a living host directly from that environment. One widely-known example of a sapronosis is Legionnaires' disease. Approximately a third of all known disease organisms are sapronoses. Almost all fungal infections are sapronoses, but there are no known sapronotic viruses.

Occupation often plays a role in sapronoses: people working with the soil, such as farmers or gardeners, are often at particularly high risk. Sporotrichosis, a fungal sapronosis, is for example sometimes known as "rose handler's disease".

Sapronoses pose unique public health challenges. Because they can persist in the environment outside of any living host, they are difficult to control or eradicate. Their spread is also not subject to threshold host density. Sapronotic outbreaks are typically caused by a common source material, can be stopped by removing that material. For example, an outbreak of sporotrichosis that affected more than 3000 South African miners was stopped by removing wood in which the fungus was living.

== Terminology and classification ==
The term "sapronosis" was coined by the Russian microbiologist Vasiliy Ilyich Terskikh in 1958, who contested the then-widespread idea that pathogenic bacteria could not persist in the environment outside of a host.

Sapronoses sometimes serve as one part of the three-part classification of infectious diseases; the other two parts are anthroponoses (spread mostly from human to human) and zoonoses (spread mostly from animals to humans). In contrast to those, the primary reservoir of a sapronosis is in the soil. Sapronoses are therefore sometimes distinguished from environmental pathogens, also called "saprozoonoses", which have one part of their life cycle in the soil and one part in an animal host.

Typical examples of sapronotic agents are fungal such as coccidioidomycosis, histoplasmosis, aspergillosis, cryptococcosis, Microsporum gypseum. Some can be bacterial from the sporulating clostridium and bacillus to Rhodococcus equi, Burkholderia pseudomallei, Listeria, Erysipelothrix, Yersinia pseudotuberculosis, legionellosis, Pontiac fever, and nontuberculous mycobacterioses. Other sapronotic agents are amebic as in primary amebic meningoencephalitis. Yet again, difficulties in classification arise in the case of sporulating bacteria whose infectious spores are only produced after a significant period of inactive vegetative growth within an abiotic environment, yet this is still considered a case of sapronoses.

== See also ==
- Zoonosis
- Reverse zoonosis
