= Mark van der Giezen =

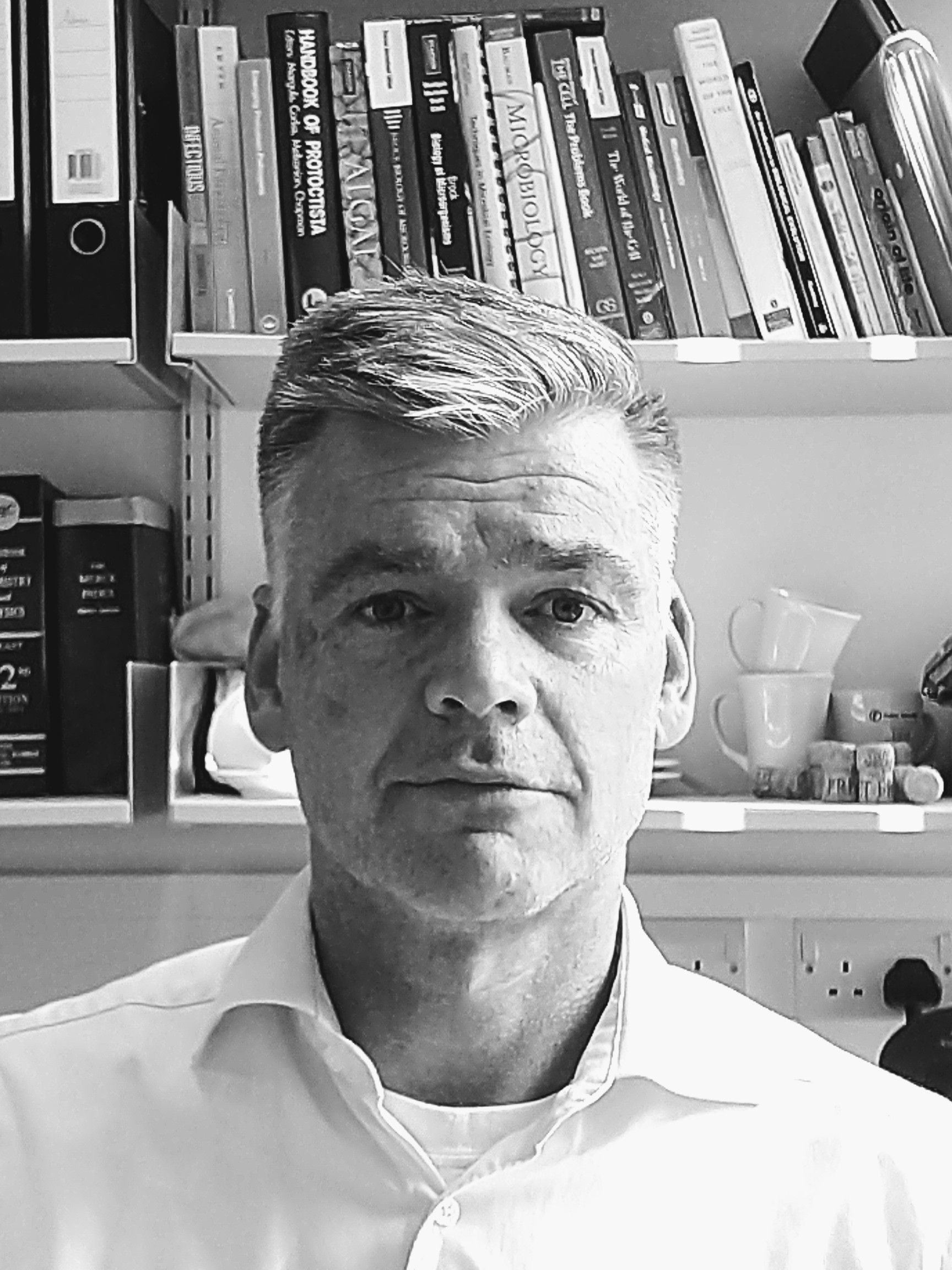
- Born: May 24, 1968 (age 58)
- Education: University of Groningen
- Known for: Mitosomes, mitochondria, hydrogenosomes
- Scientific career
- Fields: Microbiology
- Workplaces: University of Stavanger, University of Exeter, Queen Mary University of London, Royal Holloway University of London, Natural History Museum of London
- Doctoral advisor: Rudolf Prins

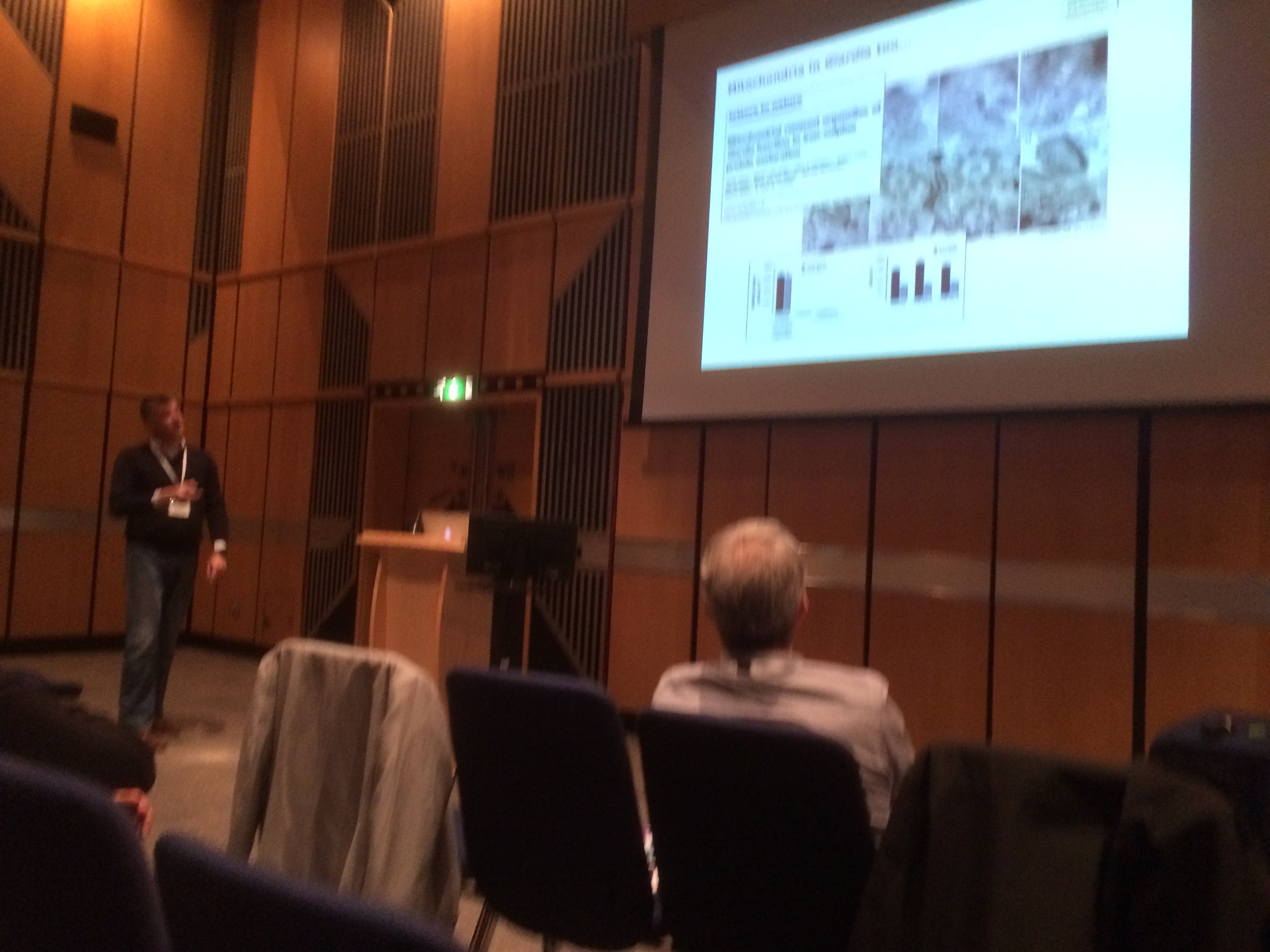
Giezen in Birmingham, 2015

Mark van der Giezen is Professor of Biological Chemistry, Centre for Organelle Research, University of Stavanger, Norway. He holds Dutch nationality and is married with three children.

== Early life and education ==
Van der Giezen was born on 24 May 1968. His primary and secondary education was in Assen, The Netherlands. He studied biology, with graduate-level molecular genetics and immunology, at the University of Groningen, remaining to obtain a PhD in 1997 in mathematical and natural sciences, supervised by Rudolf Prins, in the Department of Microbiology. His PhD thesis was entitled The evolutionary origin of fungal hydrogenosomes.

== Career ==
From October 1997 to March 2002, van der Giezen was an EMBO Fellow in the group of Martin Embley at the Department of Zoology of the Natural History Museum of London, UK.

From April 2002 to October 2004, he was a post-doctoral researcher in the group of Jorge Tovar at the School of Biological Sciences, Royal Holloway, University of London, UK.

In November 2004 van der Giezen became lecturer in microbiology in the School of Biological Sciences, Queen Mary, University of London, UK.

In September 2007 he moved to the University of Exeter, UK, as senior lecturer in evolutionary biochemistry, becoming associate professor of evolutionary biochemistry in January 2019.

In August 2019 van der Giezen moved to Norway, and to the post of Professor of Biological Chemistry in the University of Stavanger.

=== Scientific achievements ===
Van der Giezen has published extensively in his field of research and made over 50 contributions as external seminars and lectures at international scientific meetings.

Van der Giezen investigates adaptations of microbial eukaryotes to life under anoxia, or low oxygen. He discovered mitochondrial remnants (mitosomes) in the human intestinal parasite Giardia intestinalis, an organism until then considered to be one of the most primitive eukaryotes. This discovery called for re-assessment of the evolution of mitochondria.

Van der Giezen's research has demonstrated that several unusual organelles are in fact mitochondria. More recently, he has conducted large dataset analyses of microbial eukaryotes. His current work includes next-generation sequencing projects, and he is involved in several eukaryotic genome projects. He annotated and curated 10% of the Emiliania huxleyi genome and other genomes are currently in progress including crustacean and fish parasite genomes. Most recently, van der Giezen has been involved in sequencing the genome of the most common microbial eukaryote found in human intestines. He uses large-scale RNA-Seq analyses for protists that are difficult to culture.

== Honours ==
- 2018 Senior Fellow of the Higher Education Academy.
- 2014 Elected Fellow of the Linnean Society of London.
- 2009 Visiting Scholar at the Institute for Protein Research, University of Osaka, Japan.
- 2002 – present. Seven publications selected by the Faculty of 1000 with an average score above ‘exceptional’.
- 1998 Fellow of the European Molecular Biology Organisation.
