= Eric Bertherat =

Swiss edpidemiologist

Eric Bertherat is a medical officer at the World Health Organization's Department of Epidemic and Pandemic Alert and Response, in the Communicable Diseases secretariat. Bertherat's home base is in Geneva. His activities focus on the plague and epidemic meningitis.

== Selected scientific biography ==
Bertherat has written extensively on the plague. In fact he is a principal investigator.

Bertherat stressed in 2011 that the "rapid onset and high lethality are (the pneumonic plague)'s only distinguishable clinical features as the disease otherwise manifests itself as a severe respiratory infection that could be caused by various pathogens." To isolate and contain Yersinia pestis necessitated modifications in diagnostic strategies; "trained personnel for quality specimen collection and appropriate specimen handling and preservation" were required for confirmation of this particular disease outbreak in the Democratic Republic of the Congo. Bertherat wrote that:

Pneumonic plague is of serious concern because of the potential for human-to-human transmission from aerosolized bacteria spread through coughing. Pneumonic plague can lead to localized outbreaks, or even devastating epidemics, because the infectious dose by inhalation can be as low as 100–500 organisms.
