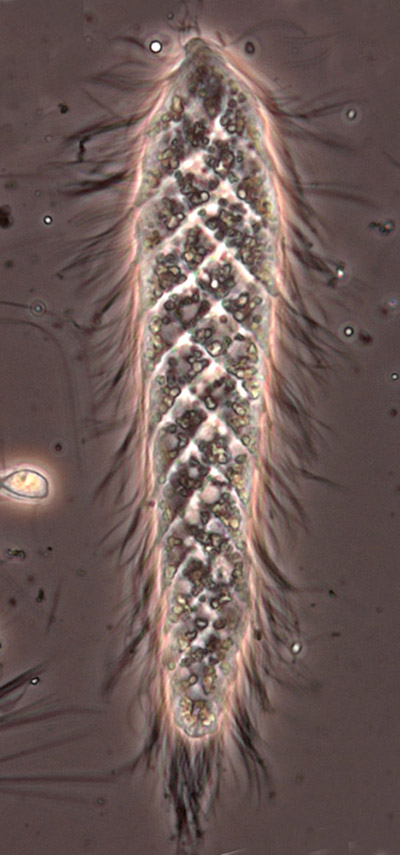
- Dinenympha from Reticulotermes termite, light micrograph of living cell

Scientific classification
- Domain: Eukaryota
- (unranked): incertae sedis
- Clade: Metamonada
- Phylum: Preaxostyla
- Order: Oxymonadida
- Family: Pyrsonymphidae
- Genus: Dinenympha; Leidy 1877

Type species
- Dinenympha gracilis Leidy, 1877

Species
- See text

Synonyms
- Pyrsonympha (Dinenympha) (Leidy 1877) Koidzumi 1921

= Dinenympha =

Genus of flagellated protists

Dinenympha is a genus of excavates.

It includes the species Dinenympha exilis.

== Species ==
List of Dinenympha species.

- Dinenympha aculeata Georgevitch 1951
- Dinenympha aviformis Georgevitch 1951
- Dinenympha exilis Koidzumi 1921
- Dinenympha fimbriata Kirby 1924
- Dinenympha gracilis Leidy 1877
- Dinenympha leidyi Koidzumi 1921
- Dinenympha mukundai Mukherjee & Maiti 1989
- Dinenympha nobilis Koidzumi 1921
- Dinenympha parva Koidzumi 1921
- Dinenympha porteri Koidzumi 1921
- Dinenympha rayi Mukherjee & Maiti 1989
- Dinenympha rugosa Koidzumi 1921
