= Mastigella =

Scientific classification
- Domain: Eukaryota
- Phylum: Amoebozoa
- Class: Archamoebae
- Order: Mastigamoebida
- Family: Mastigamoebidae
- Genus: Mastigella Johannes Frenzel, 1897

Genus of amoeba

Mastigella is an amoeboid genus belonging to Amoebozoa.
