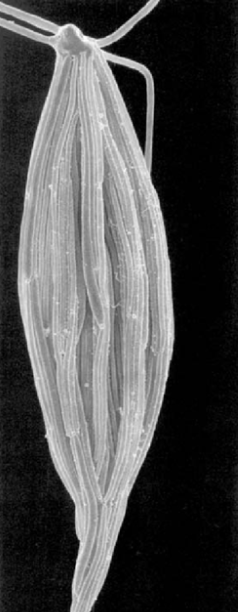

Scientific classification
- Domain: Eukaryota
- (unranked): incertae sedis
- Clade: Metamonada
- Phylum: Preaxostyla
- Order: Oxymonadida
- Family: Streblomastigidae; Kofoid & Swezy, 1920
- Genus: Streblomastix; Kofoid & Swezy, 1920

Type species
- Streblomastix strix Kofoid & Swezy, 1920

Species
- Streblomastix strix

= Streblomastix =

Genus of eukaryotes

A symbiotic eukaryote that lives in the hindgut of termites, Streblomastix is a protist associated with a community of ectosymbiotic bacteria.

== Movement ==
Streblomastix strix moves by beating its anterior flagella. When cells move forward, they usually rotate counterclockwise, during which time the flagella point backward; while during the reverse movement, the flagella point forward.

Streblomastix strix is able to move directionally toward sodium acetate (its presumed food source) (chemotaxis). Studies have shown that the bacteria covering its surface act as sensory symbionts, receiving environmental signals and transmitting them to the host to guide its movement.

== Morphology ==
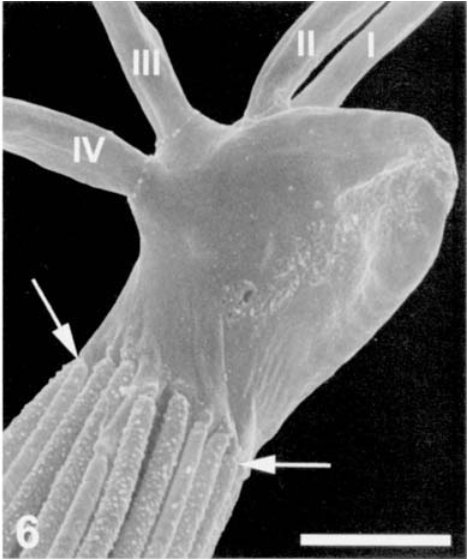
Lateral SEM of the anterior end of the cell highlighting the ‘two-paired’ organization and anterior orientation of the four flagella.

These protists measure around 100 micrometers in length. The axostyle in Streblomastix strix exhibits a significant evolutionary divergence from the motile, contractile axostyles typical of many oxymonads. They completely lack mitochondria and Golgi apparatus.They have Club-shaped body

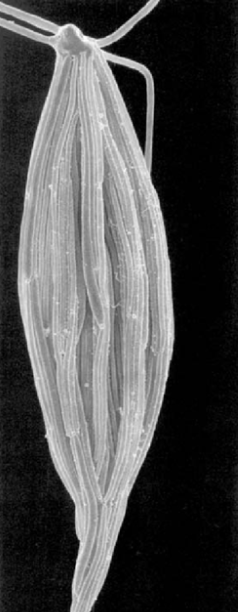
SEM of a spindle-shaped cell showing four anterior flagella and a dense community of elongated epibiotic bacteria over the host cell surface (Bar = 5 μm).

with a naked anterior end, which is used to attached to the gut surface of termites.The surface of the cell features longitudinal ridges separated by deep furrows. Unlike the axostyle inside the cell, these extended ridges structures are completely lacking in microtubule support.The organism possesses four flagella, which are used for locomotion.

In cross-section, the cell's has a stellate, or star-shaped, form with ectosymbiotic bacteria surround them. Except for the anterior region, the surface of Steblomastix strix is almost entirely covered with long, rod-shaped epibiotic bacteria. These bacteria are arranged end-to-end along the longitudinal lamina.The bacteria do not attach randomly, but are anchored via specialized "biconcave knots" on the host cell membrane. These knots precisely accommodate the ends of adjacent bacteria, forming stable connections.

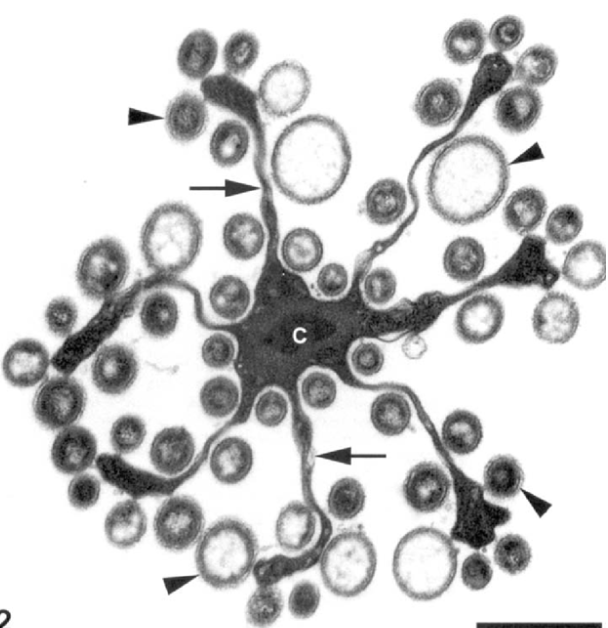
TEM transverse section showing the stellate morphology of the host cell. The host was organized as a central core (c) with seven thin vanes radiating outward (arrows).

These epiphytic bacteria may act as the host's extracellular skeleton. When antibiotics are used to remove the bacteria, Streblomastix strix loses its star-shaped and elongated form, transforming into a teardrop-shaped structure, indicating that its morphology is highly dependent on the support of the symbiotic bacteria.

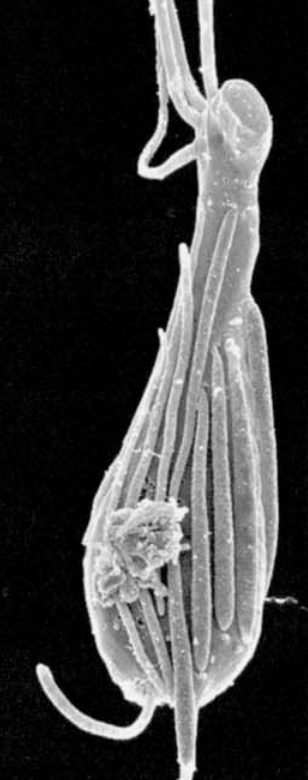
SEM of a teardrop-shaped cell after three days of carbenecillin treatment (Bar = 2.5 μm).

== Habitat ==
Streblomastix strix is found only in the hindgut of dampwood termites, particularly in the genus Zootermopsis of the family Termopsidae.

Within the termite hindgut, Streblomastix strix primarily concentrates in the vestibule, a spherical chamber located posterior to the junction of the midgut and hindgut. They also attach to the walls of the enlarged hindgut chamber or its surrounding space. They uses its specialized "holdfast" at its anterior end to firmly attach itself to the chitinous inner wall of the termite hindgut.Unlike most strictly anaerobic microorganisms in the termite's hint gut, Streblomastix strix is oxygen-tolerant and tends to inhabit areas containing trace amounts of oxygen.

== Metabolism ==
Streblomastix strix is a anaerobic protist whose metabolic capacity has been highly simplified during evolution, relying instead on external symbionts. Lacking the ability to degrade lignocellulose, they depend on symbiotic bacteria on their cell surface to break down lignocellulose into monosaccharides, and then take up these sugars through various sugar transporters encoded in their genome. The ingested sugars are metabolized through extended glycolysis and fermentation. The main metabolic end products are acetate, ethanol, hydrogen (H₂), and carbon dioxide (CO₂). These products (especially acetate) are excreted into the termite gut, becoming the termites' primary carbon source.

Streblomastix strix cannot synthesize purine or pyrimidine nucleotides, nor can it synthesize most essential amino acids and cofactors. It must obtain these substances from the environment or by digesting symbiotic bacteria.

The bacterial community epiphytic on the surface of Streblomastix strix can be divided into two categories. One category can degrade lignocellulose; these bacteria possess a complex set of glycosyl hydrolases (GHs) capable of breaking down cellulose and hemicellulose into monosaccharides. Some symbiotic bacteria (such as Ca. O. streblomastigis) possess the nitrogenase gene (nifHDK), enabling nitrogen fixation, converting nitrogen gas into ammonia, and further synthesizing amino acids.

Genomic analysis revealed that most members of the epiphytic bacterial community lack enolase, a key enzyme in the glycolysis pathway. This means that these bacteria cannot independently convert carbohydrates into pyruvate, and therefore cannot produce adenosine triphosphate. To maintain the survival of the symbiotic bacteria, Streblomastixstrix is thought to intervene in bacterial metabolism. Enolase exchange hypothesis suggests an exchange of metabolic intermediates between the host and bacteria.The host may receive glycero-2-phosphate from the bacteria, convert it into phosphoenolpyruvate, and then return it to the bacteria; or the host may directly provide pyruvate to the bacteria.

== Genetic code ==
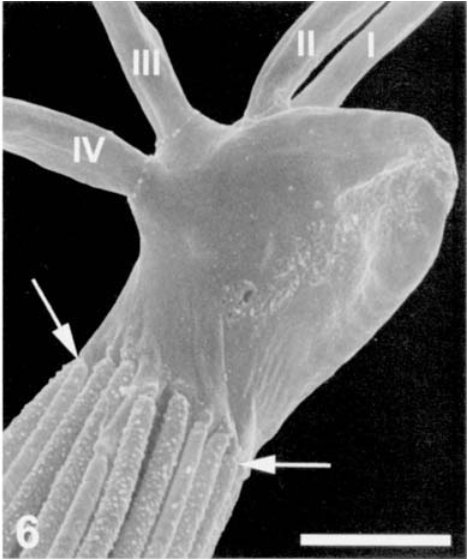

The nuclear genome of Streblomastix strix utilizes a non-canonical genetic code. Specifically, the codons TAA and TAG are reassigned to encode glutamine, whereas they function as stop codons in the standard genetic code. Consequently, TGA serves as the sole functional stop codon in this organism. Streblomastix strix represents the fifth eukaryotic lineage known to exhibit this specific deviation from the standard code.

== Reprodution and life cycle ==
Streblomastix strix reproduces asexually through longitudinal binary fission. Its nuclear division is a closed-type mitosis, during which an intranuclear spindle is formed. During division, the parental axostyle depolymerizes.

According to early descriptions, the cell becomes elongated, untwisted, and loses its characteristic longitudinal ridges during division. Most notably, the symbiotic bacteria attached to the cell surface appear to temporarily detach or disappear during this process through an unknown mechanism.

Because Streblomastix strix is an obligate gut symbiont and cannot survive in environments outside the host, the persistence of its population depends entirely on vertical transmission. When the host termite molts, the gut shed off, and Streblomastix strix is cleared along with it. After molting, termites must feed proctodelly, ingesting intestinal fluid secreted by other termites in the nest to reacquire Streblomastix strix and other symbiotic microorganisms.

When the host termite prepares to reproduce and develop into alate for dispersal, the gut environment undergoes dramatic changes. During adult eclosion, Streblomastix strix transforms from its typical elongated, star-shaped form into a rounded shape. This morphological change is interpreted as a strategy to enhance resilience, enabling it to withstand the gut environmental stresses associated with the host's physiological changes and ensuring successful transmission to the next generation of hosts.
