= Trimastix =

Scientific classification
- Domain: Eukaryota
- Supergroup: Metamonada
- Phylum: Preaxostyla
- Order: Trimastigida; Cavalier-Smith, 2003
- Family: Trimastigidae; Kent, 1880
- Genus: Trimastix; Kent, 1880

Type species
- Trimastix marina Kent, 1880

Species
- Trimastix cionae; Trimastix elaverinus; Trimastix inaequalis; Trimastix marina

Synonyms
- Elvirea Parona Corrado 1886

Genus of excavates

Trimastix is a genus of excavate protists, the sole occupant of the order Trimastigida. Trimastix are bacterivorous, free living and anaerobic. It was first observed in 1881 by William Kent. There are few known species, and the genus's role in the ecosystem is largely unknown. However, it is known that they generally live in marine environments within the tissues of decaying organisms to maintain an anoxic environment. Much interest in this group is related to its close association with other members of Preaxostyla. These organisms do not have classical mitochondria, and as such, much of the research involving these microbes is aimed at investigating the evolution of mitochondria.

A freshwater flagellate of similar morphology used to be included in this genus as Trimastix pyriformis, but was moved to Paratrimastix in 2015.

== Taxonomy ==
- Order Trimastigida Cavalier-Smith 2003
  - Family Trimastigidae Saville Kent 1880
    - Genus Trimastix Saville Kent 1880
      - Species Trimastix cionae (Parona Corrado 1886) Grassé 1952 [Elvirea cionae Parona Corrado 1886]
      - Species Trimastix elaverinus Dumas 1930
      - Species Trimastix inaequalis Bernard, Simpson & Patterson 2000
      - Species Trimastix marina Kent 1880

== History of knowledge ==
Trimastix were first described by William Kent in 1881 when he observed a Trimastix cell in a sample sourced from decaying fuci seaweed. He described the genus at the time as free-swimming naked animalcules that are oval, or pear shaped, with a membranous border and three flagella inserted on the anterior end. Kent observed one flagellum facing forwards and two facing backwards. It was also noted in this account that Trimastix had a visually apparent nucleus and contractile vacuole but no visual oral aperture. Kent determined that Trimastix was a distinct genus, despite similarities to Dallingeria, because of the lateral border he observed which was not present in Dallingeria.

It was later determined that the lateral border Kent was referring to was in fact the oral aperture of Trimastix, which also contained a fourth flagella. Today, the morphology of Trimastix is better understood, including details not initially observed by Kent, such as Trimastix lacking a conventional mitochondrion. Current research indicates that despite there being no evidence that the organelle can produce ATP, there are certain mitochondrial functions that it appears to have maintained.

== Habitat and ecology ==
Trimastix can only survive in anaerobic habitats, but unlike many anaerobes without typical mitochondria, Trimastix are not parasitic. Trimastix instead consume bacteria through their ventral groove. In order to maintain an anoxic environment without parasitism or endosymbiosis, Trimastix are most often found inside the tissues of dead and decaying marine vegetation.

== Morphology and ultrastructure ==
Trimastix cells are oblong broad anteriorly and taper posteriorly. Trimastix is 20 μm long and 8 μm wide. A kinetid of four flagella is located on the anterior end of the cell with one flagella anteriorly oriented, two flagella posteriorly oriented, and the fourth flagella sitting within an oral groove on the ventral side. Trimastix have one anterior pear-shaped nucleus that contains a large nucleolus.

Trimastix species do not have typical aerobic mitochondria, but they do have remnants of an ancestral mitochondrion, in the form of a hydrogenosome- or mitosome-like organelle. There is no evidence this organelle produces ATP. The organelle still appears to be targeted by proteins involved in amino acid metabolism, transport and maturation of proteins, and transport of metabolites so it likely retains some mitochondrial function relating to those areas.
