= Bacterivore =

Organism which consumes bacteria

A bacterivore is an organism which obtains energy and nutrients primarily or entirely from the consumption of bacteria. The term is most commonly used to describe free-living, heterotrophic, microscopic organisms such as nematodes as well as many species of amoeba and numerous other types of protozoans, but some macroscopic invertebrates are also bacterivores, including sponges, polychaetes, and certain molluscs and arthropods. Many bacterivorous organisms are adapted for generalist predation on any species of bacteria, but not all bacteria are easily digested; the spores of some species, such as Clostridium perfringens, will never be prey because of their cellular attributes.

== In microbiology ==
Bacterivores can sometimes be a problem in microbiology studies. For instance, when scientists seek to assess microorganisms in samples from the environment (such as freshwater), the samples are often contaminated with microscopic bacterivores, which interfere with the growing of bacteria for study. Adding cycloheximide can inhibit the growth of bacterivores without affecting some bacterial species, but it has also been shown to inhibit the growth of some anaerobic prokaryotes.

== Examples of bacterivores ==
- Caenorhabditis elegans
- Ceriodaphnia quadrangula
- Diaphanosoma brachyura
- Vorticella
- Paramecium
- Paratrimastix pyriformis
- Many species of protozoa
- Many benthic meiofauna, e.g. gastrotrichs
- Springtails
- Many sponges, e.g. Aplysina aerophoba
- Many crustaceans
- Many polychaetes, e.g. feather duster worms
- Some marine molluscs

== See also ==
- Microbivory
