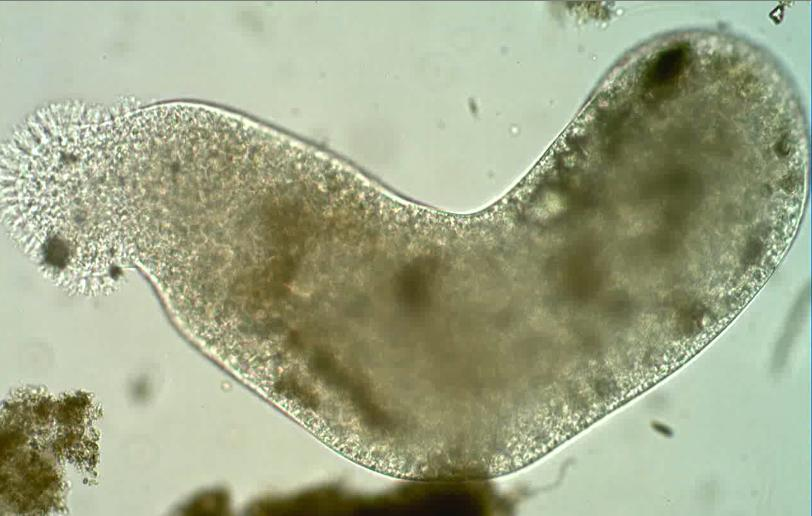
- Pelomyxa palustris

Scientific classification
- Domain: Eukaryota
- Phylum: Amoebozoa
- Class: Archamoebea
- Order: Pelobiontida
- Family: Pelomyxidae
- Genus: Pelomyxa; Greef 1874

Species
- Pelomyxa binucleata; Pelomyxa corona; Pelomyxa flava; Pelomyxa gruberi; Pelomyxa palustris; Pelomyxa prima; Pelomyxa stagnalis

= Pelomyxa =

Genus of flagellar amoeboids

Pelomyxa is a genus of giant flagellar amoebae, usually 500–800 μm but occasionally up to 5 mm in length, found in anaerobic or microaerobic bottom sediments of stagnant freshwater ponds or slow-moving streams.

The genus was created by R. Greeff, in 1874, with Pelomyxa palustris as its type species. In the decades following the erection of Pelomyxa, researchers assigned numerous new species to it. However, in the last quarter of the 20th century, investigators reduced the genus to a single species, Pelomyxa palustris, which was understood to be a highly changeable organism with a complex life cycle, whose various phases had been mistaken for separate species. All described species were relegated to the status of synonyms, or moved to the unrelated genus Chaos.

Since 2004, four new Pelomyxa species have been described, and two older species have been redescribed and confirmed as valid members of the genus. These developments have raised new questions about the nature of Pelomyxa palustris itself.

== Characteristics ==
Pelomyxa have multiple nuclei, which can number from two to several thousand in rare cases. A moving cell is cylindrical in shape, with a single hemispherical pseudopod at the front and a semipermanent projection called a uroid at the back, which is covered in tiny non-motile flagella. They consume a wide variety of food, and have many vacuoles containing both food, such as diatoms, and debris such as sand. Pelomyxa are reliant on symbiotic bacteria that function similarly to the mitochondria of eukaryotes, enabling them to exploit aerobic metabolism in the presence of oxygen.

== Classification ==
The classification of Pelomyxa has been the subject of considerable discussion, in recent decades.

Pelomyxa lack mitochondria, as well as several other organelles usually found in eukaryote cells (notably, peroxisomes and dictyosomes). At one time, they were also believed to lack flagella and to be incapable of mitosis. As nucleated cells that lacked "nearly every other cell-inclusion of eukaryotes", Pelomyxa were, for a time, regarded as surviving "proto-Eukaryotes", standing somewhere between the bacteria and the modern cell. In 1973, it was proposed that the ancestors of Pelomyxa palustris had branched off from the eukaryote line before the advent of mitochondria In 1976, Jean M. Whatley wrote that Pelomyxa palustris "may justly be considered the most primitive eukaryotic organism living today." As such, the organism was potentially a modern analogue of the ancestral eukaryote that, according to the theory of serial endosymbiosis, internalized the bacterial symbiont that later evolved into the mitochondria of the modern cell. The species was known to host several bacterial symbionts. While the function of these was unclear, Whatley argued that they might provide a useful evolutionary example, indicating the "ways in which a bacterial mitochondrial transformation might have been attained."

In 1982, Lynn Margulis created the subclass Caryoblastea (or Pelobiontidae) for "anaerobic amoebas that lack undulipodia," and assigned Pelomyxa to it as the only member of the group. The following year, Cavalier-Smith included the genus with several other "primitive" amitochondriate amoeboids in a new taxonomical group: the Archamoebae. The Archamoebae were, in turn, recruited to the new kingdom of Archezoa, along with other amitochondriate eukaryotes, the Metamonads and the Microsporidia.

The primitivity of Pelomyxa came into doubt in 1988, when Joe I. Griffin published a structural study of Pelomyxa palustris showing that the species does, after all, possess rudimentary flagella, and that it does mitose. Griffin concluded that "Pelomyxa is neither primitive nor different from related forms, once it is realized that its relatives are amoeboid flagellates." In 1995, the case against Pelomyxa's primitivity became stronger still, when molecular analysis revealed that the ancestors of Pelomyxa palustris had most probably possessed mitochondria. By the end of the decade, it was clear that all members of Cavalier-Smith's Archamoebae were descended from mitochondriate cells. In other words, they were not early-branching or "primitive" eukaryotes at all, but rather "degenerate protists" that had lost organelles their ancestors had possessed.

Consequently, Pelomyxa and the other Archamoeba were reassigned to the phylum Amoebozoa, under the subphylum Conosa (shared with the Mycetozoan slime moulds). Kingdom Archezoa was eliminated.

== Video gallery ==
Pelomyxa palustris in motion

Sand particles in Pelomyxa cytoplasm
