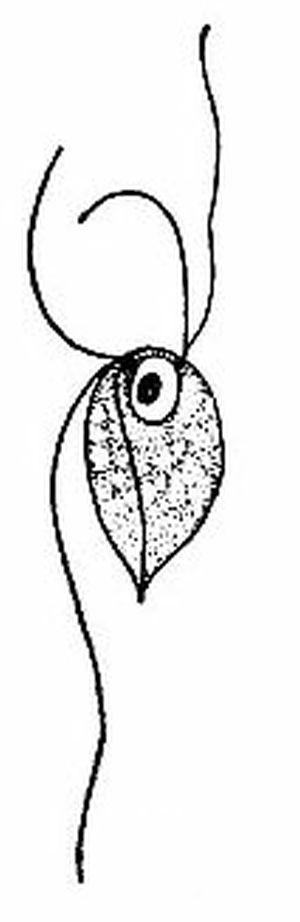
- Monocercomonoides melolanthae

Scientific classification
- Domain: Eukaryota
- (unranked): incertae sedis
- Clade: Metamonada
- Phylum: Preaxostyla
- Order: Oxymonadida; Grassé 1952 emend. Cavalier-Smith 2003

Families
- Oxymonadidae; Polymastigidae; Pyrsonymphidae; Saccinobaculidae; Streblomastigidae

Synonyms
- Oxymonadales; Polymastigales Engler 1898; Polymastigida Calkins 1902; Polymastigina Blochmann 1895; Polymastigoda Seligo 1886; Pyrsonymphales; Pyrsonymphida Grassé 1952

= Oxymonad =

Group of flagellated protozoa

The oxymonads (or Oxymonadida) are a group of flagellated protists found exclusively in the intestines of animals, mostly in termites and other wood-eating insects. Along with the similar parabasalid flagellates, they harbor the symbiotic bacteria that are responsible for breaking down cellulose. There is no evidence for presence of mitochondria (not even anaerobic mitochondrion-like organelles like hydrogenosomes or mitosomes) in oxymonads and three species have been shown to completely lack any molecular markers of mitochondria.

It includes e.g. Dinenympha, Pyrsonympha, Oxymonas, Streblomastix, Monocercomonoides, and Blattamonas.

== Characteristics ==
Most Oxymonads are around 50 μm in size and have a single nucleus, associated with four flagella. Their basal bodies give rise to several long sheets of microtubules, which form an organelle called an axostyle, but different in structure from the axostyles of parabasalids. The cell may use the axostyle to swim, as the sheets slide past one another and cause it to undulate. An associated fiber called the preaxostyle separates the flagella into two pairs. A few oxymonads have multiple nuclei, flagella, and axostyles.

Representation of an oxymonad: 1. Flagella (two pairs); 2. Basal bodies; 3. Nucleus; 4. Motile axostyle; 5. Endoplasmic reticulum, the transport network for molecules going to specific parts of the cell; 6. Reduced Golgi apparatus; modifies proteins and sends them out of the cell; 7. Pinocytic pore, for filter feeding; 8. Endosome, sorts material; 9. Membrane-bound granules

== Relationship to Trimastix and Paratrimastix ==
The free-living flagellates Trimastix and Paratrimastix are closely related to the oxymonads. They lack aerobic mitochondria and have four flagella separated by a preaxostyle, but unlike the oxymonads have a feeding groove. This character places the Oxymonads, Trimastix, and Paratrimastix among the Excavata, and in particular they may belong to the metamonads. Molecular phylogenetic studies indeed place Preaxostyla (oxymonads, Trimastix, and Paratrimastix) in Metamonada.

== Taxonomy ==
Cladogram of Oxymonadida

- - Polymastigidae
  - - Saccinobaculidae
    - - Oxymonadidae
      - - Opisthomitus
        - Pyrsonymphidae

- Order Oxymonadida Grassé 1952 emend. Cavalier-Smith 2003
  - Family Oxymonadidae Kirby 1928 [Oxymonadaceae; Oxymonadinae Cleveland 1934]
    - Genus ?Metasaccinobaculus Freitas 1945
    - Genus Barroella Zeliff 1944 [Kirbyella Zeliff 1930 non Kirkaldy 1906 non Bolivar 1909]
    - Genus Microrhopalodina Grassé & Foa 1911 [Proboscidiella Kofoid & Swezy 1926]
    - Genus Opisthomitus Grassé 1952 non Duboscq & Grassé 1934
    - Genus Oxymonas Janicki 1915
    - Genus Sauromonas Grassé & Hollande 1952
  - Family Polymastigidae Bütschli 1884 [Polymastiginae Kirby 1931; Polymastigaceae; Streblomastigaceae; Streblomastigidae Kofoid & Swezy 1919]
    - Genus ?Paranotila Cleveland 1966
    - Genus ?Tubulimonoides Krishnamurthy & Sultana 1976
    - Genus Blattamonas Treitli et al. 2018
    - Genus Brachymonas (Grassé 1952) Treitli et al. 2018 non Hiraishi et al. 1995
    - Genus Monocercomonoides Travis 1932
    - Genus Polymastix Bütschli 1884 non Gruber 1884
    - Genus Streblomastix Kofoid & Swezy 1920
  - Family Pyrsonymphidae Grassé 1892 [Pyrsonymphaceae; Pyrsonymphinae Kirby 1937 nom. nud.; Dinenymphidae Grassé 1911; Dinenymphinae Cleveland et al. 1934; Dinenymphaceae]
    - Genus Dinenympha Leidy 1877 [Pyrsonympha (Dinenympha) (Leidy 1877) Koidzumi 1921]
    - Genus Pyrsonympha Leidy 1877 [Pyrsonema Kent 1881; Lophophora Comes 1910 non Coulter 1894 non Kraatz 1895 non Moeschler 1890]
  - Family Saccinobaculidae Brugerolle & Lee 2002 ex Cavalier-Smith 2012 [Saccinobaculinae Cleveland et al. 1934]
    - Genus Notila Cleveland 1950
    - Genus Saccinobaculus Cleveland-Hall & Sanders & Collier 1934
