= Pyrsonympha =

Scientific classification
- Domain: Eukaryota
- (unranked): incertae sedis
- Clade: Metamonada
- Phylum: Preaxostyla
- Order: Oxymonadida
- Family: Pyrsonymphidae
- Genus: Pyrsonympha; Leidy, 1877

Type species
- Pyrsonympha vertens Leidy, 1877

Synonyms
- Pyrsonema (sic) Leidy, 1881

Genus of flagellated protists

Pyrsonympha is a genus of excavates.

It includes the species Pyrsonympha vertens.

== Species ==
List of Pyrsonympha species.

- P. affinis Fedorowa 1923
- P. elongata Georgevitch 1932
- P. flagellata Grassé 1894
- P. grandis Koidzumi 1921
- P. granulata Powell 1928
- P. havilalldi Das 1972
- P. major Powell 1928
- P. minor Powell 1928
- P. modesta Koidzumi 1921
- P. omblensis Georgevitch 1951
- P. rostrata Mukherjee & Maiti 1988
- P. tirapi Mukherjee & Maiti 1988
- P. vertens Leidy 1877
