= Oxymonas =

Scientific classification
- Domain: Eukaryota
- (unranked): incertae sedis
- Clade: Metamonada
- Phylum: Preaxostyla
- Order: Oxymonadida
- Family: Oxymonadidae
- Genus: Oxymonas; Janicki, 1915

Type species
- Oxymonas granulosa Janicki, 1915

Genus of flagellated protists

Oxymonas is a genus of excavates.

== History ==
The genus Oxymonas within Excavata, was discovered by Janicki in 1915 within termites. Oxymonas was established in order to accommodate a newly discovered species, Oxymonas granulosa. Through the discovery of Oxymonas, Janicki was also responsible for coining the term karyomastigont for a new structure which was observed in this genus and other termite symbionts.

== Structure ==
Oxymonas is found to be sub-elliptical in its body shape and has a pointed posterior end. Oxymonas is distinguishable by the rostellum, which can be thought of as an elongated proboscis. The rostellum projects anteriorly from the organism and ends in a holdfast apparatus that allows for the attachment to the gut of the termite. The rostellum is composed of a system of microtubules. Oxymonas have two pairs of flagella which originate from pairs of basal bodies, which are located at the base of the rostellum. These basal body pairs are connected to the preaxostyle, which is a paracrystalline structure. In addition to the preaxostyle, there is an axostyle. This organelle moves the Oxymonas by undulating and changing shape in a sinusoidal fashion. The axostyle is also composed of microtubules.

Oxymonas secondarily lost their mitochondria and the Golgi dictyosomes. Because Oxymonas lack both these cellular components, energy producing processes must take place in the cytoplasm of the cell. Genes encoding proteins that would be functional in the Golgi are present, thus indicating that they evolved to lose their Golgi dictyosomes over time. Oxymonas are useful to serve as models regarding mitochondrial evolution as they are one of the few known eukaryotes to have completely lost their mitochondria. The nucleus is ovoid and can be found towards the anterior end close to the axostyle. Due to the endoplasm being clear, wood particles can often be observed within the organisms. An aspect not clearly understood and further focus of research is the composition and structure of the cell surface of Oxymonas.
