= Paratrimastix =

Scientific classification
- Domain: Eukaryota
- Supergroup: Metamonada
- Phylum: Preaxostyla
- Order: Paratrimastigida
- Family: Paratrimastigidae; Zhang, Táborský, Silberman, Pánek, Čepička & Simpson, 2015
- Genus: Paratrimastix; Zhang, Táborský, Silberman, Pánek, Čepička & Simpson, 2015

Species
- Paratrimastix pyriformis; Paratrimastix eleionoma

Genus of protists

Paratrimastix is a genus of free-living freshwater anaerobic excavate protists from the group Metamonada, that was segregated from the genus Trimastix in 2015. The best studied species is Paratrimastix pyriformis.
