= Mitochondrion-related organelle =

Concept in microbiology

Mitochondria-related organelles (MRO) are intracellular organelles which function like mitochondria, but differ in one or more key aspects. The MRO designation refers to three main types of organelles: H_{2}-producing mitochondria, hydrogenosomes, or mitosomes. Key aspects in which MROs may differ from mitochondria found in humans may include lack of ATP production, production of H_{2} molecules, lack of an electron transport chain, and (commonly) lack of using O2 as the terminal electron acceptor. They are produced by reductive evolution, via the loss of "signature" mitochondrial functions simply no longer useful in the lifestyle of its host.

Like mitochondria, MROs contain a double membrane; however, they commonly do not possess a genome, relying wholly on imported proteins. The lack of DNA is not universal: complete elimination of the DNA requires that genes needed for any remaining function to be transferred to the nucleus and not every MRO is far along enough in the process.

Some MROs, as mentioned, do produce ATP providing power to the host cell. Research has shown there is also a role for MROs in amino acid metabolism and lipid metabolism. Additionally, some research shows that these organelles have been retained due to their function in Iron–sulfur cluster (Fe–S) assembly.

== Examples ==
MROs can be characterized in terms of what functions have been lost (and in the case of extended glycolysis, gained). (Note: Extended glycolysis involves converting pyruvate, ADP, and Pi into ATP, CO_{2}, acetate, and H_{2}.) Some examples are:

Instance	ATP production	OXPHOS	Extended glycolysis	TCA cycle	Amino acid metabolism	C1 metabolism	Fe-S cluster production	mtDNA
Mitochondrion (human)	Yes	Yes	No	Yes	17	Yes	Yes	Yes
Mitochondrion (Plasmodium)	Yes	Yes	No	Yes	9?	Yes	Yes	Yes
Hydrogenosome (trichomonad)	Yes	no, but has complex I	Yes	No	6	Yes	Yes	No
Hydrogenosome (Blastocystis)	Yes	no, but has complex I & III	Yes	Partial	9+	Yes	Yes	Yes
MRO of Paratrimastix pyriformis	No	No	No	?	?	Yes	Yes	No
Mitosome	No	No	No	No	No	No	Yes	No
