= Paleoplastes =

Paleoplastes Temporal range: Late Cretaceous (Cenomanian), 98.8 ± 0.62 Ma

Scientific classification
- Domain: Eukaryota
- Phylum: Amoebozoa
- Infraphylum: Mycetozoa
- Class: ?Dictyostelia
- Order: incertae sedis
- Genus: †Paleoplastes Poinar & Vega 2021

Type species
- †Paleoplastes burmanica Poinar & Vega 2021

Extinct genus of slime molds

Paleoplastes (meaning "ancient plasma") is a fossil genus, potentially a dictyostelid, from the Late Cretaceous period in what is now Myanmar. It is an amoeba belonging to the phylum Amoebozoa. It comprises a single known species, Paleoplastes burmanica.

== Discovery ==
Paleoplastes is known from a single specimen trapped within a piece of burmite, likely produced by an araucarian tree indicated by araucaroid wood fibres in the sample, from the Noije Bum Summit Site mine in the Hukawng Valley near Mong Hkun. The site was initially dated to the late Albian, but a later study placed the fossil in the early Cenomanian.
