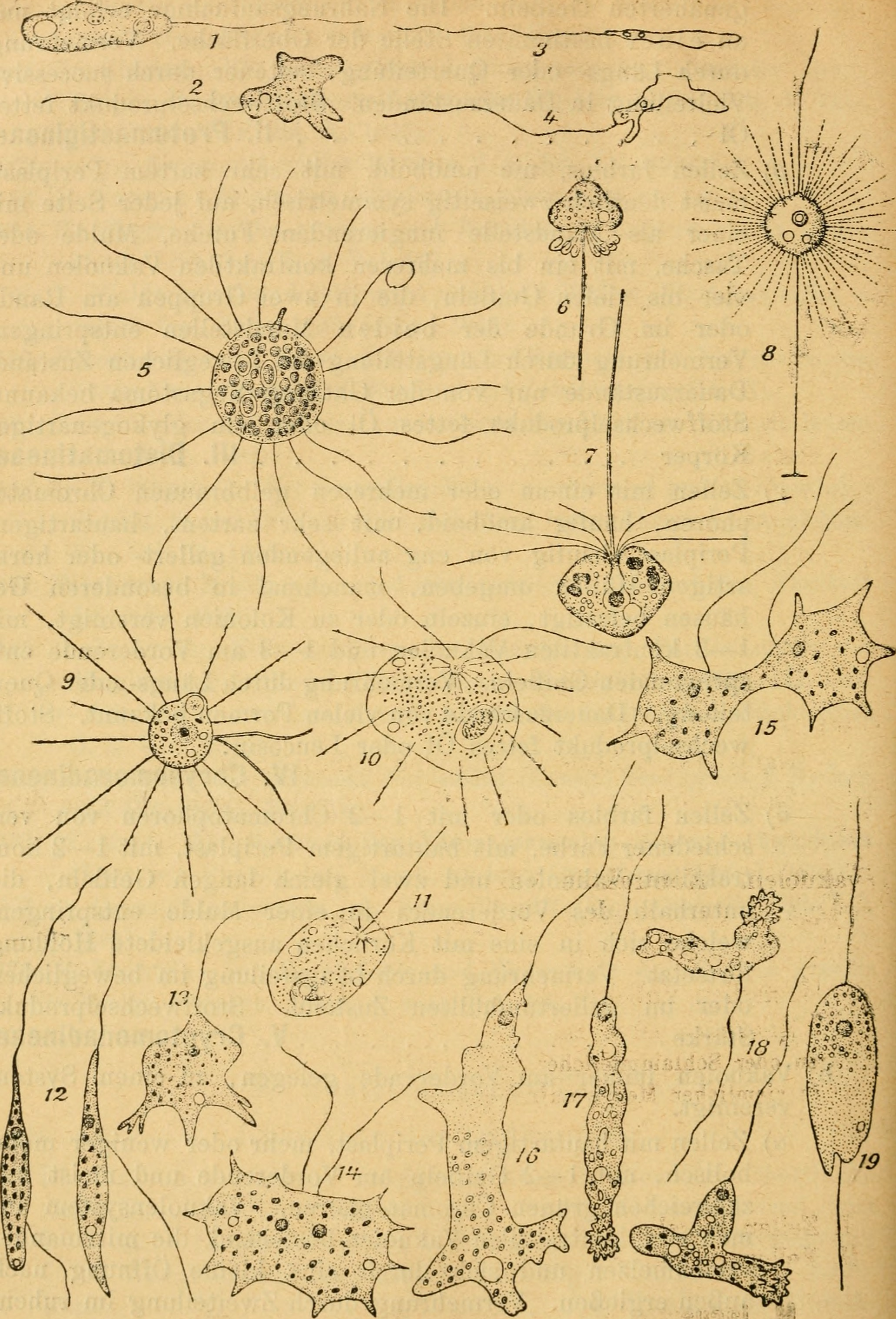
- Mastigamoeba spp., fig. 3-4, fig. 16-18

Scientific classification
- Domain: Eukaryota
- Phylum: Amoebozoa
- Class: Archamoebea
- Order: Pelobiontida
- Family: Mastigamoebidae
- Genus: Mastigamoeba; F.E. Schulze, 1875

Species
- M. aspera M. balamuthi M. hylae M. longfilum M. punctachora M. schizophrenia M. setosa M. simplex

Synonyms
- Phreatamoeba; Mastigina

= Mastigamoeba =

Genus of flagellar amoeboids

Mastigamoeba is a genus of pelobionts, and treated by some as members of the Archamoebae group of protists. Mastigamoeba are characterized as anaerobic, amitochondriate organisms that are polymorphic. Their dominant life cycle stage is as an amoeboid flagellate. Species are typically free living, though endobiotic species have been described.

The genus is relatively understudied, and under contention regarding the composition of the genus. While dozens of species have been described (some in other genera such as Phreatamoeba, Dinamoeba, and Mastigina), the well described species are Mastigamoeba aspera Schulze, 1875; Mastigamoeba simplex Kent, 1880; Mastigamoeba chlamys Frenzel, 1897 Lemmermann, 1914; Mastigamoeba viridis Prowazek, 1900; Mastigamoeba trichophora Lauterborn, 1901; Mastigamoeba balamuthi (Chàvez et al., 1986) Simpson et al., 1997; Mastigamoeba schizophrenia Simpson et al., 1997; and Mastigamoeba punctachora Bernard, Simpson and Patterson, 2000. Mastigamoeba balamuthi was initially referred to as Phreatamobea balamuthi and are treated by some as indistinguishable at the generic level, though this is not universally accepted. All species share many similarities with other pelobionts, such as Mastigella and the related Entamoeba.

It includes Mastigamoeba balamuthi.

A strain previously called as Mastigamoeba invertens (ATCC 50338) is now classified as Breviata anathema.

== History ==
Mastigamoeba was described as a genus of species characterized by an ameboid body with a hyaline based cytoplasm and a flagellum. Due to its similarities to genera such as Mastigella and Mastigina, the genus Mastigamoeba was specified in 1891 to only include organisms with the following features: amoeboid flagellates with hyaline based cytoplasm, a direct connection between the flagellum and the nucleus, on occasions with lateral pseudopods, and nucleus with an elongated shape. Throughout the 20th century, hundreds of species were described under the genus Mastigamoeba based on external morphological characteristics alone. However, recent discoveries regarding life cycles have shown that a single organism takes on many morphologies throughout its life cycle, putting the number of described species into question. There are currently nine confirmed distinguished species of Mastigamoeba, with many more in contention. Tom Cavalier-Smith described the class Archamoebae in 1983 and among others included the order Mastigamoebid, which includes the genus Mastigamoeba.

Historically, amoeboid flagellates have been considered Pelobionts, which encompasses mastigamoebids and pelomyxids.

== Habitat and ecology ==
Mastigamoebae are a type of pelobiont. Pelobionts are considered microoxic; they thrive in environments with 10–20% of atmospheric oxygen such as in upper mud or sand layers, or the water-sediment surface of shallow ponds. Some have been found in sewage treatment plants. Pelobionts are typically found worldwide, with studies confirming their extensive presence in temperate regions of Europe and North America. Habitats typically include freshwater rivers and lakes, with the highest abundance of organisms in stagnant water, where low-oxygen environments are common. Marine environments are also found to host pelobionts. Habitats in which pelobionts are found are organically rich.

Though most pelobionts are free-living, some members are considered endobiotic, meaning they survive only in the guts of hosts. These members are completely anoxic, and thrive in areas of low pH. They have been found in various vertebrate and invertebrate hosts, particularly within primates and dogs.

== Description ==
Mastigamoeba are characterized as amoeboid flagellates with hyaline (clear) cytoplasm. Mastigamoeba are polymorphic; they switch between multiple morphologies throughout their life cycles. They can exist as amoeboid flagellates, aflagellate amoebae, multinucleate amoebae, and as cysts.

Mastigamoeba are divided into two main clades. Clade A includes those species that are large with a broader and larger flagellum (such as M. balamuthi). Clade B includes those that are smaller, with narrow flagella (such as M. simplex). Uroids are present in Type A species, whereas Type B species feature a trailing pseudopod instead. Type A species typically grow to 200 μm in length, and Type B species are typically smaller than 80 μm in length. The flagellum ranges in length from 10 μm to 60 μm.

The singular flagellum is composed of a 9 + 2 microtubule structure. The flagellar apparatus consists of a single basal body, from which the flagellum arises. There is a microtubular cone that directly connects the flagellar apparatus to the nucleus. In Type A species, this cone is wide, and arises from the base and the lateral ends of the basal body. In Type B species, this cone is narrow, and arises only from the base of the basal body. The flagellar apparatus is positioned anteriorly and aids in movement.

The exterior of the cell is covered in a thin, unevenly distributed layer of organic filamentous material. These filaments run parallel to the cell and are 1 μm at their thickest point. The chemical composition of this extracellular covering is unknown. Some Mastigamoeba have spines distributed irregularly around the cell. These spines are hollow, and their composition is unknown. The organic layer sometimes contains symbionts of prokaryotic origin. The identity and relationship of these symbionts is unknown.

The cyst stage is surrounded by a wall of unknown composition. The cyst stage is uninucleate, and filled with granules.

Mastigamoeba lack Golgi dictyosomes, though core Golgi functions are retained by related elements in the endomembrane system. The endoplasmic reticulum contains some bundled structures, and various vesicles that fulfil the core functions of a Golgi dictyosome.

Peroxisomes are not present in all Archamoebae. Studies show that some Mastigamoeba contain peroxisomal proteins.

Archamoebae are all amitochondriate, meaning they lack typical mitochondria. Mitochondria in Mastigamoeba have been reduced to or changed to forms that still retain some mitochondrial function or have altered functions.

Species such as M. balamuthi have mitochondria-related organelles called hydrogenosomes. These function to produce ATP by partial anaerobic oxidation of pyruvate. Hydrogenosomes have lost their genome, and the electron-transport chain. They produce hydrogen gas as a by-product. Hydrogenosomes have been formed from mitochondria through loss of aerobic life stages. The biosynthesis of iron-sulfur clusters has transitioned to be a cytosolic function through a lateral gene transfer event.

Other species have reduced mitochondrial organelles called mitosomes. These have reduced so far that their only function is the biosynthesis of iron-sulfur clusters. They have no energy metabolic function, and as a result the organisms must attain energy by other means. To make up for the loss of ATP production, amitochondriate organisms have acquired the ability to import ATP.

The main trophic form of Mastigamoeba is a uninucleate amoeboid flagellate, though some species have multinucleate morphologies. M. schizophrenia has up to 10 nuclei in its multinucleate stage. In M. balamuthi, the dominant trophic form is as a multinucleate, in which it can have up to 46 nuclei. Reproduction occurs by mitosis and subsequent budding. When multinucleate, this results in unequal nuclei amongst daughter cells.

== Practical importance ==
Mastigamoeba balamuthi is the most well-known species of Mastigamoeba, as it has served as a model organism for study and research regarding amitochondriate organisms. The method of iron-sulfur cluster biosynthesis and how it has moved from the mitochondria to the cytosol has been extensively studied in M. balamuthi. The mitochondrial remnants in M. balamuthi are thought to be an intermediate degenerate stage between a typical mitochondria and more reduced mitosomes found in other pelobionts.
