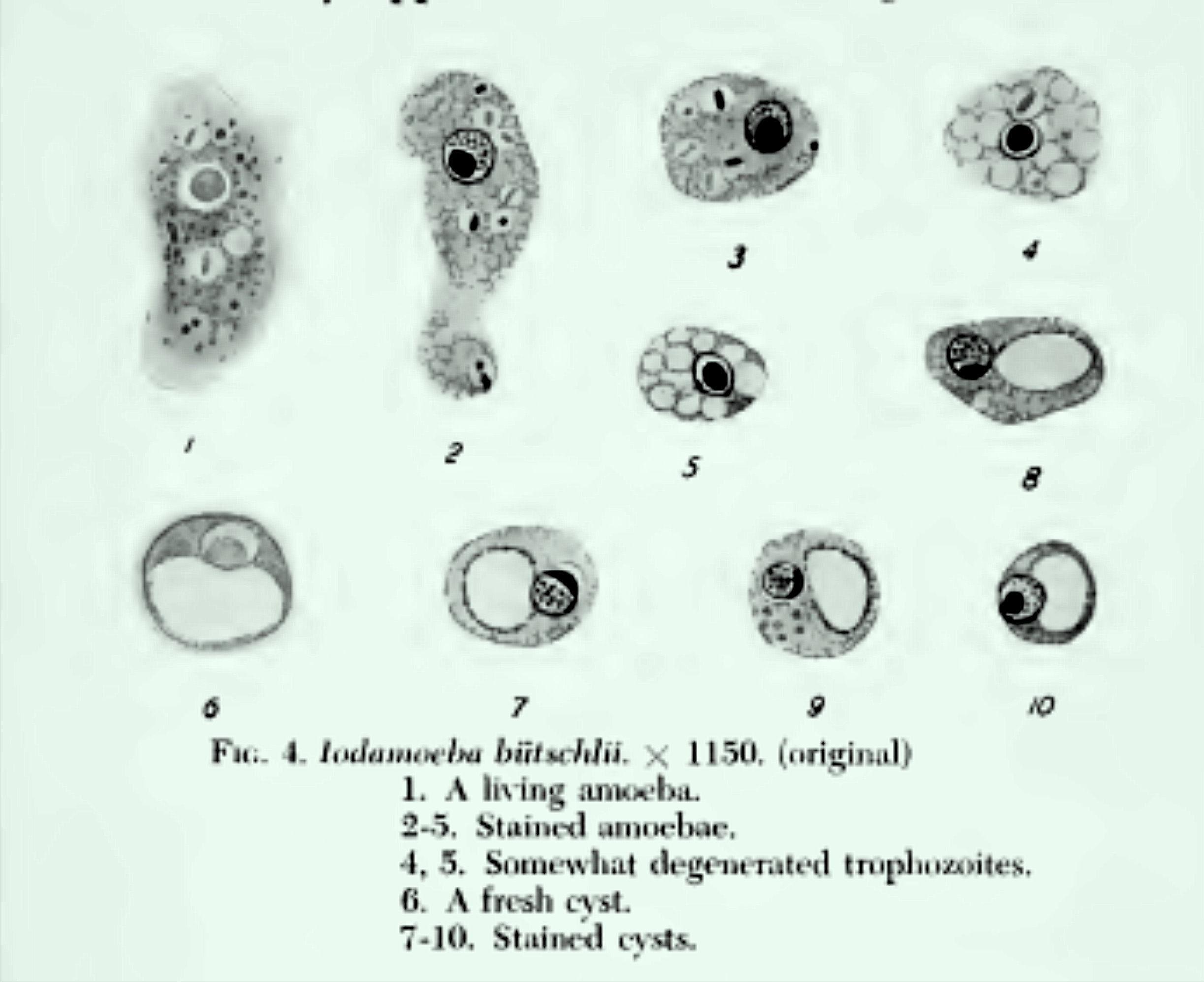
- Iodamoeba buetschlii

Scientific classification
- Domain: Eukaryota
- Phylum: Amoebozoa
- Subphylum: Conosa
- Order: Amoebida
- Genus: Iodamoeba
- Species: I. buetschlii

Binomial name
- Iodamoeba buetschlii (Prowazek, 1912)

= Iodamoeba buetschlii =

Species of amoeba

Iodamoeba buetschlii is a species of amoeba.

It gets its name from its appearance when stained with iodine.

Named for Otto Bütschli by Prowazek in 1912, Iodamoeba buetschlii is a nonpathogenic parasitic ameba, commonly found in the large intestines of people, pigs and other mammals.

The distribution of I. buetschlii is worldwide. Most likely to be the original host, pigs are often targeted with I. buetschlii. I. buetschlii is identified as a non-pathogenic parasite. Often, this parasite is mistaken as a pathogenic parasite because non-pathogenic and pathogenic parasites have the same characteristics. In terms of illnesses, humans have a low prevalence of I. buetschlii (4-8%). I. buetschlii is an indicator of oral-fecal contamination and humans may experience diarrhea.

== Trophozoite ==
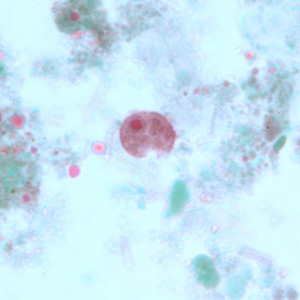
The trophozoites are 9–14 micrometres in diameter. Trophozoites are one of the two forms of I. buetschlii. This form has a pseudopodia for locomotion. The pseudopodia is short and blunt. It moves in a slow manner. The trophozoite has a single nucleus, prominent for nuclear endosome and many cytoplasmic vacuoles. The ectoplasm and the granular endoplasm are often hard to distinguish. The nucleus is fairly large and vesicular, containing a large endosome, surrounding by light staining granules about midway between it and the nuclear membrane. Achromatic strands stretch between the endosome and nuclear membrane without any peripheral granules. Food vacuoles are commonly filled with bacteria and yeast. Trophozoites are often identified by a stool smear, found in loose stools.

== Cyst ==
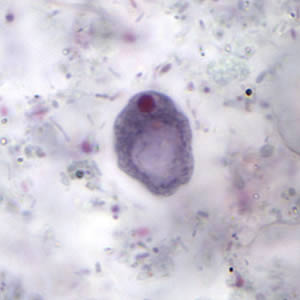
The cysts are 8–10 micrometres in diameter, with a thick wall and a large glycogen vacuole that stains darkly with iodine. Usually harmless, it may cause amebiasis in immunologically compromised individuals. As the second form of I. butschlii, cysts have an oval shaped- single nucleus with a prominent nuclear endosome. This form is also large, single, glycogen-filled vacuole called iodinophilous vacuole (glycogen stains with iodine). Cysts are the infective stage of I. buetschlii. Unlike trophozoites, cysts are often found in formed stools.

== Lifecycle ==
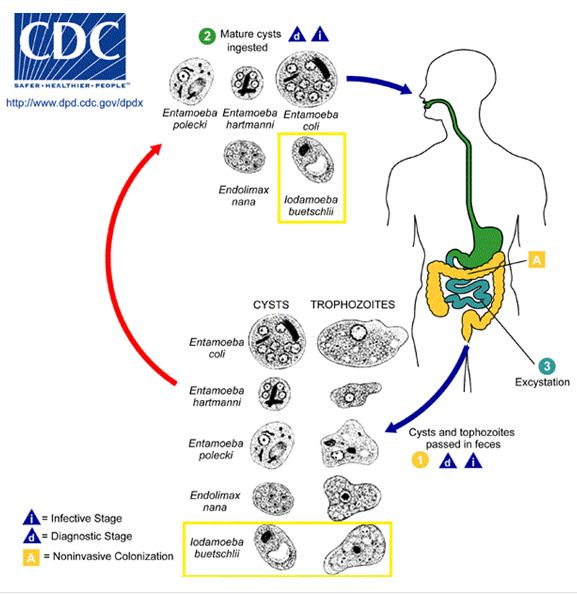
trophozoite in cecum & colon-->cyst in feces- ingested-->trophozoite in cecum & colon

== Treatment ==
In a research study, amebas were seen in stool samples of a patient and identified as I. buetschlii. The patient was treated with dehydroemetine and chloroquine. After treatment they noticed the patient's complement fixation titer decreased to 1:2 in a serum sample, obtained two months later.
