= Human-to-human transmission =

Spread of an infection from one person to another

Human-to-human transmission (HHT) is an epidemiologic vector, (Note: Attributed to multiple references:) especially in case the disease is borne by individuals known as superspreaders. In these cases, the basic reproduction number of the virus, which is the average number of additional people that a single case will infect without any preventative measures, can be as high as 203.9. Interhuman transmission is a synonym for HHT.

The World Health Organization designation of a pandemic hinges on the demonstrable fact that there is sustained HHT in two regions of the world.

== Synopsis ==
Relevant microbes may be viruses, bacteria, or fungi, and they may be spread through breathing, talking, coughing, sneezing, spraying of liquids, toilet flushing or any activities which generate aerosol particles or droplets or generate fomites, such as raising of dust.

Transfer efficiency depends not only on surface, but also on pathogen type. For example, avian influenza survives on both porous and non-porous materials for 144 hours.

The microbes may also be transmitted by poor use of cutlery or improper sanitation of dishes or bedlinen. Particularly problematic are toilet practices, which lead to the fecal–oral route. STDs are by definition spread through this vector.

== List of HHT diseases ==
Examples of some HHT diseases are listed below.

- measles: vaccine available
- mumps: vaccine available
- chicken pox: vaccine available
- small pox
- bubonic plague: slim non-nil risk
- pneumonic plague: 1910-11 Manchurian plague
- tuberculosis
- Norovirus
- monkeypox
- SARS-CoV-1
- SARS-CoV-2: vaccine available
- MERS
- Avian flu
- Sexually transmitted infections (STIs) or sexually transmitted diseases (STDs):
  - Syphilis, aka French pox
