= Axostyle =

Cytoskeletal structure

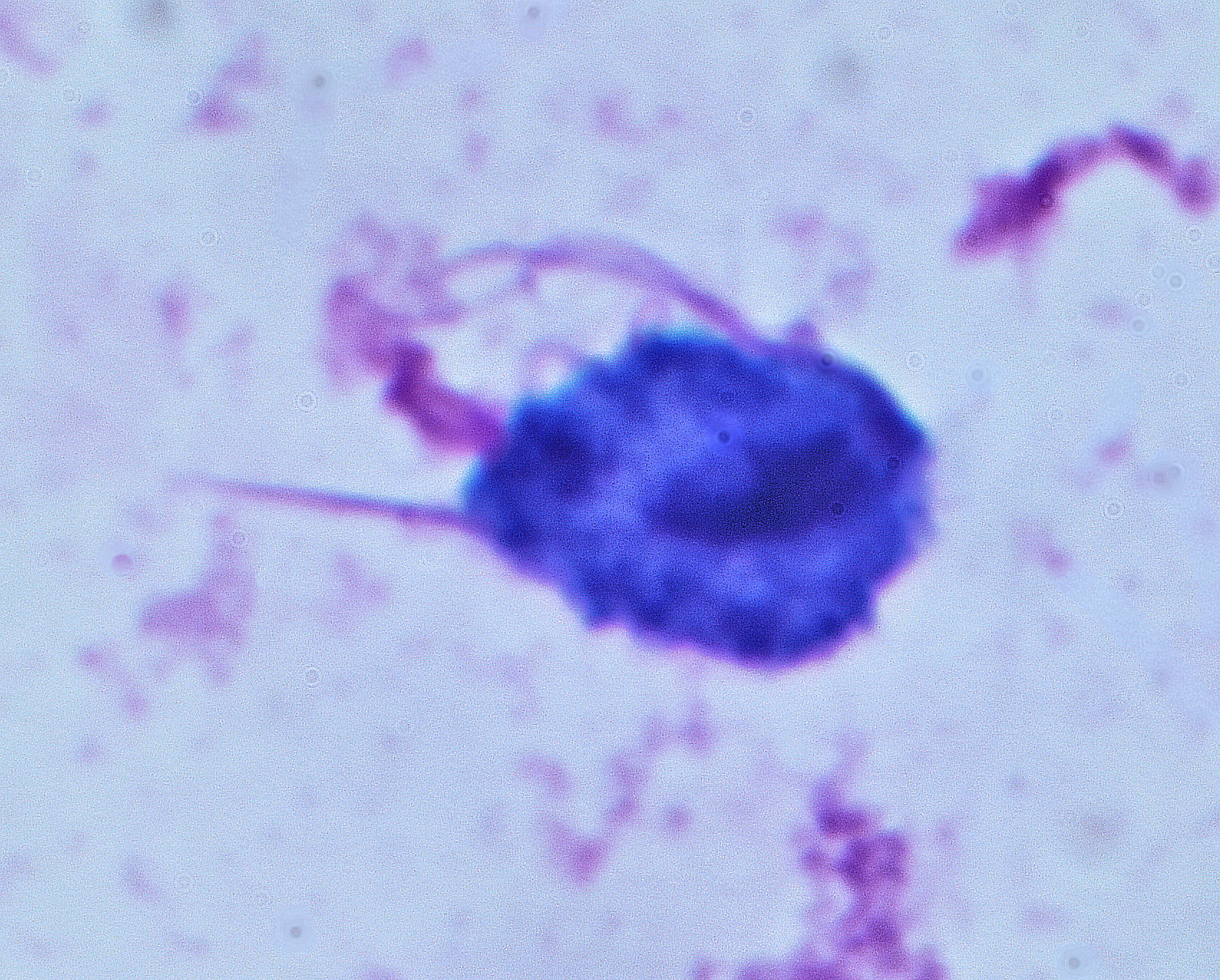
Trichomonas vaginalis May-Grünwald-Giemsa staining. A barb-like axostyle (left) projects opposite the four-flagella bundle.

An axostyle is a sheet of microtubules found in certain protists. It arises from the bases of the flagella, sometimes projecting beyond the end of the cell, and is often flexible or contractile, and so may be involved in movement and provides support for the cell. Axostyles originate in association with a flagellar microtubular root and occur in two groups, the oxymonads and parabasalids; they have different structures and are not homologous. Within trichomonads the axostyle has been theorised to participate in locomotion and cell adhesion, but also karyokinesis during cell division.
