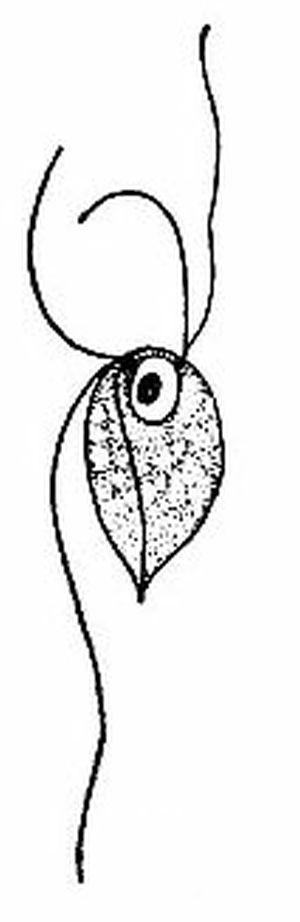
- Monocercomonoides melolanthae

Scientific classification
- Domain: Eukaryota
- Supergroup: Metamonada
- Phylum: Preaxostyla

Orders
- Paratrimastigida; Trimastigida; Oxymonadida

Synonyms
- Anaeromonadea; Anaeromonada; Oxymonadea Grassé 1952; Pyrsonympha; Axostylea

= Preaxostyla =

Group of excavate protists

Preaxostyla, also known as Anaeromonadea, is a group of excavate protists, comprising the oxymonads, Trimastix, and Paratrimastix. This group is studied as a model system for reductive evolution of mitochondria, because it includes both organisms with anaerobic mitochondrion-like organelles (Trimastix and Paratrimastix), and those that have completely lost their mitochondria (oxymonads Monocercomonoides, Streblomastix, and Blattamonas).

== Phylogeny and taxonomy ==
Based on the work of Zhang et al. 2015.

- - Trimastix Kent 1880 {Trimastigida Cavalier-Smith 2003: Trimastigidae Saville Kent 1880}
  - - Paratrimastix Zhang et al. 2015 {Paratrimastigidae Zhang et al. 2015}
    - Oxymonadida Grassé 1952 emend. Cavalier-Smith 2003
