= Mitosome =

Cell organelle in a few species

A mitosome (also called a crypton in early literature) is a mitochondrion-related organelle (MRO) found in a variety of parasitic unicellular eukaryotes, such as members of the supergroup Excavata. The mitosome was first discovered in 1999 in Entamoeba histolytica, an intestinal parasite of humans, and mitosomes have also been identified in several species of Cryptosporidia, Microsporidia and in Giardia intestinalis.

The mitosome has been detected only in anaerobic or microaerophilic eukaryotes which do not have fully developed mitochondria, and hence do not have the capability of gaining energy from mitochondrial oxidative phosphorylation. The functions of mitosomes, while varied, have not yet been well characterized, but they may be associated with sulfate metabolism and biosynthesis of phospholipids and Fe–S clusters. Mitosomes, like other MROs, likely evolved from mitochondria, based on similarities in structure, function, and biochemical signaling pathways, and may have convergently evolved across eukaryote lineages.

== Structure and function ==
Mitosomes are membrane-bound organelles closely related to mitochondria in structure, though functional overlap is limited. Unlike mitochondria, mitosomes do not have genes within them; instead, the genes for mitosomal components are contained in the nuclear genome. An early report suggested the presence of DNA in this organelle, but subsequent research has shown this not to be the case. Many proteins within mitosomes (e.g., in Giardia intestinalis) have poorly resolved or unexplored functions which are likely related to metabolism and protein transport. Unlike mitochondria, mitosomes appear to lack electron transport chains, N-terminal targeting sequences, and the ability to fuse with each other.

Current knowledge indicates mitosomes probably play a role in Fe–S cluster assembly, since they do not display any of the proteins involved in other major mitochondrial functions (oxidative phosphorylation via aerobic respiration, haem biosynthesis) while they do display proteins required for Fe–S cluster biosynthesis (like frataxin, cysteine desulfurase, Isu1 and a mitochondrial Hsp70). Additionally, modified mitosomes in the intracellular parasitic protist Paramikrocytos canceri may biosynthesize phospholipids and support glycolytic ATP production, based on genomic and transcriptomic analysis. Mitosomes may also facilitate metabolic activation of sulfates in some eukaryotes, based on analyses of enzymes from mitosomes in Entamoeba histolytica and Mastigamoeba balamuthi. Recent work indicates that mitosomes participate in the transformation of Entamoeba histolytica trophozoites into cysts, thereby playing a key role in the pathogenic life cycle of this organism, though the role of mitosomes in pathogenicity is less clear for many other parasitic eukaryotes.

== Origin and evolution ==
In the most widely accepted view, mitosomes are ultimately derived from mitochondria, and commonalities between the protein transport and signaling networks of mitochondria, hydrogenosomes (a related class of MROs), and mitosomes have been interpreted as relics of their common endosymbiotic origin. Like mitochondria, they have a double membrane and most proteins are delivered to them by a targeting sequence of amino acids. The targeting sequence is similar to that used for mitochondria and true mitochondrial presequences will deliver proteins to mitosomes. A number of proteins associated with mitosomes have been shown to be closely related to those of mitochondria and hydrogenosomes.

Mitosomes appear to have degeneratively evolved from mitochondria multiple times across eukaryote lineages, and their "mosaic" biochemistry in Entamoeba histolytica may reflect a composite ancestry involving both eukaryotes and proteobacteria. It has been proposed that MROs such as mitosomes evolved in anoxic marine environments which predominated during the Proterozoic, thus explaining their anaerobic metabolic functionality.
