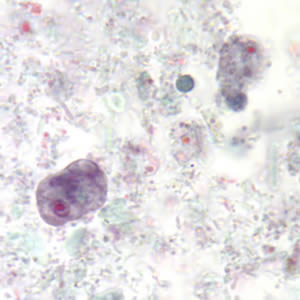
- Trophozoites of Endolimax nana stained with trichrome

Scientific classification
- Domain: Eukaryota
- Clade: Amorphea
- Phylum: Amoebozoa
- Class: Archamoebea
- Order: Pelobiontida
- Family: Mastigamoebidae
- Genus: Endolimax; Kuenen & Swellengrebel, 1913

= Endolimax =

Genus of amoebozoan

Endolimax is a genus of amoebozoa that are found in the intestines of various animals, including the species E. nana found in humans. Originally thought to be non-pathogenic, studies suggest it can cause intermittent or chronic diarrhea. Additionally, it is very significant in medicine because it can provide false positives for other tests, notably the similar species Entamoeba histolytica, the pathogen responsible for amoebic dysentery, and because its presence indicates the host has consumed fecal material. It forms cysts with four nuclei which excyst in the body and become trophozoites. Endolimax nana nuclei have a large endosome somewhat off-center and small amounts of visible chromatin or none at all.

== Cyst ==
Cysts are small, with a spherical to ellipsoidal shape. Mature cysts contain four nuclei; immature cysts are rarely seen. These cysts measure 5–10 um, with a usual range of 6–8 um. In stained preparations, the nucleus has a distinct karyosome that, while not as large as that seen in the trophozoite, is still larger than the karyosome of the Entamoeba species. Peripheral chromatin is absent. Although the nuclei are not visible in unstained preparations, the karyosomes are readily apparent in iodine-stained wet mounts. The cytoplasm may contain diffuse glycogen, and chromatid bodies are absent. Occasionally, small granules or inclusions may occur in the cytoplasm.

== Trophozoite ==
This stage is small, measuring 6–12 μm, with an average range of 8–10 um. Living trophozoites are sluggish and generally non-progressive. The single nucleus sometimes is visible in unstained preparations. In stained organisms, the karyosome usually is large and irregularly shaped, but occasionally it may be fragmented or placed against one side of the nuclear membrane. There is no peripheral chromatin on the nuclear membrane. The cytoplasm, which is coarsely granular and often highly vacuolated, may contain bacteria.

== See also ==
- Amoebic dysentery
