= Entamoeba invadens =

Scientific classification
- Domain: Eukaryota
- Supergroup: Amorphea
- Phylum: Amoebozoa
- Class: Archamoebea
- Order: Entamoebida
- Family: Entamoebidae
- Genus: Entamoeba
- Species: E. invadens

Binomial name
- Entamoeba invadens Rodhaim, 1934

Species of amoebozoan parasite

Entamoeba invadens is an amoebozoa parasite of reptiles, within the genus Entamoeba. It is closely related to the human parasite Entamoeba histolytica, causing similar invasive disease in reptiles, in addition to a similar morphology and lifecycle.

== High risk species ==
Amebiasis has been observed in saurian, ophidian, and chelonian reptiles and is shown to result in a mortality rate of approximately 100%. Several scientists have noted that reptiles native to lower temperature climates tend to be carriers of the parasite, while those species who live in warmer temperatures usually develop pathogenic cases. It has also been found that snakes and lizards have the highest mortality rates in contrast to turtles and crocodiles who tend to be asymptomatic carriers. Symptoms typically include dehydration, anorexia, lethargy, and bloody stools. This condition is usually diagnosed by directly examining fecal samples for trophozoites; however, diagnosis is difficult due to the short lifespan and the morphological similarities to the other Entamoeba species. There is still a great need to develop an assay that is rapid, specific, and sensitive to E. Invadens. The development of such an assay will allow identification of carriers, therefore preventing the spread of E. Invadens to other reptiles.

== Morphology ==
Entamoeba invadens trophozoites and cysts can be visualized with conventional light microscopy techniques. The motile parasite appears amoeboid in shape and becomes round when exposed to stress. The cyst stage of the parasite is usually smaller than the trophozoite, round, and quadrinucleated. In order to differentiate between a cyst and a "stressed" trophozoite under a light microscope, the cells have to be washed with a strong detergent which will lyse all trophozoites and immature cysts, leaving only mature cysts.

== Disease and lifecycle ==
Entamoeba invadens is a causative agent of amoebiasis in reptiles, such as snakes and lizards. Reptile amoebiasis can be treated with metronidazole, an amoebicide drug.

Entamoeba invadens is primarily transmitted via the ingestion of contaminated faeces, also known as the faecal-oral route. It has two distinct lifecycle stages. The first is a resistant cyst stage, which is transmitted outside of a host, and is also known as the infectious stage. The second is the motile trophozoite stage, which is released from the cyst following introduction into the host environment, and is the disease-causing (pathogenic) stage.

To survive and infect other hosts, E. invadens must form a carbohydrate rich cyst. The chemical makeup and of formation of the cyst is of paramount importance to scientists all around the world because detailing this could lead to treatment development. Studies investigating cyst wall composition have shown that the wall specifically contains chitin, chitosan fibrils, and chitin binding proteins. As opposed to walls of plants and fungi who have multilayered walls, the Entamoeba cyst wall is homogenous—containing only one layer. The combination of these elements confers resistance to extreme environmental conditions such as desiccation, heat, and detergent Despite the amount of research conducted to date, the formation of the cyst wall during encystation has not yet been clearly defined. Scientists do know that during this process, the level of cytoplasmic vesicles is significantly reduced, which is thought to be caused by vesicles fusing with the plasma membrane in order to deposit the cyst wall on the exterior of the cell. These cyst wall properties allow the infective form of the parasite to persist for prolonged periods of time in extreme environments before it is ingested by the next host. Once ingested, the cyst travels through the digestive system unaffected until it reaches the small intestine, where it encounters several triggers, that have been found to induce excystation. Such triggers include, low glucose, osmotic shock, and a combination of water, bicarbonate, and bile. Eight pathogenic trophozoites emerge from each cyst (Brewer, 2008) and begin to feed on the bacteria that is naturally found in the reptilian gut in addition to mucin cells that make up the mucosal layer of the large intestine. The parasite will also secrete enzymes that continue to destroy the mucosal layer. This degradation recruits more bacteria to the scene of invasion, further fueling trophozoite replication. In addition to feeding the trophozoites, this excess flow of bacteria also can result in secondary bacterial infections that could also assist in the systemic distribution of the parasite causing liver or brain abscesses. The increased population of trophozoites through various cell signaling pathways will initiate trophozoite aggregation, which is the first step in encystation. Once encystation occurs, the infective cysts are excreted into the environment.

== Cyst formation ==
Unknown signals within the gastro-intestinal tract trigger encystation. The accumulation of trophozoites in one area is thought to be made up of one signal that leads to aggregation, which believed to be the first step in encystation. This multicellular trophozoite aggregate is known as the "precyst." Cells adhere to each other via Gal/GalNac lectin which is found on the surface of the pathogen. Host mucin cells have galactose and N-acetylgalactosamine which serve as the binding sites for these Gal/GalNac lectins. These lectins are a huge area of interest for scientists, as the association between these glycoproteins could potentially be a target for drug therapy. Once the trophozoites begin to aggregate, cyst differentiation is initiated by intracellular rearrangement which leads to cell rounding and cellular compaction. This rearrangement of the actin cytoskeleton seems to be crucial in differentiation to cysts. While encystation is yet to be completely defined in Entamoeba, scientists are getting close. Specific acting binding proteins, small GTPases, Rho kinases, and Rab proteins have all been identified as participants in various stages of encystation, which has been in part due to studying other various parasites, because several pathways and mechanisms have been conserved.

== Use in research ==
Entamoeba invadens has been used as a model system for studying development, and encystation in vitro, particularly due to difficulties associated with studying encystation in the closely related human parasite E. histolytica. Genome sequencing has revealed 74% equivalency in genic regions and 50% equivalency in intergenic regions existing between Entamoeba invadens and Entamoeba histolytica.

For instance, it was found that, during the conversion from the tetraploid uninucleate trophozoite to the tetranucleate cyst, homologous recombination is enhanced. Expression of genes with functions related to the major steps of meiotic recombination also increased during encystations. These findings in E. invadens, combined with evidence from studies of E. histolytica indicate the presence of meiosis in the Entamoeba.

== Genome ==
The genome of E. invadens, sequenced in 2013, was approximately 40 MB in size, and predicted to contain 11,549 genes. Overall, the genome was considered to be highly repetitive. Many genes occurred in large, multi-gene families. When compared to the genome of E. histolytica, Wang et al. found that on average, E. invadens had 62% sequence identity. Comparing the two genomes will allow further insights into the human pathogen, since E. invadens can readily encyst in vitro. The fully sequenced genome of E. invadens will allow researchers to investigate gene expression and virulence at the molecular level, making it an invaluable tool for eradicating this parasite. In addition, sequencing the genome during E. invadens encystation will further highlight drug therapy targets in the closely related human species, Entamoeba histolytica.
