= Entamoeba coli =

Scientific classification
- Domain: Eukaryota
- Supergroup: Amorphea
- Phylum: Amoebozoa
- Class: Archamoebea
- Order: Entamoebida
- Family: Entamoebidae
- Genus: Entamoeba
- Species: E. coli

Binomial name
- Entamoeba coli (Grassi, 1879)

Species of parasitic amoeba

Entamoeba coli is a non-pathogenic species of Entamoeba that frequently exists as a commensal parasite in the human gastrointestinal tract. E. coli (not to be confused with the bacterium Escherichia coli) is important in medicine because it can be confused during microscopic examination of stained stool specimens with the pathogenic Entamoeba histolytica. While this differentiation is typically done by visual examination of the parasitic cysts via light microscopy, new methods using molecular biology techniques have been developed.

This amoeba does not move much by the use of its pseudopod, and creates a "sur place (non-progressive) movement" inside the large intestine. Usually, the amoeba is immobile, and keeps its round shape. This amoeba, in its trophozoite stage, is only visible in fresh, unfixed stool specimens. Sometimes the Entamoeba coli have parasites as well. One is the fungus Sphaerita spp. This fungus lives in the cytoplasm of the E. coli.

The abbreviated scientific name of this amoeba, E. coli, is often mistaken for the bacterium Escherichia coli. Unlike the bacterium, the amoeba is mostly harmless, and does not cause as many intestinal problems as some strains of the E. coli bacterium. To make the naming of these organisms less confusing, "alternate contractions" are used to name the species for the purpose making the naming easier; for example, using Esch. coli and Ent. coli for the bacterium and amoeba, instead of using E. coli for both.

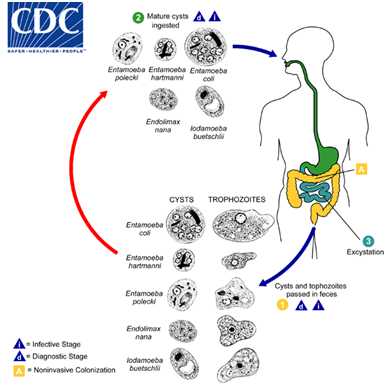
Common lifecycle of various non-pathogenic parasites, including E. coli

== Clinical significance ==
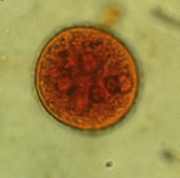
Entamoeba coli cyst with more than four nuclei

The presence of E. coli is not cause in and of itself to seek treatment as it is considered harmless. However, when a person becomes infected with this benign entamoeba, other pathogenic organisms may have been introduced as well, and these other pathogens might cause infection or illness.

== Morphology ==
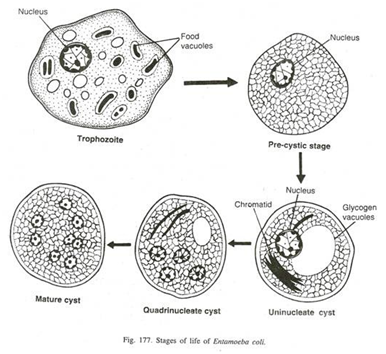
Stages of the Entamoeba coli parasite

Entamoeba species all come in monogenetic forms, or having one generation lifecycles. E. coli has "three distinct morphological forms exist airing the life cycle-Trophozoite, Pre-cystic stage and Cystic stage". This lifecycle gives rise to the general way of how Entamoeba species form. This parasite has one large nucleus with a thick membrane surrounding the nucleus. There are many chromatin inside the nucleus, and one large, irregular-shaped karyosome. The chromatin is clumped, and uneven in disperse inside the nucleus. The parasite forms by binary fission like most Entamoeba spp. The mature cyst is the infective stage, and is known to survive longer than those of E. histolytica. The cysts can survive three to four months outside the host's body after desiccation. The cysts cause infection by consuming contaminated food and drinks like waste water. Sometimes insects and rodents carry the parasite to cause infection in the food and drinks. Excystation happens once the cysts are ingested, and travel to the large intestine.

== Diagnosis ==
E. coli trophozoites can be distinguished by their wide and tapered pseudopodia. They are often mistaken for E. histolytica due to their overlap in size. The cysts are distinguished by noticing the eight nuclei found in the mature form. To diagnose for E. coli, a stool sample is usually tested. This is the best method to check to see if the parasite is E. coli and not E. histolytica. This usually involves checking the cysts for the size, shape, and the number of nuclei. E. coli has cysts in size up to 10 to 35 micrometers, the shape is irregular, oval with a shell-like appearance that is more uniformed compared to E. histolytica, and has up to eight nuclei in the cyst compared to the four nuclei of E. histolytica. To the untrained eye of an inexperienced microbiologist, "tetranucleate cysts of Entamoeba coli can be mistaken for mature cysts of Entamoeba histolytica" Often " a tetranucleate Entamoeba coli cyst is larger than a mature cyst of Entamoeba histolytica, can be variable in shape, and has nuclear peripheral chromatin and karyosome composed of irregular granules" in this matter of comparison. To make a diagnosis for any Entamoeba species, usually a wet mount is created "by finding the characteristic cysts in an iodine stained, formol-ether concentration method or by detecting the characteristic trophozoites in a wet preparation or a permanent stained preparation" to see what they may look like. Also, these stains of trichrome can be used to mount the cysts of any Entamoeba spp. Other tests can be used to diagnosis for Entamoeba spp. These tests involve the use of laboratory methods. Some of these laboratory tests include: the use of light microscopy, culture methods, isoenzyme analysis, antibody detection tests, antigen detection tests, immunochromatographic assays, and DNA-based diagnostic tests. Some uses of microscopy also involve the use of transmission electron microscopy and scanning electron microscopy. Usually, the cysts are freeze fractured to insure that the samples are easier to look at to compare Entamoeba spp. The DNA-based diagnostic tests include the use of DNA extraction, PCR, microarrays, and typing methods.For example, one DNA-based diagnostic test that is changing how Entamoeba spp. is being diagnosis faster and more accurate is by using the "Reverse Line Hybridization Assay" test. This test main purpose is to detect and different Entamoeba spp. in stool samples in order to find the causative agent of amoebic dysentery, E. histolytica. This test involves the use of gene sequencing, and seeing what different genomes each Entamoeba spp. has to help detect the deadly E. histolytica.

== Pathology ==
E. coli are mostly harmless parasites, and do not cause harm to the host. However, there have been cases of internal bleeding. Usually, the cytoplasm of the E. coli "does not contain red blood cells, except in the rare case of patients with intestinal hemorrhage" that leads to blood in the stools of these patients. This may lead to intestinal lesions. Other problems that E. coli causes are usually result from having too many in the large intestine. For example, large populations of E. coli may lead to "dyspepsia, hyperacidity, gastritis, and indigestion"; these are common problems of most intestinal parasites.

== Treatment ==
There is generally no need to treat for E. coli, due to the rarity of this parasite becoming infectious. In one exceptional situation, E. coli was found to be infectious: in northern Europe, stool samples and electron microscopy revealed large populations of the amoeba within a group of patients with persistent diarrhea. Some types of treatments may need to be used due to large populations. Some arsenical compounds are shown to treat the trophozoite stage, like carbarsone. Other compounds used to treat large populations of E. coli include diloxanide furoate, and this usually is used in antiamebic therapy.

== See also ==
- Amoebiasis
