= Histolysain =

Histolysin

Identifiers
- EC no.: 3.4.22.35
- CAS no.: 92228-52-9

Databases
- IntEnz: IntEnz view
- BRENDA: BRENDA entry
- ExPASy: NiceZyme view
- KEGG: KEGG entry
- MetaCyc: metabolic pathway
- PRIAM: profile
- PDB structures: RCSB PDB PDBe PDBsum
Search
- PMC: articles
- PubMed: articles
- NCBI: proteins

Histolysin (EC 3.4.22.35, histolysin, Entamoeba histolytica cysteine proteinase, amebapain, Entamoeba histolytica cysteine protease, Entamoeba histolytica neutral thiol proteinase) is an enzyme. This enzyme catalyses the chemical reactions involved in hydrolysis of proteins, including basement membrane collagen and azocasein. Preferential cleavage: Arg-Arg- in small molecule substrates including Z-Arg-Arg-!NHMec. This enzyme is present in the protozoan, Entamoeba histolytica.
