= Dehydroemetine =

Chemical compound

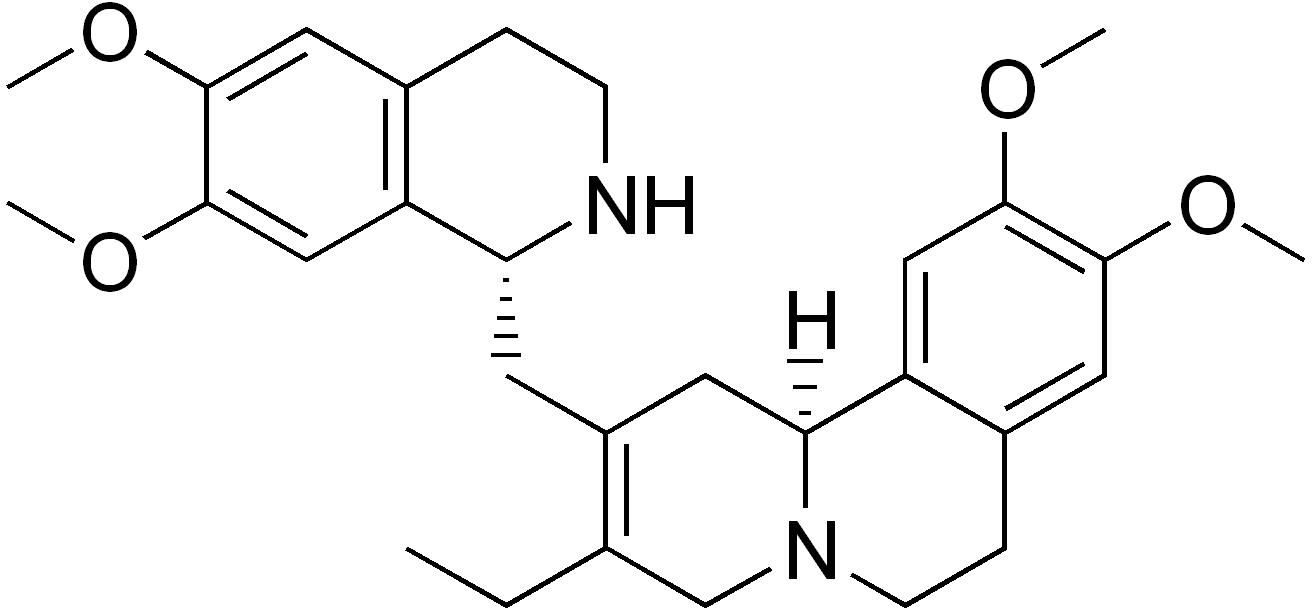

Clinical data
- AHFS/Drugs.com: International Drug Names
- ATC code: P01AX09 (WHO)

Identifiers
- IUPAC name: (11bS)-2-[[(1R)-6,7-Dimethoxy-1,2,3,4-tetrahydroisoquinolin-1-yl]methyl]-3-ethyl-9,10-dimethoxy-4,6,7,11b-tetrahydro-1H-pyrido[2,1-a]isoquinoline
- CAS Number: 4914-30-1
- PubChem CID: 21022
- ChemSpider: 19773
- UNII: 7S79QT1T91
- KEGG: D00828
- ChEBI: CHEBI:4363
- ChEMBL: ChEMBL547470
- CompTox Dashboard (EPA): DTXSID901023600
- ECHA InfoCard: 100.023.220

Chemical and physical data
- Formula: C_{29}H_{38}N_{2}O_{4}
- Molar mass: 478.633 g·mol^{−1}
- 3D model (JSmol): Interactive image
- SMILES: O(c1cc2c(cc1OC)[C@H](NCC2)CC\5=C(/CC)CN4[C@H](c3c(cc(OC)c(OC)c3)CC4)C/5)C
- InChI: InChI=1S/C29H38N2O4/c1-6-18-17-31-10-8-20-14-27(33-3)29(35-5)16-23(20)25(31)12-21(18)11-24-22-15-28(34-4)26(32-2)13-19(22)7-9-30-24/h13-16,24-25,30H,6-12,17H2,1-5H3/t24-,25+/m1/s1; Key:XXLZPUYGHQWHRN-RPBOFIJWSA-N

Dehydroemetine is a synthetically produced antiprotozoal agent similar to emetine in its anti-amoebic properties and structure (they differ only in a double bond next to the ethyl substituent), but it produces fewer side effects. In the United States, it is manufactured by Roche.

== Mechanism ==
Its exact mechanism is not known, but in vitro it inhibits translocation.

== Uses ==
It was at one-time, but is no longer distributed by the Centers for Disease Control on a compassionate use basis as an investigational drug for the treatment of metronidazole-resistant amoebiasis.

=== Amoebic infections ===
Some examples of the use of dehydroemetine in the treatment of amoebic infections include:

1. In 1993, the successful treatment of cutaneous amebiasis in a 7-year-old girl with dehydroemetine and metronidazole in Mexico.
2. A double-blind study of oral dehydroemetine in the treatment of amoebiasis performed at St. Mary's Hospital, Catholic Medical College, Seoul, Republic of Korea in 1973-1974 showed dehydroemetine treatment was effective. A total of 60 patients were treated, 20 with dehydroemetine, 20 with Tiberal, and 20 with metronidazole. One-fourth of the patients treated with dehydroemetine reported adverse reactions, compared to 20% with other drugs, but no patient discontinued therapy due to the reaction. In all three cases, the drug therapy resulted in clearance of the infection, defined as negative results through an O&P exam, in all but 1-2 patients.
1. A 1979 study of 27 patients treated with dehydroemetine and various other drugs suggested all drug combinations were successful at treating amoebic liver abscesses.
2. A 1986 in vitro study compared the effects of dehydroemetine, metronidazole, ornidazole, and secnidazole on Entamoeba histolytica. Metronidazole was found to be most effective, and the other three drugs were of similar effectiveness.

=== In other diseases ===
A 2020 in-vitro study found dehydroemetine to be effective in malaria.

A 1980 report described the use of dehydroemetine in treatment of herpes zoster, a condition which can produce painful neurological symptoms. The study involved 40 patients, all of whom were over 60, and compared dehydroemetine treatment to another drug. The study reported patients treated with dehydroemetine experienced relief of neuralgia with no changes in cardiovascular functions.

Dehydroemetine has been investigated as a treatment for Leishmania infection.
