= Chromatoidal bodies =

Chromatoidal bodies are aggregations of ribosomes found in cysts of some amoebae including Entamoeba histolytica and Entamoeba coli. They exist in the cytoplasm and are dark staining. In the early cystic stages of E. histolytica, chromatid bodies arise from aggregation of ribosomes forming polycrystalline masses. As the cyst matures, the masses fragment into separate particles and the chromatoidal body disappears. It is thought that the chromatoidal body formation is a manifestation of parasite-host adaptive conditions. Ribonucleoprotein is synthesized under favorable conditions, crystallized in the resistant cyst stage and dispersed in the newly excysted amoebae when the amoeba is able to establish itself in a new host.
