= Cutaneous amoebiasis =

- Other names: Aoebiasis cutis
- Specialty: Infectious diseases

Cutaneous amoebiasis, refers to a form of amoebiasis that presents primarily in the skin. It can be caused by Acanthamoeba or Entamoeba histolytica. When associated with Acanthamoeba, it is also known as "cutaneous acanthamoebiasis". Balamuthia mandrillaris can also cause cutaneous amoebiasis, but can prove fatal if the amoeba enters the bloodstream It is characterized by ulcers. Diagnosis of amebiasis cutis calls for high degree of clinical suspicion. This needs to be backed with demonstration of trophozoites from lesions. Unless an early diagnosis can be made such patients can develop significant morbidity.

== See also ==
- Skin lesion
