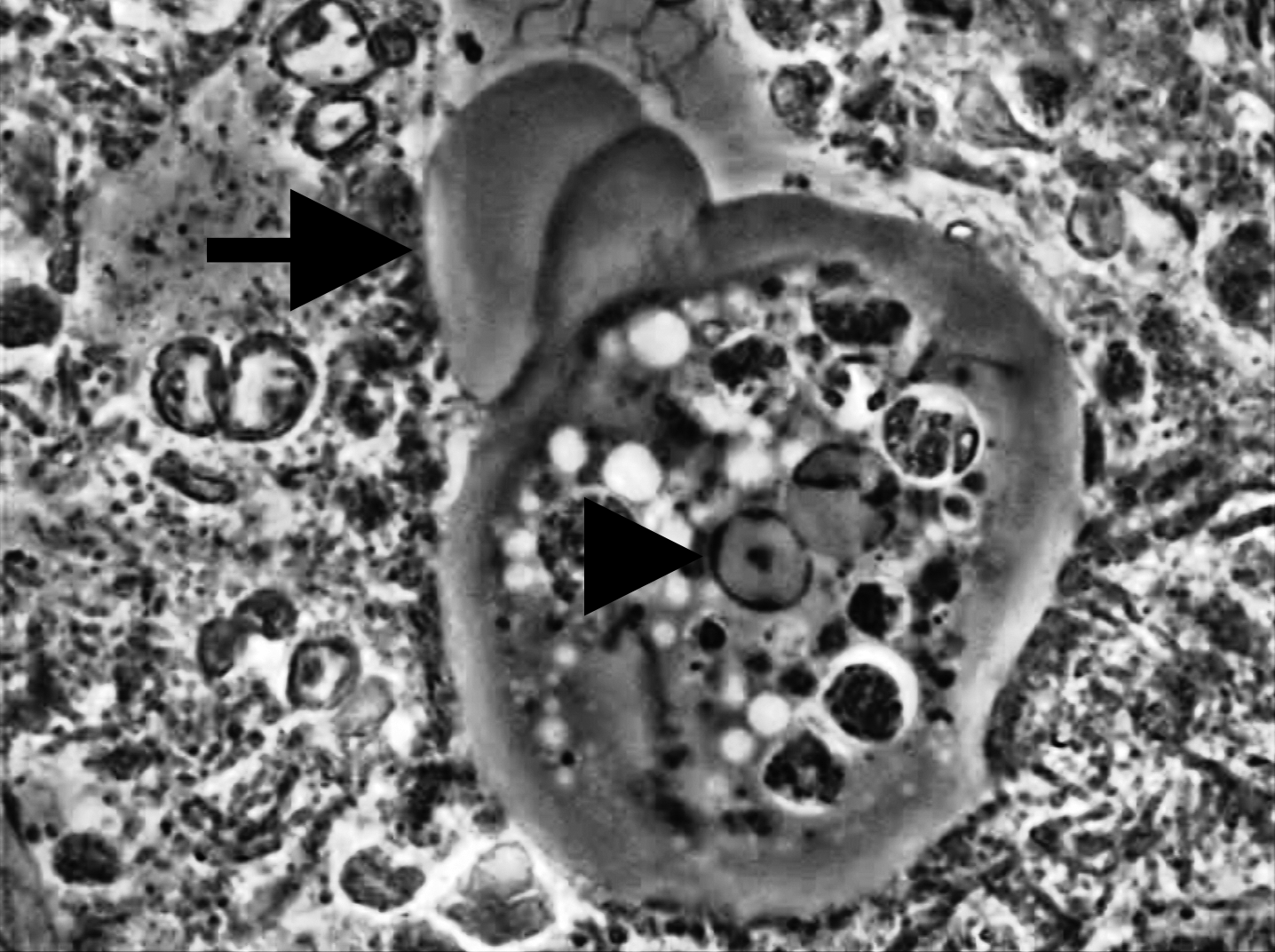
- Entamoeba gingivalis from periodontal pocket

Scientific classification
- Domain: Eukaryota
- Phylum: Amoebozoa
- Family: Entamoebidae
- Genus: Entamoeba
- Species: E. gingivalis

Binomial name
- Entamoeba gingivalis Gros, 1849

= Entamoeba gingivalis =

Species of amoeba

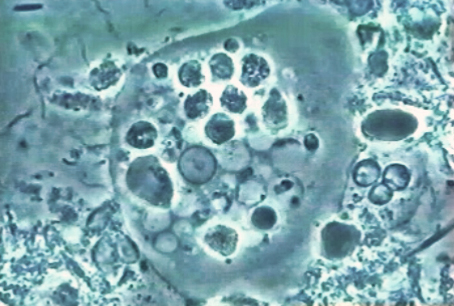
Entamoeba gingivalis from aggressive periodontal disease patient biofilm using phase contrast microscope 1000x. It is recognizable through its dense core in the middle, formed by a central point encircled by a circular halo and surrounded by bigger phagosomes inside a greyish cytoplasm.

Entamoeba gingivalis is an opportunistic Amoebozoa (reported by some as an effect of disease; not a cause [hence status as a commensal]) and is the first amoeba in humans to be described.

It is found in the mouth inside the gingival pocket biofilm near the base of the teeth, and in periodontal pockets. Entamoeba gingivalis is found in 95% of people with gum disease and rarely in people with healthy gums. Cyst formation is not present; therefore transmission is direct from one person to another by kissing, or by sharing eating utensils. Only the trophozoites are formed and the size is usually 20 micrometers to 150 micrometers in diameter. Entamoeba gingivalis have pseudopodia that allow them to move quickly and phagocytise the nucleus of polynuclear neutrophils by exonucleophagy in periodontal disease. Their spheroid nucleus is 2 micrometers to 4 micrometers in diameter and contains a small central endosome. There are numerous food vacuoles, which consists mostly of phagocytosed PMN nucleus, blood cells, and bacteria. It also causes pyorrhoea.

== Media ==
From the top of the image, Entamoeba gingivalis is sipping a white cell nucleus, imperceptibly through negative suction apparently. Halfway through the process, it starts enveloping its prey in the middle, to better digest it in a future phagosome.

The main activity of the amoeba Entamoeba gingivalis in the infected periodontal crevices, besides moving, consists in feeding on the nucleus of white blood cells. The amoeba penetrates into the cytoplasm to reach the nucleus and literally suctions its contents via the negative pressure of the pseudopod. The food so gulped down is gradually digested inside the endoplasm. Phagocytosis can sometimes continue for more than 20 polynuclear neutrophil nuclei. This activity leaves a denucleated cell, unable to achieve either its NETS activity or its preprogrammed apoptosis. It will release PMN-uncontrolled proteolytic enzymes on surrounding tissues and could be considered a pathogen from this vampirising activity.

== See also ==
- Trichomonas tenax
