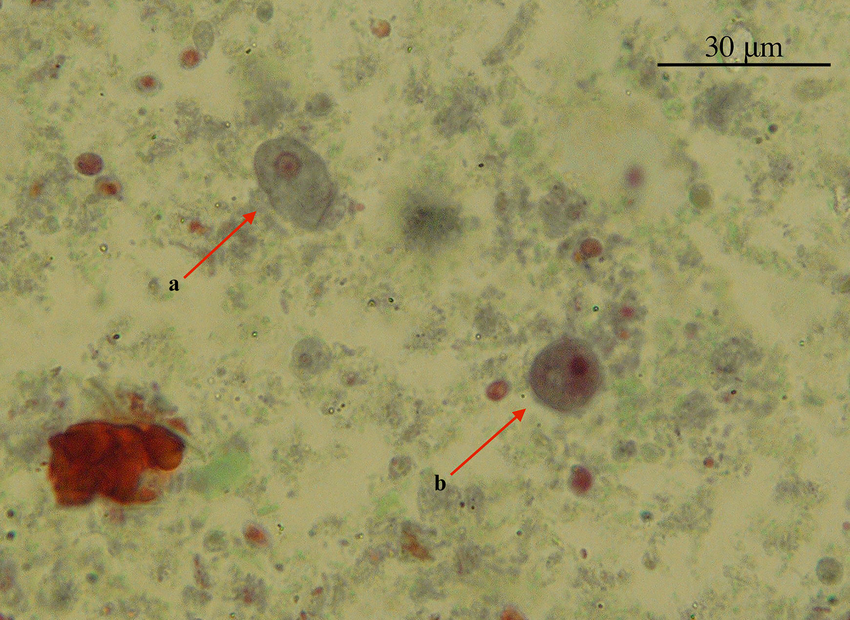

Scientific classification
- Domain: Eukaryota
- Phylum: Amoebozoa
- Family: Entamoebidae
- Genus: Entamoeba
- Species: E. moshkovskii

Binomial name
- Entamoeba moshkovskii Tshalaia, 1941

= Entamoeba moshkovskii =

Species of amoeba

Entamoeba moshkovskii is part of the genus Entamoeba. It is found in areas with polluted water sources, and is prevalent in places such as Malaysia, India, and Bangladesh, but more recently has made its way to Turkey, Australia, and North America. This amoeba is said to rarely infect humans, but recently this has changed. It is in question as to whether it is pathogenic or not. Despite some sources stating this is a free living amoeba, various studies worldwide have shown it contains the ability to infect humans, with some cases of pathogenic potential being reported. Some of the symptoms that often occur are diarrhea, weight loss, bloody stool, and abdominal pain. The first known human infection also known as the "Laredo strain" of Entamoebic mushkovskii was in Laredo, Texas in 1991, although it was first described by a man named Tshalaia in 1941 in Moscow, Russia. It is known to affect people of all ages and genders.

== Symptoms ==
Entamoeba moshkovskiihas been identified in occasionally causing diarrhea with similar severity, duration, and age of onset to diarrhea acquired from E. histolytica. In murine models of mice, E. moshkovskii caused diarrhea, weight loss, and colitis. When children in Bangladesh were tested for intestinal issues, E. moshkovskii infection was associated with diarrhea.

== Characteristics ==
The exact characteristics of Entamoeba moshkovskii are "indistinguishable" from that of Entamoeba histolytica and Entamoeba dispar unless a polymerase chain reaction test is done. This is the only circumstance in which you can distinguish between the three of them.

== Transmission ==
Entamoeba moshkovskii is transmitted by contact or ingestion of any unclean water sources. It is known to be found in areas with polluted water such as brackish coastal pools, river line sediments, and originally sewage. A study from eastern India recorded a moderately high prevalence of Entamoeba moshkovskii infection in pigs.

== Risk factors ==
Risk factors include the use or ingestion of polluted sources of water. Swimming in any areas with polluted water is also a risk. Most of the cases reported are in rural areas.

== Diagnosis ==
Diagnosis with Entamoeba moshkovskii is difficult to do until symptoms appear. The amoeba will form cysts and trophozoites in the gastrointestinal tract. This can cause abdominal pain and diarrhea. Once symptoms start to occur, the standard means of diagnosing are a series of stool sample examinations and serological testing, and, if necessary, a colonoscopy or a biopsy of intestinal amebic legions or draining of liver abscesses (if present). They are checking to see if there is any indication of the amoeba within the feces. In order to do this, several stool smears must be made and carefully observed under the microscope. At this point, if the tests are positive, it will usually come down to three choices for a diagnosis. The choices being Entamoeba moshkovskii, Entamoeba histolytica, or Entamoeba dispar. These three choices are, in the view of the microscope, "indistinguishable". This is the point where a doctor makes the call for what is most common (Entamoeba histolytica) or something more rare (Entamoeba mushkovskii). If they choose to go with what is common, they will treat with "entamoebic chemotherapy". If the decision to treat amoebiasis is made, symptomatic or not, successful results may be reached using luminal agents. If the choice is to further examine the diagnosis, they will have to do a polymerase chain reaction. This is the only way to differentiate between the three amoebas and effectively diagnose.

== Treatment ==
Although treatments are still being researched, there are some ways to treat Entamoebic moshkovskii. Since this particular amoeba is resistant to emitin, they typically treat using an anti-protozoan or antiamoebic therapy. In tropical regions, anyone with cysts in their stool is treated with an anti-protozoan. According to health.harvard.edu, gastrointestinal amoebiasis is treated with nitroimidazole drugs, given orally or intravenously, to clear amoebas found within the blood, wall of the intestine, and the liver. Luminal drugs are used to eliminate the transmissible and air-resistant cyst forms found within the intestines. Nitroimidazole and luminal drugs are paired together when gastrointestinal symptoms caused by amoebiasis are present.

== Prevention ==
Preventive methods are to only utilize clean water sources – whether it be for ingestion, cleaning, or recreation – and good hygiene such as hand-washing.
