= Histolysis =

Breakdown of tissues

Histolysis is the decay and dissolution of organic tissues or of blood. It is sometimes referred to as histodialysis. In cells, histolysis may be caused by uracil-DNA degradation.

Origin: New Latin, from Greek ‘ιστος (histos) tissue + λυσις (lusis) dissolution from λυειν to loosen, dissolve.

Histolysis is associated with metamorphosis as well as other morphological changes. The loss of organs or blood begins with cell death, which can be caused by a number of factors. In frogs, the histolysis of the tail associated with metamorphosis is also associated with a lowering of the pH of the blood. Increases in histolysis has been found to correspond with the pupal phase of insect metamorphosis, wherein larval organs break down before the histogenesis of the adult tissues occur. The histolysis is associated with an increase in the production of ATP and a decrease in metabolism.
