= Ameboma =

Infectious disease

An ameboma, also known as an amebic granuloma, is a rare complication of Entamoeba histolytica infection, where in response to the infecting amoeba there is formation of annular colonic granulation, which results in a large local lesion of the bowel.

== Presentation ==
The ameboma may manifest as a right lower quadrant abdominal mass, which may be mistaken for carcinoma, tuberculosis, Crohn's disease, actinomycosis, or lymphoma.

== Diagnosis ==
Biopsy is necessary for definitive diagnosis.
