= Endamoeba =

Scientific classification
- Domain: Eukaryota
- Phylum: Amoebozoa
- Family: Entamoebidae
- Genus: Endamoeba; J. Leidy, 1879

Type species
- Endamoeba blattae (Bütschli 1878) Leidy 1879

Synonyms
- Endamoeba (Placoidia) Morris 1936; Endamoeba (Poneramoeba) Lühe 1909; Loeschia Chatton & Lalung-Bonnaire 1912; Proctamoeba Aléxéieff 1912; Viereckia Chatton & Lalung-Bonnaire 1912

Genus of amoeboids in Amoebozoa

Endamoeba is a genus of amoeboids in Amoebozoa. It includes the species Endamoeba blattae (type species), Endamoeba lutea, and Endamoeba similans.
