= Karyosome =

Chromatin bundle in cell nuclei

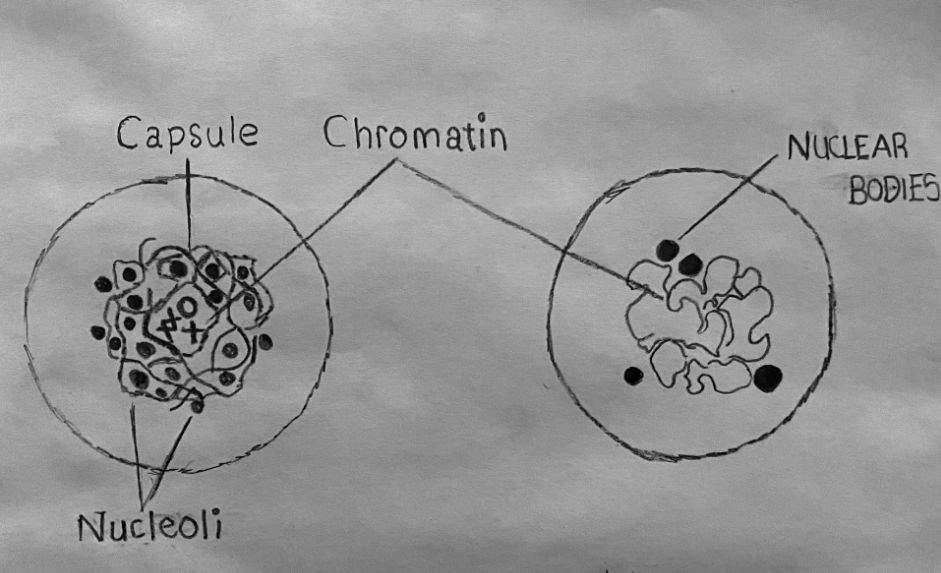
(Left Side) A karyosome with a capsule. (Right Side) A karyosome without a capsule.

A karyosome or karyosphere is a dense bundle of chromatin inside the nucleus of a cell within an organism. These bundles are joined in a limited nuclear volume, but this only happens when the cell is not undergoing meiotic division. Research suggests that within its bundles there is an absence of RNA synthesis occurring in the karyosphere. This suggests that RNA is actively being carried out within meiosis, especially throughout the first and second prophase of meiotic division.

== Formation and function ==
Karyosomes are formed in several animal classes and have a role in oogenesis, a vital process in female gamete development. The gametes can only develop if the mother has oocytes, that are rich in cytoplasm, maternal proteins and contain karyosomes.

Karyosomes are known to be very organized. Any mutation that alters the formation and alignment of karyosomes can lead to defects of an oocyte. Defects can also occur with the absence of nucleosomal histone kinase-1. NHK-1 is a kinase that is essential for all karyosomes, for their maintenance and overall formation. NHK-1 is conserved from nematodes to humans. In the absence of NHK-1, karyosome patterns will fall apart within the female's oocyte, and this disruption will lead to problems previously mentioned. There are other causes of mutations, however they are not fully understood.

The formation of karyosomes is still unclear, but NHK-1 substrates may help understand how the karyosome forms during female meiosis.

Even though the molecular pathway for this process is to be confirmed, it is known that karyosomes tend to formulate at different stages for different organisms. In insects this occurs in the diplotene stage, a prolonged segment that crosses over genes between homologous chromosomes, and aids in the creation of gametes. For example, this occurs within Drosophila oocytes. The formation of karyosomes during this period are based on a ratio. This ratio is dependent on the potential size of an organism, meaning that typically larger organisms will have bigger karyosomes. In other words, a typical Drosophila oocyte is 20 μm in diameter with karyosomes each expected to be about 1 μm in diameter.

Structures called karyosomes are present in the nuclei of certain Entamoeba species.

== Karyosome capsule ==
As oogenesis continues, the karyosome is typically covered by a sheath, known as a capsule. These capsules are created from the interaction between nuclear structures, the nuclear membrane and chromosomes. Karyosomes can also form without a capsule, such as in Drosophila. The function and molecular composition of karyosome capsules are quite unknown. It has been suggested that these capsules may be a storage site for nuclear ribonucleoprotein particles. Therefore, the absence of this capsule within certain organisms may demonstrate a reduction in small nuclear proteins and RNA.
