= Fyodor Lesh =

Fyodor Alexandrovich Lesh, alternatively spelled as Lösch (Russian: Фёдор Александрович Леш; 1840–1903), was a Russian medical doctor.

He is credited with identifying Amoeba coli in 1875. This species was later classified in the genus Entamoeba.
