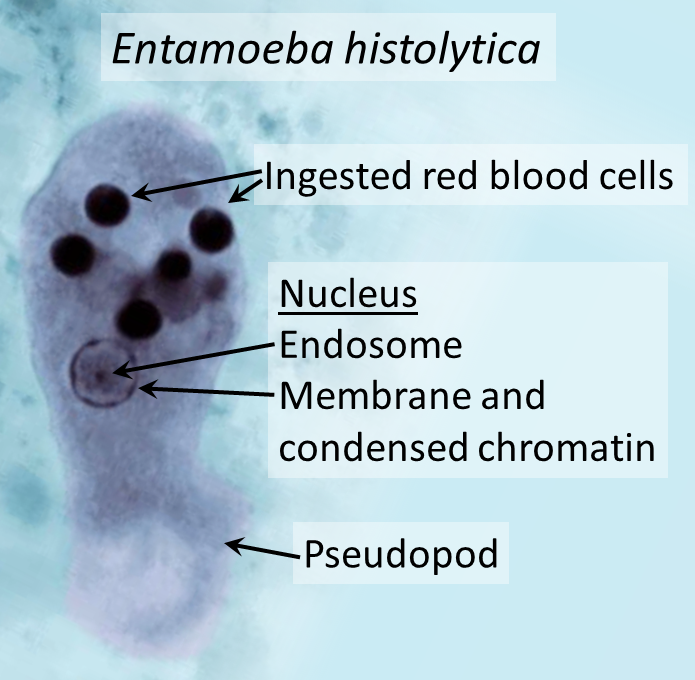
- Entamoeba histolytica trophozoite

Scientific classification
- Domain: Eukaryota
- Supergroup: Amorphea
- Phylum: Amoebozoa
- Class: Archamoebea
- Order: Entamoebida
- Family: Entamoebidae
- Genus: Entamoeba
- Species: E. histolytica

Binomial name
- Entamoeba histolytica Schaudinn, 1903

= Entamoeba histolytica =

Anaerobic parasitic protist

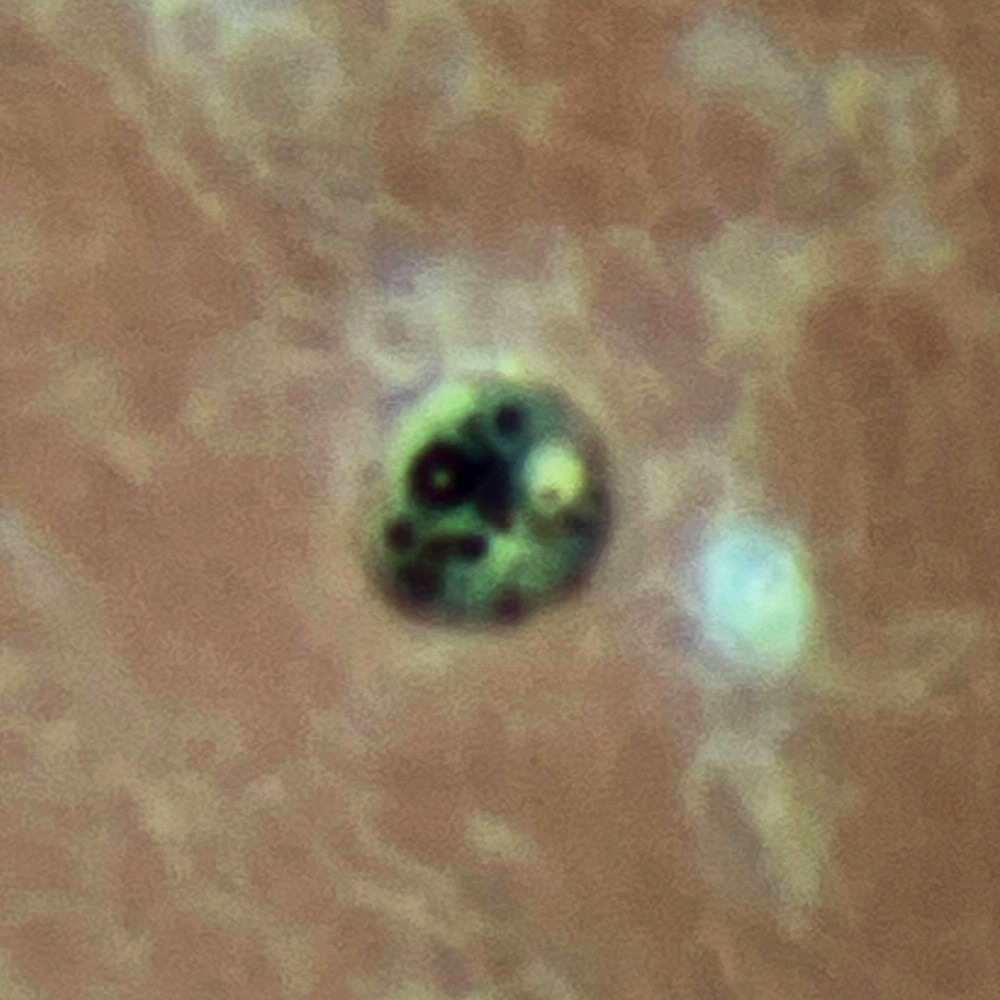
Entamoeba histolytica in peripheral blood

Life-cycle of Entamoeba histolytica

Entamoeba histolytica is an anaerobic parasitic amoebozoan, part of the genus Entamoeba. Predominantly infecting humans and other primates causing amoebiasis, E. histolytica is estimated to infect about 35–50 million people worldwide. E. histolytica infection is estimated to kill more than 55,000 people each year. Previously, it was thought that 10% of the world population was infected, but these figures predate the recognition that at least 90% of these infections were due to a second species, E. dispar. Mammals such as dogs and cats can become infected transiently, but are not thought to contribute significantly to transmission.

The word histolysis literally means disintegration and dissolution of organic tissues.

== Transmission ==
The active (trophozoite) stage exists only in the host and in fresh loose feces; cysts survive outside the host in water, in soils, and on foods, especially under moist conditions on the latter. The infection can occur when a person puts anything into their mouth that has touched the feces of a person who is infected with E. histolytica, swallows something, such as water or food, that is contaminated with E. histolytica, or swallows E. histolytica cysts (eggs) picked up from contaminated surfaces or fingers. The cysts are readily killed by heat and by freezing temperatures; they survive for only a few months outside of the host. When cysts are swallowed, they cause infections by excysting (releasing the trophozoite stage) in the digestive tract. The pathogenic nature of E. histolytica was first reported by Fedor A. Lösch in 1875, but it was not given its Latin name until Fritz Schaudinn described it in 1903. E. histolytica, as its name suggests (histo–lytic = tissue destroying), is pathogenic; infection can be asymptomatic, or it can lead to amoebic dysentery or amoebic liver abscess. Symptoms can include fulminating dysentery, bloody diarrhea, weight loss, fatigue, abdominal pain, and amoeboma. The amoeba can 'bore' into the intestinal wall, causing lesions and intestinal symptoms, and it may reach the bloodstream or peritoneal cavity. From there, it can reach vital organs of the human body, usually the liver, but sometimes the lungs, brain, and spleen. A common outcome of this invasion of tissues is a liver abscess, which can be fatal if untreated. Ingested red blood cells are sometimes seen in the amoeba cell cytoplasm.

== Risk factors ==
Poor sanitary conditions are known to increase the risk of contracting amebiasis E. histolytica. In the United States, there is a much higher rate of amebiasis-related mortality in California and Texas (this might be caused by the proximity of those states to E. histolytica-endemic areas, such as Mexico), parts of Latin America, and Asia. E. histolytica is also recognized as an emerging sexually transmissible pathogen, especially in male homosexual relations, causing outbreaks in non-endemic regions. As such, high-risk sex behaviour is also a potential source of infection. Although it is unclear whether there is a causal link, studies indicate a higher chance of being infected with E. histolytica if one is also infected with human immunodeficiency virus (HIV).

== Genome ==
The E. histolytica genome was sequenced, assembled, and automatically annotated in 2005. The genome was reassembled and reannotated in 2010. The 20 million basepair genome assembly contains 8,160 predicted genes; known and novel transposable elements have been mapped and characterized, functional assignments have been revised and updated, and additional information has been incorporated, including metabolic pathways, Gene Ontology assignments, curation of transporters, and generation of gene families. The major group of transposable elements in E. histolytica are non-LTR retrotransposons. These have been divided in three families called EhLINEs and EhSINEs (EhLINE1,2,3 and EhSINE1,2,3). EhLINE1 encodes an endonuclease (EN) protein (in addition to reverse transcriptase and nucleotide-binding ORF1), which has similarity with bacterial restriction endonuclease. This similarity with bacterial protein indicates that transposable elements have been acquired from prokaryotes by horizontal gene transfer in this protozoan parasite.

The genome of E. histolytica has been found to have snoRNAs with opisthokont-like features. The E. histolytica U3 snoRNA (Eh_U3 snoRNA) has shown sequence and structural features similar to Homo sapiens U3 snoRNA.

== Pathogen interaction ==
E. histolytica may modulate the virulence of certain human viruses and is itself a host for its own viruses.

For example, acquired immunodeficiency syndrome (AIDS) accentuates the damage and pathogenicity of E. histolytica. On the other hand, cells infected with HIV are often consumed by E. histolytica. Infective HIV remains viable within the amoeba, although there has been no proof of human reinfection from amoeba carrying this virus.

A burst of research on viruses of E. histolytica stems from a series of papers published by Diamond et al. from 1972 to 1979. In 1972, they hypothesized two separate polyhedral and filamentous viral strains within E. histolytica that caused cell lysis. Perhaps the most novel observation was that two kinds of viral strains existed and that within one type of amoeba (strain HB-301), the polyhedral strain had no detrimental effect but led to cell lysis in another (strain HK-9). Although Mattern et al. attempted to explore the possibility that these protozoal viruses could function like bacteriophages, they found no significant changes in Entamoeba histolytica virulence when infected by viruses.

== Immunopathogenesis ==
E. histolytica causes tissue destruction which leads to clinical disease. E. histolytica induces tissue damage by three main events: direct host cell death, inflammation, and parasite invasion. Once the trophozoites are excysted in the terminal ileum region, they colonize the large bowel, remaining on the surface of the mucus layer and feeding on bacteria and food particles. Occasionally, and in response to unknown stimuli, trophozoites move through the mucus layer where they come in contact with the epithelial cell layer and start the pathological process. E. histolytica has a lectin that binds to galactose and N-acetylgalactosamine sugars on the surface of the epithelial cells, The lectin normally is used to bind bacteria for ingestion. The parasite has several enzymes such as pore-forming proteins, lipases, and cysteine proteases, which are normally used to digest bacteria in food vacuoles but which can cause lysis of the epithelial cells by inducing cellular necrosis and apoptosis when the trophozoite comes in contact with them and binds via the lectin. Enzymes released allow penetration into the intestinal wall and blood vessels, sometimes onto the liver and other organs. The trophozoites will then ingest these dead cells. This damage to the epithelial cell layer attracts human immune cells and these in turn can be lysed by the trophozoite, which releases the immune cell's lytic enzymes into the surrounding tissue, creating a type of chain reaction and leading to tissue destruction. This destruction manifests itself in the form of an 'ulcer' in the tissue, typically described as flask-shaped because of its appearance in the transverse section. This tissue destruction can also involve blood vessels leading to bloody diarrhea, and amebic dysentery. Occasionally, trophozoites enter the bloodstream where they are transported typically to the liver via the portal system. In the liver a similar pathological sequence ensues, leading to amebic liver abscesses. The trophozoites can also end up in other organs, sometimes via the bloodstream, sometimes via liver abscess rupture or fistulas. Similarly, when the trophozoites travel to the brain, they can cause amoebic brain abscesses.

== Diagnosis ==
Diagnosis is confirmed by microscopic examination for trophozoites or cysts in fresh or suitably preserved fecal specimens, smears of aspirates or scrapings obtained by proctoscopy, and aspirates of abscesses or another tissue specimen. A blood test is also available, but it is recommended only when a healthcare provider believes the infection may have spread beyond the intestine to some other organ of the body, such as the liver. However, this blood test may not help diagnose current illness, because the test can be positive if the patient has had amebiasis in the past, even if they are not infected at the time of the test. Stool antigen detection and PCR are available for diagnosis, and are more sensitive and specific than microscopy.

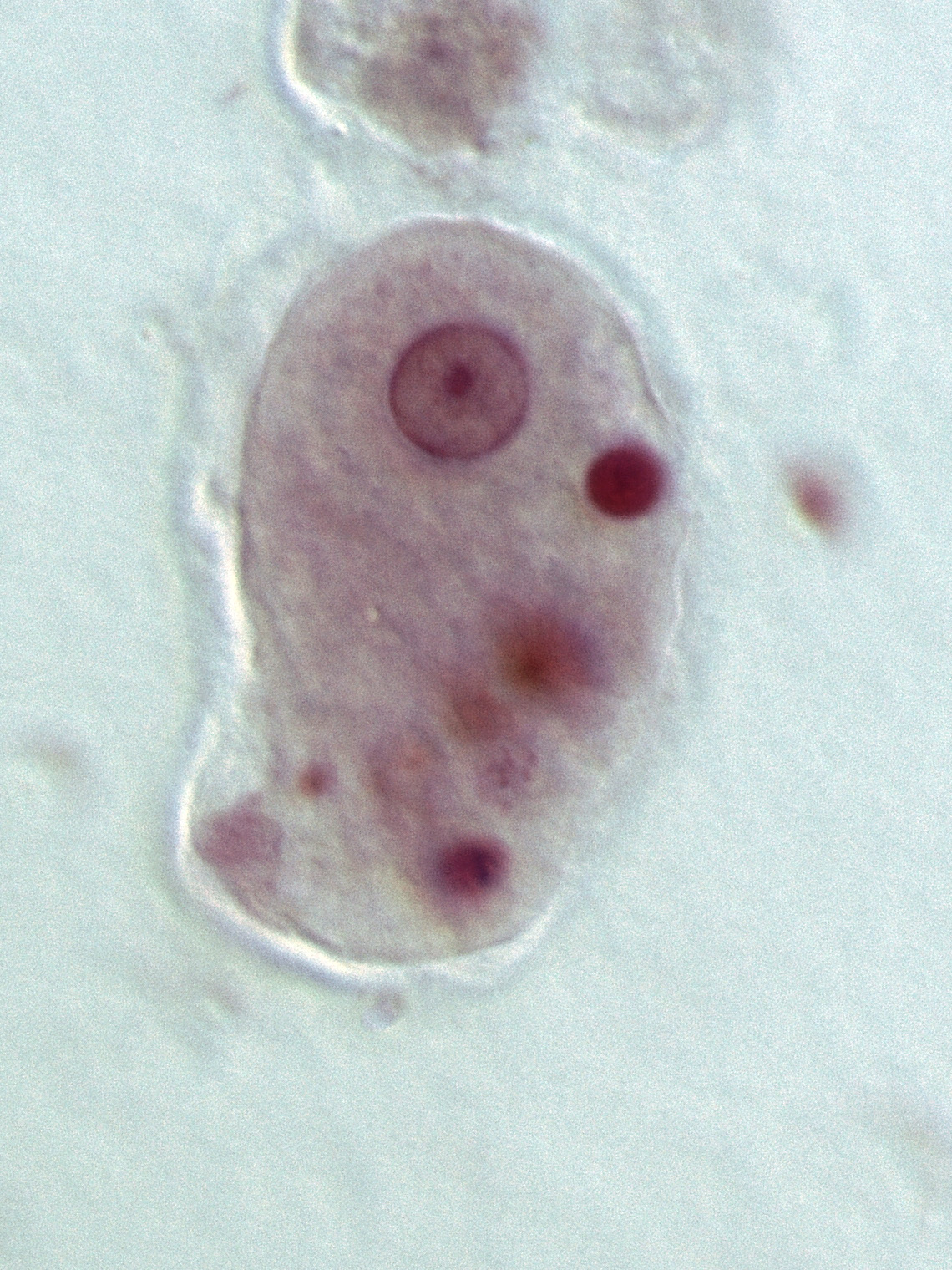
Entamoeba histolytica trophozoite

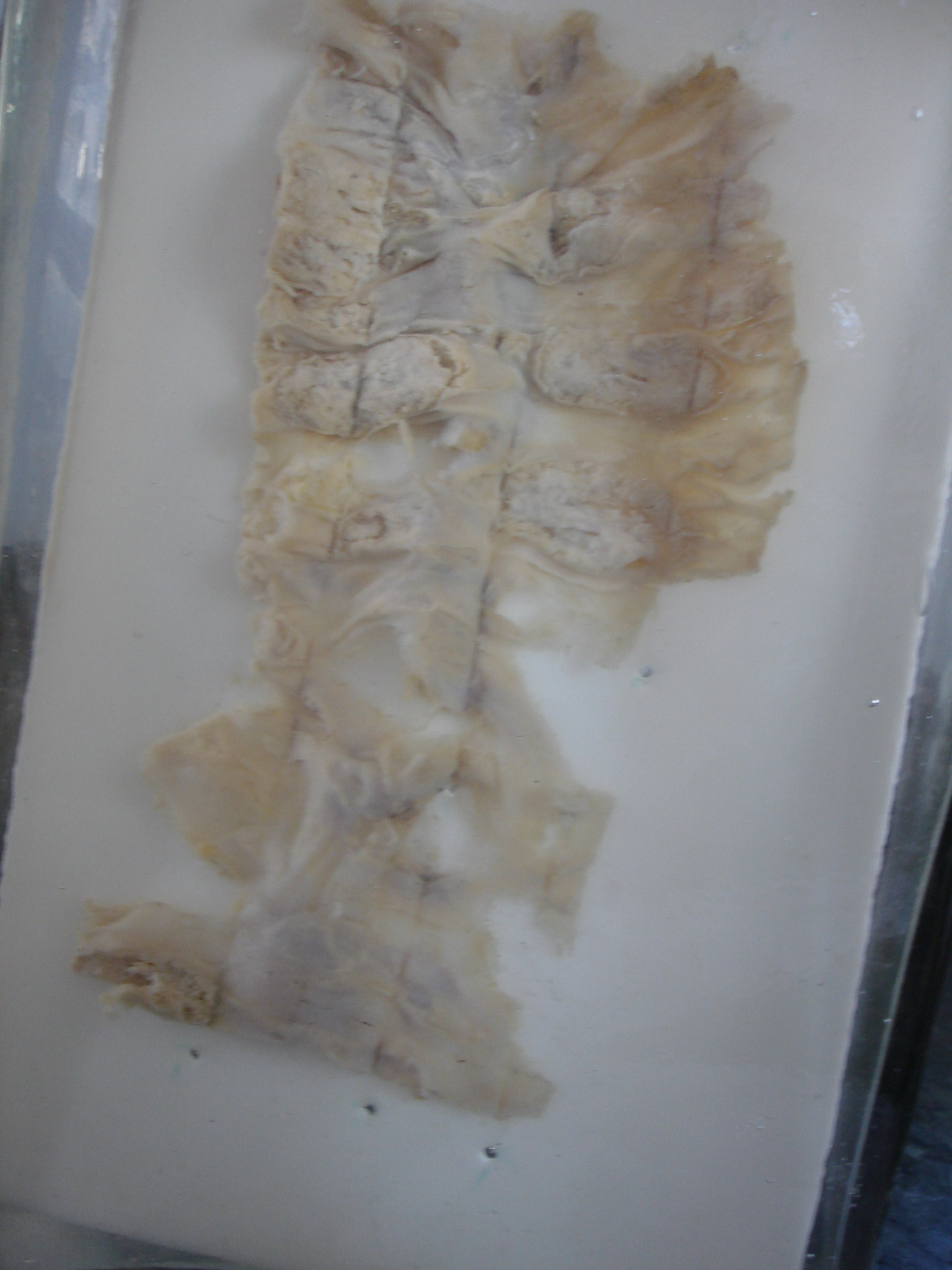
Amoebic intestinal ulcer caused by E. histolytica

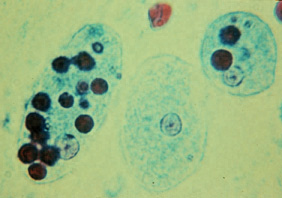
Trophozoites of E. histolytica with ingested erythrocytes

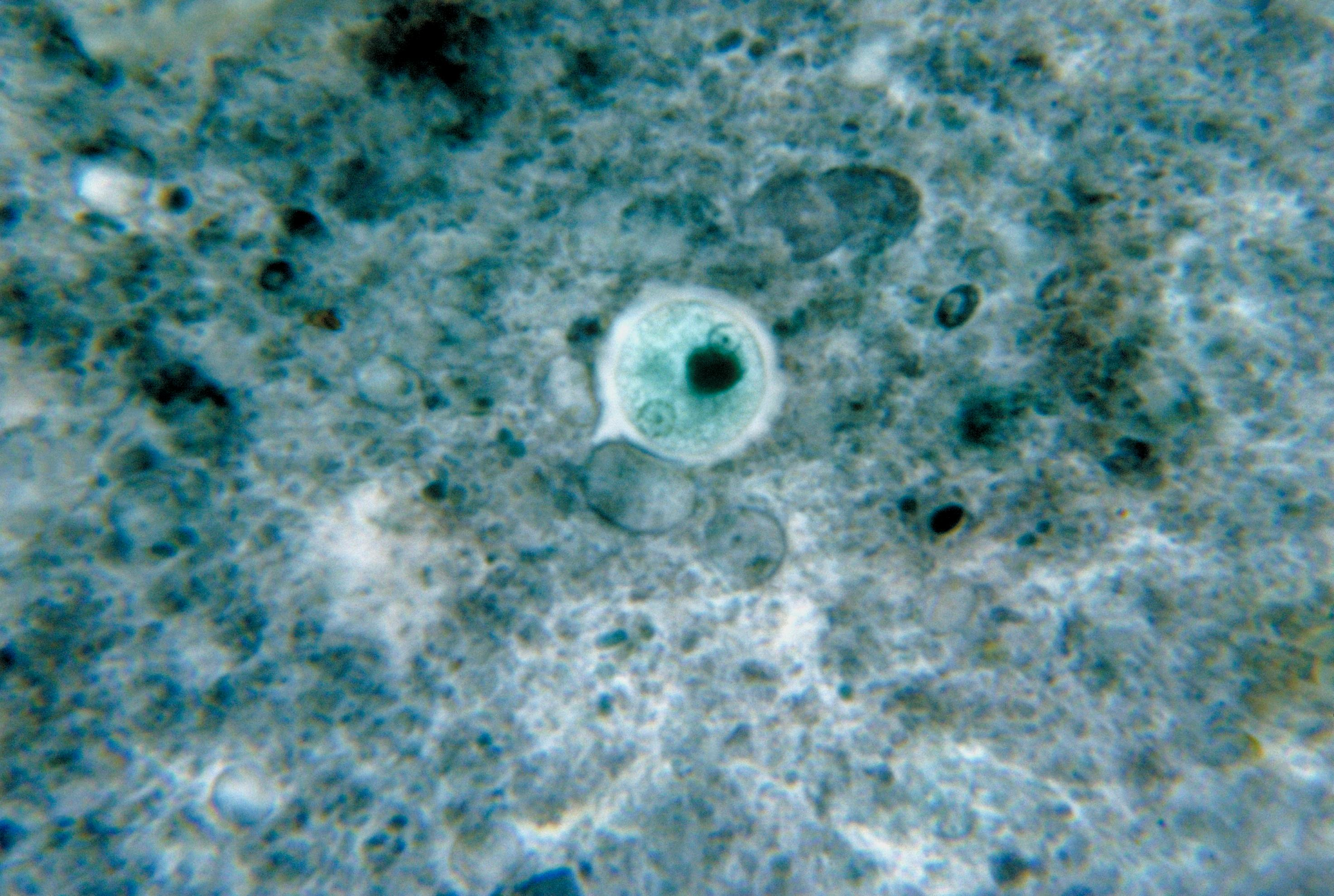
E. histolytica cyst

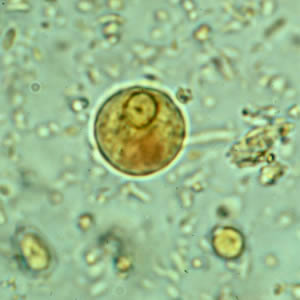
Immature E. histolytica cyst (mature cysts have four nuclei)

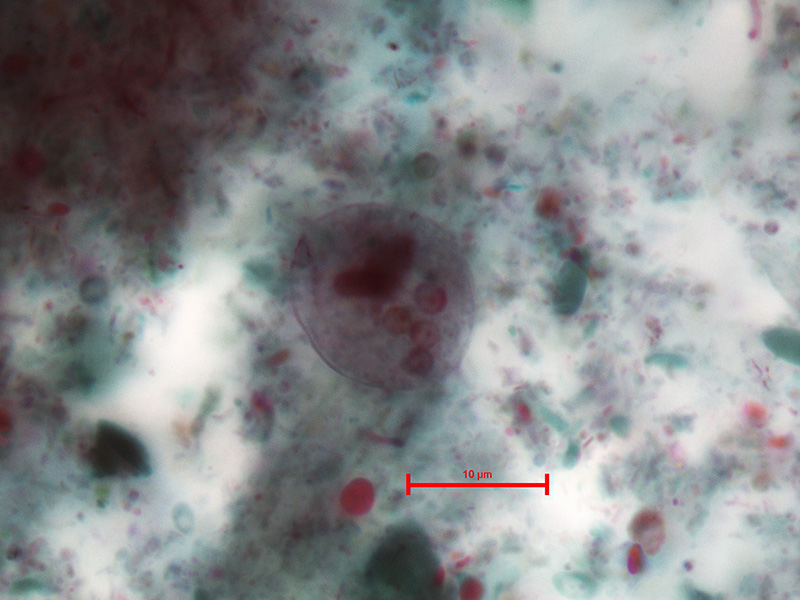
E. histolytica quadrinucleate cyst with chromatoid bodies.

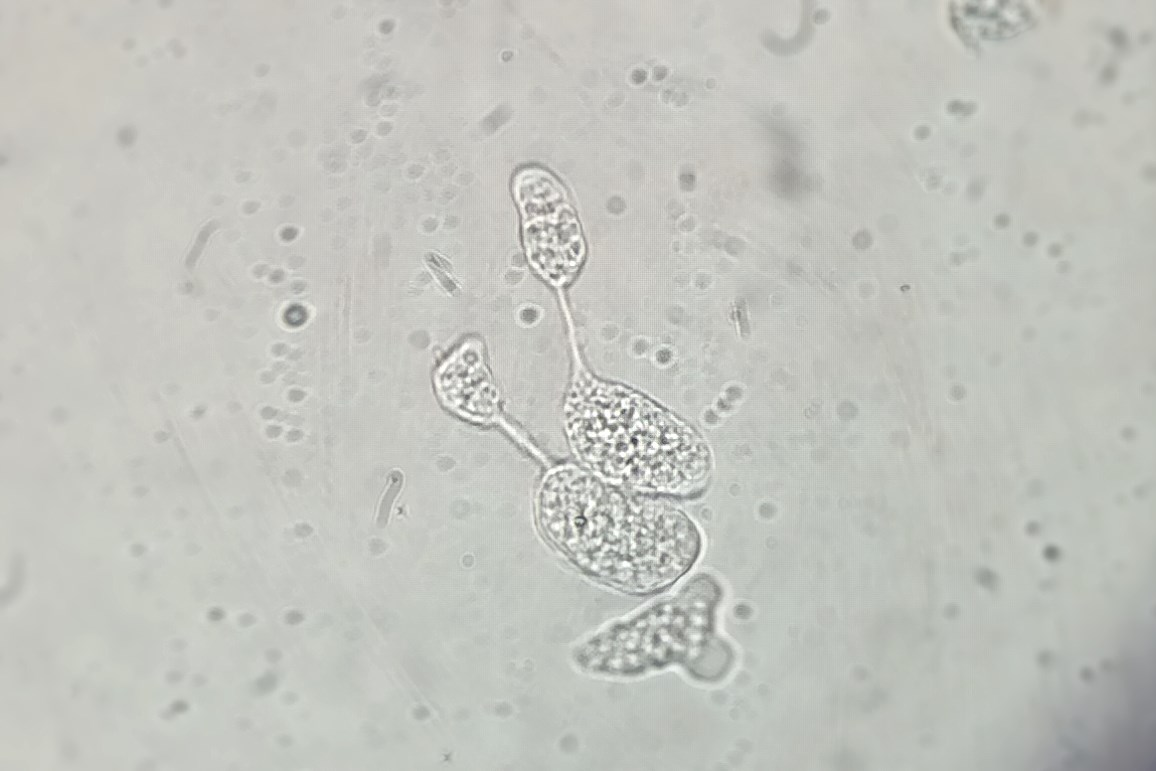
Multiplication by binary fission

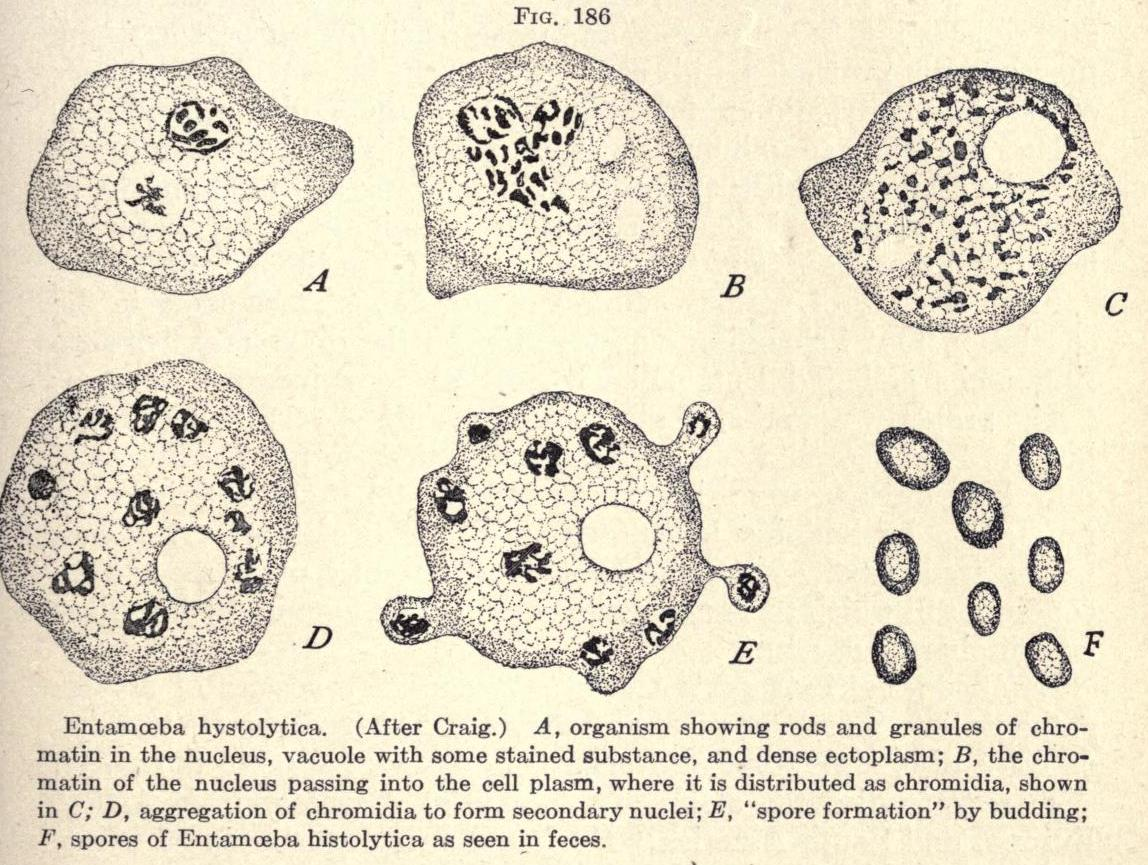
E. histolytica drawing

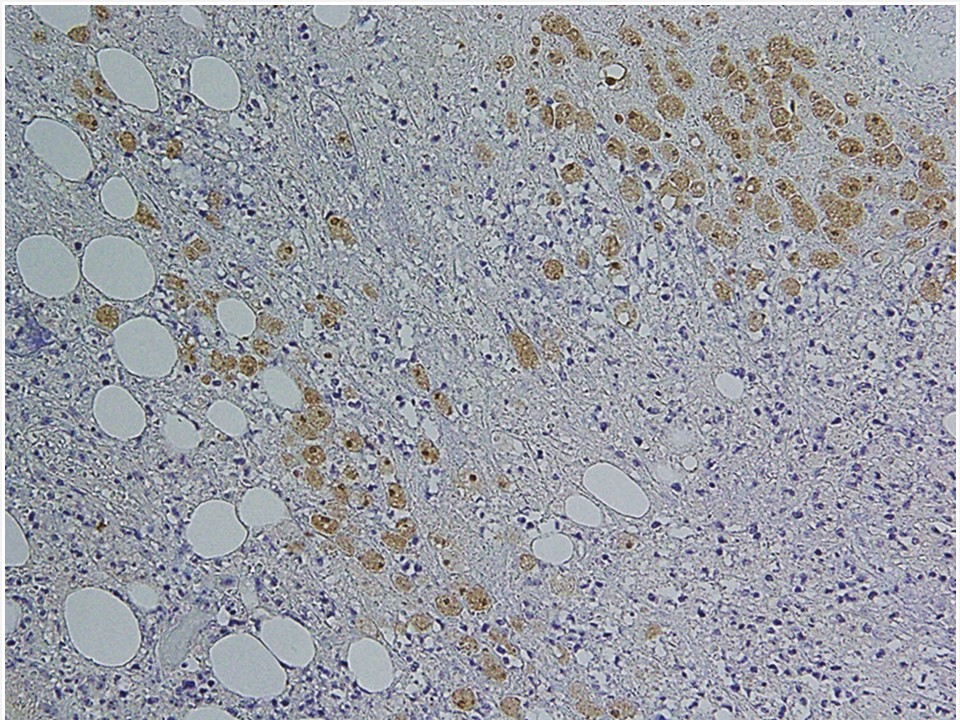
Immunohistochemical staining of trophozoites (brown) using specific anti–Entamoeba histolytica macrophage migration inhibitory factor antibodies in a patient with amebic colitis

== Treatment ==
Several antibiotics are available to treat Entamoeba histolytica. The infected individual will be treated with only one antibiotic if the E. histolytica infection has not made the person sick, and will most likely be prescribed two antibiotics if the person has been feeling sick. Otherwise, below are other options for treatments.

=== Intestinal infection ===
Usually nitroimidazole derivatives (such as metronidazole) are used, because they are highly effective against the trophozoite form of the amoeba. Since they have little effect on amoeba cysts, usually this treatment is followed by an agent (such as paromomycin or diloxanide furoate) that acts on the organism in the lumen.

=== Liver abscess ===
In addition to targeting organisms in solid tissue, primarily with drugs like metronidazole and chloroquine, treatment of liver abscess must include agents that act in the lumen of the intestine (as in the preceding paragraph) to avoid re-invasion. Surgical drainage is usually not necessary, except when rupture is imminent.

=== People without symptoms ===
People without symptoms, otherwise known as asymptomatic carriers, in non-endemic areas, should be treated with paromomycin; other treatments include diloxanide furoate, and iodoquinol. There have been problems with the use of iodoquinol and iodochlorhydroxyquin, so their use is not recommended. Diloxanide furoate can also be used by mildly symptomatic persons who are just passing cysts.

Genus and species	Entamoeba histolytica
Etiologic agent of:	Amoebiasis; amoebic dysentery; extraintestinal amoebiasis, usually amoebic liver abscess; "anchovy sauce"); amoeba cutis; amoebic lung abscess ("liver-colored sputum")
Infective stage	Tetranucleated cyst (having 2–4 nuclei)
Definitive host	Human
Portal of entry	Mouth
Mode of transmission	Ingestion of mature cyst through contaminated food or water
Habitat	Colon and cecum
Pathogenic stage	Trophozoite
Locomotive apparatus	Pseudopodia ("false foot"")
Motility	Active, progressive and directional
Nucleus	'Ring and dot' appearance: peripheral chromatin and central karyosome
Mode of reproduction	Binary fission
Pathogenesis	Lytic necrosis (it looks like "flask-shaped" holes in Gastrointestinal tract sections (GIT)
Type of encystment	Protective and Reproductive
Lab diagnosis	Most common is direct fecal smear (DFS) and staining (but does not allow identification to species level); enzyme immunoassay (EIA); indirect hemagglutination (IHA); Antigen detection – monoclonal antibody; PCR for species identification. Sometimes only the use of a fixative (formalin) is effective in detecting cysts. Culture: From faecal samples – Robinson's medium, Jones' medium
Treatment	Metronidazole for the invasive trophozoites PLUS a lumenal amoebicide for those still in the intestine. Paromomycin (Humatin) is the luminal drug of choice, since Diloxanide furoate (Furamide) is not commercially available in the United States or Canada (being available only from the Centers for Disease Control and Prevention). A direct comparison of efficacy showed that Paromomycin had a higher cure rate. Paromomycin (Humatin) should be used with caution in patients with colitis, as it is both nephrotoxic and ototoxic. Absorption through the damaged wall of the intestinal tract can result in permanent hearing loss and kidney damage. Recommended dosage: metronidazole 750 mg three times a day orally, for 5 to 10 days followed by paromomycin 30 mg/kg/day orally in 3 equal doses for 5 to 10 days or Diloxanide furoate 500 mg 3 times a day orally for 10 days, to eradicate lumenal amoebae and prevent relapse.
Trophozoite stage
Pathognomonic/diagnostic feature	Ingested RBC; distinctive nucleus
Cyst Stage
Chromatoidal body	'Cigar' shaped bodies (made up of crystalline ribosomes)
Number of nuclei	1 in early stages, 4 when mature
Pathognomonic/diagnostic feature	'Ring and dot' nucleus and chromatoid bodies

== Meiosis ==
In sexually reproducing eukaryotes, homologous recombination (HR) ordinarily occurs during meiosis. The meiosis-specific recombinase, Dmc1, is required for efficient meiotic HR, and Dmc1 is expressed in E. histolytica. The purified Dmc1 from E. histolytica forms presynaptic filaments and catalyzes ATP-dependent homologous DNA pairing and DNA strand exchange over at least several thousand base pairs. The DNA pairing and strand exchange reactions are enhanced by the eukaryotic meiosis-specific recombination accessory factor (heterodimer) Hop2-Mnd1. These processes are central to meiotic recombination, suggesting that E. histolytica undergoes meiosis.

Several other genes involved in both mitotic and meiotic HR are also present in E. histolytica. HR is enhanced under stressful growth conditions (serum starvation) concomitant with the up-regulation of HR-related genes. Also, UV irradiation induces DNA damage in E. histolytica trophozoites and activates the recombinational DNA repair pathway. In particular, expression of the Rad51 protein (a recombinase) is increased about 15-fold by UV treatment.

== See also ==
- List of parasites (human)
