= Microbial cyst =

Resting or dormant stage of a microorganism

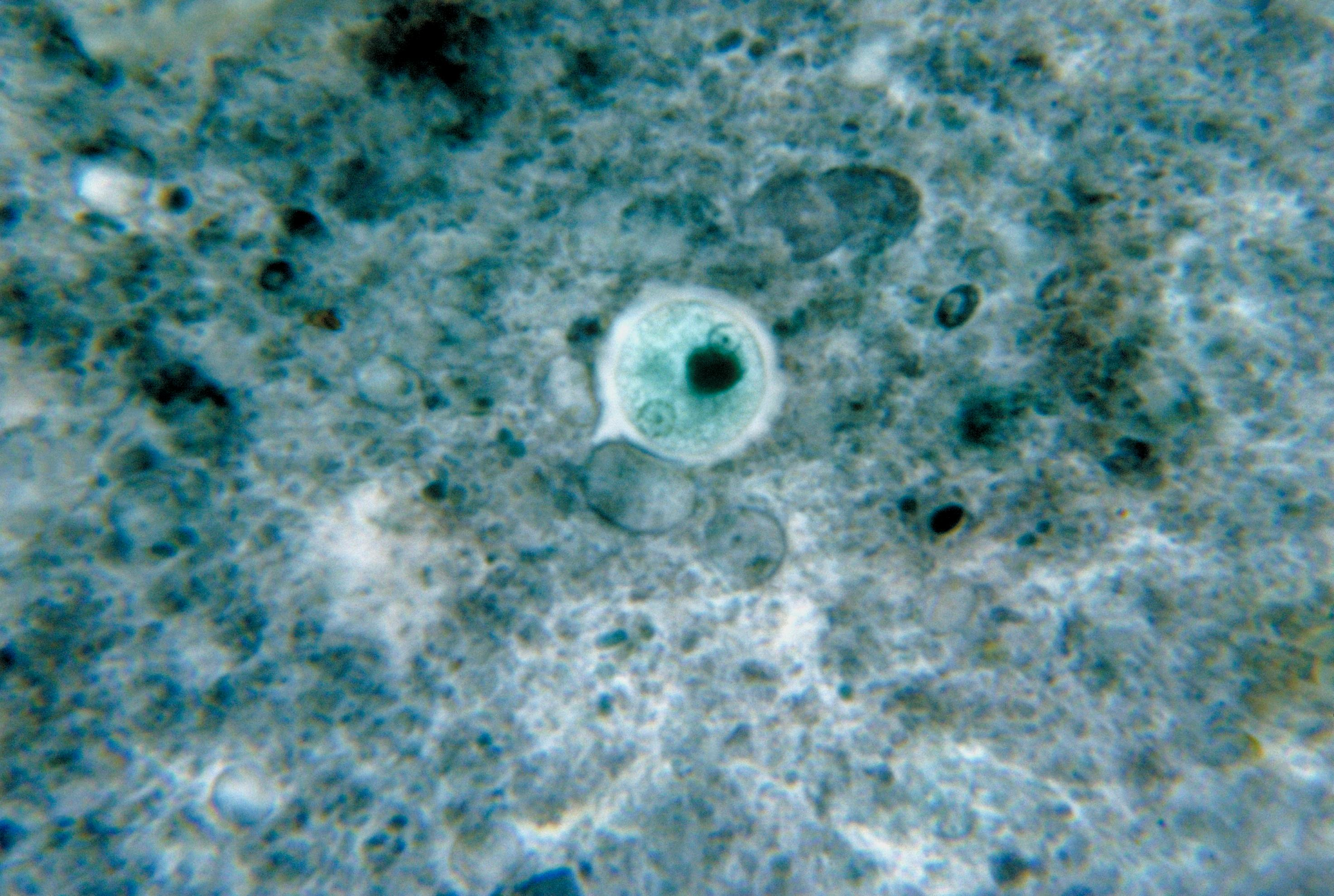
Cyst stage of Entamoeba histolytica

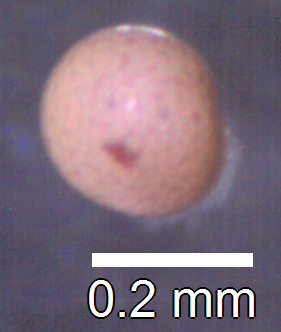
Cyst of Artemia salina

A microbial cyst is a resting or dormant stage of a microorganism, that can be thought of as a state of suspended animation in which the metabolic processes of the cell are slowed and the cell ceases all activities like feeding and locomotion. Many groups of single-celled, microscopic organisms, or microbes, possess the ability to enter this dormant state.

Encystment, the process of cyst formation, can function as a method for dispersal and as a way for an organism to survive in unfavorable environmental conditions. These two functions can be combined when a microbe needs to be able to survive harsh conditions between habitable environments (such as between hosts) in order to disperse. Cysts can also be sites for nuclear reorganization and cell division, and in parasitic species they are often the infectious stage between hosts. When the encysted microbe reaches an environment favorable to its growth and survival, the cyst wall breaks down by a process known as excystation.

Environmental conditions that may trigger encystment include, but are not limited to: lack of nutrients or oxygen, extreme temperatures, desiccation, adverse pH, and presence of toxic chemicals which are not conducive for the growth of the microbe.

== History and terminology ==
The idea that microbes could temporarily assume an alternative state of being to withstand changes in environmental conditions began with Antonie van Leeuwenhoek’s 1702 study on Animalcules, currently known as rotifers:

“'I have often placed the Animalcules I have before described out of the water, not leaving the quantity of a grain of sand adjoining to them, in order to see whether when all the water about them was evaporated and they were exposed to the air their bodies would burst, as I had often seen in other Animalcules. But now I found that when almost all the water was evaporated, so that the creature could no longer be covered with water, nor move itself as usual, it then contracted itself into an oval figure, and in that state it remained, nor could I perceive that the moisture evaporated from its body, for it preserved its oval and round shape, unhurt."

Leeuwenhoek later continued his work with rotifers to discover that when he returned the dried bodies to their preferred aquatic conditions, they resumed their original shape and began swimming again. These observations did not gain traction with the general microbiological community of the time, and the phenomena as Leeuwenhoek observed it was never given a name.

In 1743, John Turberville Needham observed the revival of the encysted larval stage of the wheat parasite, Anguillulina tritici and later published these findings in New Microscopal Discoveries (1745). Several others repeated and expanded upon this work, informally referring to their studies on the “phenomenon of reviviscence.”

In the late 1850s, reviviscence became embroiled in the debate surrounding the theory of spontaneous generation of life, leading two highly involved scientists on either side of the issue to call upon the Biological Society of France for an independent review of their opposing conclusions on the matter. Doyere, who believed rotifers could be desiccated and revitalized, and Pouchet, who believed they could not, allowed independent observers of various scientific backgrounds to observe and attempt to replicate their findings. The resulting report leaned toward the arguments made by Pouchet, with notable dissension from the main author who blamed his framing of the issue in the report on fear of religious retribution. Despite the attempt by Doyere and Pouchet to conclude debate on the topic of resurrection, investigations continued.

In 1872, Wilhelm Preyer introduced the term ‘anabiosis’ (return to life) to describe the revitalization of viable, lifeless organisms to an active state. This was quickly followed by Schmidt’s 1948 proposal of the term ‘abiosis,’ leading to some confusion between terms describing the beginning of life from non-living elements, viable lifelessness, and nonliving components that are necessary for life.

As part of his 1959 review of Leeuwenhoek’s original findings and the evolution of the science surrounding microbial cysts and other forms of metabolic suspension, D. Keilin proposed the term ‘cryptobiosis’ (latent life) to describe:

“...the state of an organism when it shows no visible signs of life and when its metabolic activity becomes hardly measurable, or comes reversibly to a standstill.”

As microbial research began to gain popularity exponentially, details about ciliated protist physiology and cyst formation led to increased curiosity about the role of encystment in the life cycle of ciliates and other microbes. The realization that no one category of microscopic organism ‘owns’ the ability to form metabolically dormant cysts necessitates the term ‘microbial cyst’ to describe the physical object as it exists in all its forms. Also important in the generation of the term, is the delineation of endospores and microbial cysts as different forms of cryptobiosis or dormancy. Endospores exhibit more extreme isolation from their environment in terms of cell wall thickness, impermeability to substrates, and presence of dipicolinic acid, a compound known to confer resistance to extreme heat. Microbial cysts have been likened to modified vegetative cells with the addition of a specialized capsule. Importantly, encystment is a process observed to precede cell division, while the formation of an endospore involves non-reproductive cellular division. The study of the encystment process was mostly confined to the 1970s and '80s, resulting in the lack of understanding of genetic mechanisms and additional defining characteristics, though they are generally thought to follow a different formation sequence than endospores.

== Formation and composition of the cyst wall ==
Indicators of cyst formation in ciliated protists include varying degrees of ciliature resorption, with some ciliates losing both cilia and the membranous structures supporting them while others maintain kinetosomes and/or microtubular structures. De novo synthesis of cyst wall precursors in the endoplasmic reticulum also frequently indicate a ciliate is undergoing encystment.

The composition of the cyst wall is variable in different organisms.

- The cyst walls of bacteria are formed by the thickening of the normal cell wall with added peptidoglycan layers.
- The walls of protozoan cysts are made of chitin, a type of glycopolymer.
- The cyst wall of some ciliated protists is composed of four layers, ectocyst, mesocyst, endocyst, and the granular layer. The ectocyst is the outer layer and contains a plug-like structure through which the vegetative cell reemerges during excystation. Interior to the ectocyst, the thick mesocyst is compact yet stratified in density. Chitinase treatments indicate the presence of chitin in the mesocyst of some ciliate species, but this compositional characteristic appears to be highly heterogeneous. The thin endocyst, interior to the mesocyst, is less dense than the ectocyst and is believed to be composed of proteins. The innermost granular layer lies directly outside the pellicle and is composed of de novo synthesized precursors of granular material.

== Cyst formation across species ==
=== In bacteria ===
In bacteria (for instance, Azotobacter sp.), encystment occurs by changes in the cell wall; the cytoplasm contracts and the cell wall thickens. Various members of the Azotobacteraceae family have been shown to survive in an encysted form for up to 24 years. The extremophile Rhodospirillum centenum, an anoxygenic, photosynthetic, nitrogen-fixing bacterium that grows in hot springs was found to form cysts in response to desiccation as well. Bacteria do not always form a single cyst. Varieties of cysts formation events are known. Rhodospirillum centenum can change the number of cysts per cell, usually ranging from four to ten cells per cyst depending on the environment.

Some species of filamentous cyanobacteria have been known to form heterocysts to escape levels of oxygen concentration detrimental to their nitrogen fixing processes. This process is distinct from other types of microbial cysts in that the heterocysts are often produced in a repeating pattern within a filament composed of several vegetative cells, and once formed, heterocysts cannot return to a vegetative state.

=== In protists ===
Life cycle of Giardia

Protists, especially protozoan parasites, are often exposed to very harsh conditions at various stages in their life cycle. For example, Entamoeba histolytica, a common intestinal parasite that causes dysentery, has to endure the highly acidic environment of the stomach before it reaches the intestine and various unpredictable conditions like desiccation and lack of nutrients while it is outside the host. An encysted form is well suited to survive such extreme conditions, although protozoan cysts are less resistant to adverse conditions compared to bacterial cysts. Cytoplasmic dehydration, high autophagic activity, nuclear condensation, and decrease of cell volume are all indicators of encystment initiation in ciliated protists. In addition to survival, the chemical composition of certain protozoan cyst walls may play a role in their dispersal. The sialyl groups present in the cyst wall of Entamoeba histolytica confer a net negative charge to the cyst which prevents its attachment to the intestinal wall thus causing its elimination in the feces. Other protozoan intestinal parasites like Giardia lamblia and Cryptosporidium also produce cysts as part of their life cycle (see oocyst). Due to the hard outer shell of the cyst, Cryptosporidium and Giardia are resistant to common disinfectants used by water treatment facilities such as chlorine. In some protozoans, the unicellular organism multiplies during or after encystment and releases multiple trophozoites upon excystation.

Many additional species of protists have been shown to exhibit encystment when confronted with unfavorable environmental conditions.

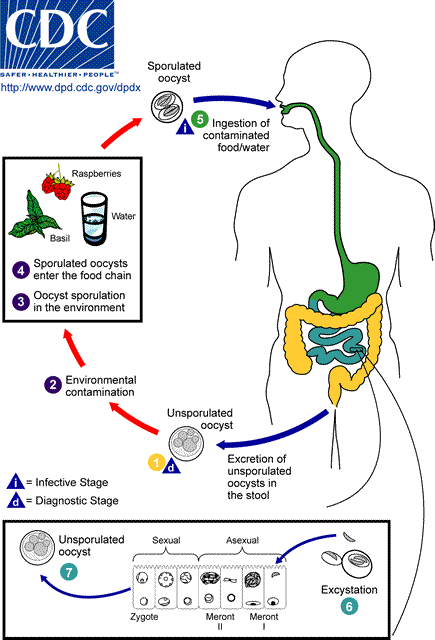
Cryptosporidium life cycle

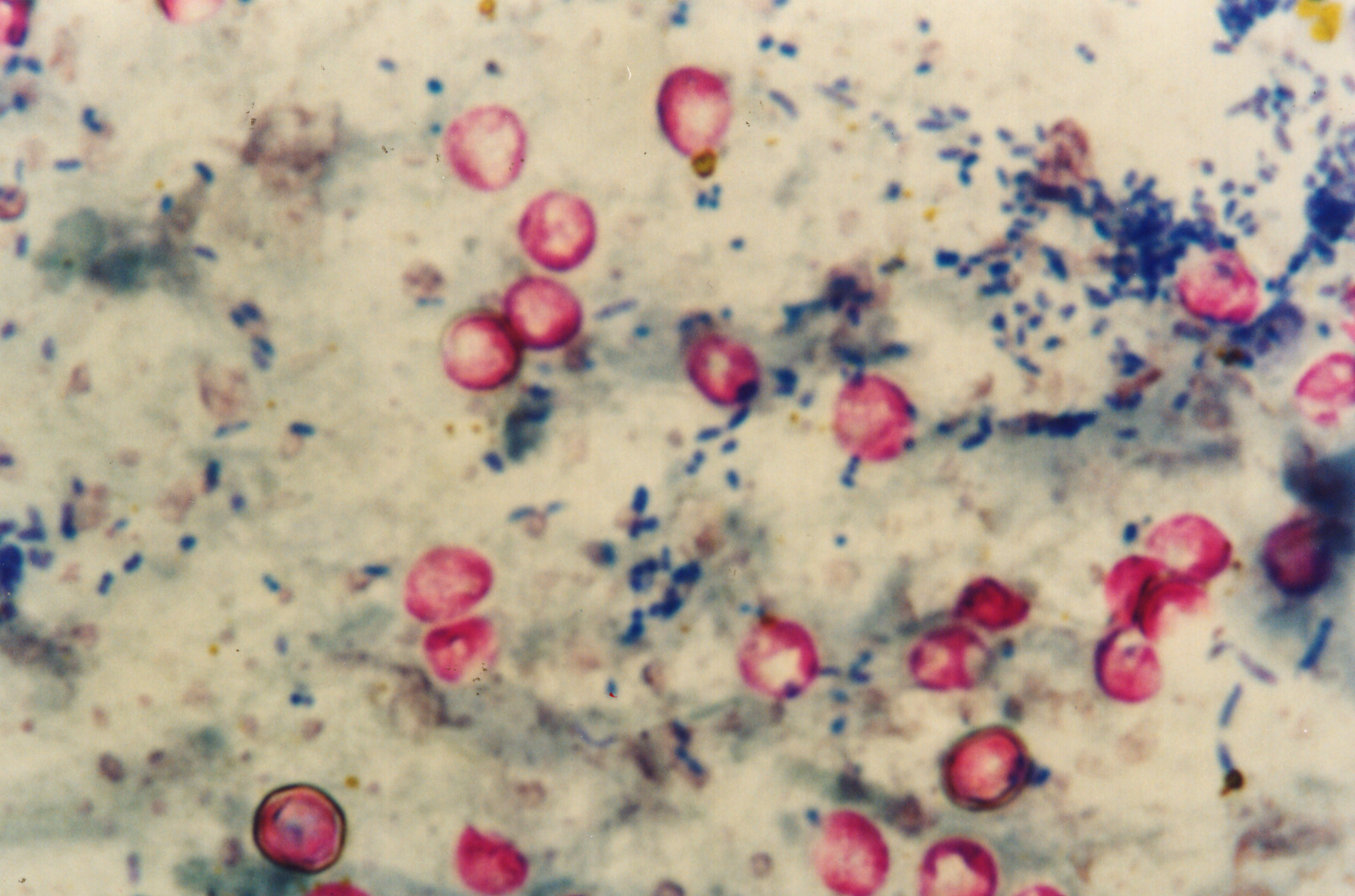
Cryptosporidium under a microscope

=== In rotifers ===
Rotifers also produce diapause cysts, which are different from quiescent (environmentally triggered) cysts in that the process of their formation begins before environmental conditions have deteriorated to unfavorable levels and the dormant state may extend past the restoration of ideal conditions for microbial life. Food limited females of some Synchaeta pectinata strains produce unfertilized diapausing eggs with a thicker shell. Fertilized diapausing eggs can be produced in both food limited and non-food limited conditions, indicative of a bet-hedging mechanism for food availability or perhaps an adaptation to variation in food levels throughout a growing season.

== Pathology ==
While the cyst component itself is not pathogenic, the formation of a cyst is what gives Giardia its primary tool of survival and its ability to spread from host to host. Ingestion of contaminated water, foods, or fecal matter gives rise to the most commonly diagnosed intestinal disease, giardiasis.

Whereas it was previously believed that encystment only served a purpose for the organism itself, it has been found that protozoan cysts have a harboring effect. Common pathogenic bacteria can also be found taking refuge in the cyst of free-living protozoa. Survival times for bacteria in these cysts range from a few days to a few months in harsh environments. Not all bacteria are guaranteed to survive in the cyst formation of a protozoan; many species of bacteria are digested by the protozoan as it undergoes cystic growth.

== See also ==
- Cryptobiosis
- Spore (in bacteria, fungi and algae)
  - Endospore (in firmicute bacteria)
  - Resting spore (in fungi)
- Trophozoite
