= Retortamonas =

- Retortamonas (Retortamonadida), on left; Hexamita, on center, and Giardia, on right (both Diplomonadida)

Scientific classification
- Domain: Eukaryota
- Clade: Metamonada
- Phylum: Fornicata
- Order: Retortamonadida
- Family: Retortamonadidae
- Genus: Retortamonas; Grassi, 1879

Species
- Insect clade; R. agilis (Mackinon 1911); R. alexeiffi (Mackinon 1912); R. belostomae (Brug 1922); R. blattae (Bishop 1931); R. caudacus Geiman 1932; R. gryllotalpae Grassi 1879; R. hodotermitis Brugerolle 2006; R. phyllophagae (Travis & Becker 1931) Wenrich 1932; R. termitus Kirby 1932; toddi Rao 1968; Vertebrate clade; R. boae Kulda 1954; R. bradypi (Hegner & Schumaker 1928); R. caviae (Hegner & Schumaker 1928); R. chelonii Janakidevi 1962; R. cuniculi (Collier & Boeck 1926) Wenrich 1932; R. dobelli (Bishop 1931); R. intestinalis (Wenyon & O'Connor 1917) Wenrich 1932; R. kirbii Gabel 1954; R. mitrulae Kirby & Honigberg 1950; R. ovis (Hegner & Schumaker 1928); R. ruminatum Knowtes & Das Gupta 1931; R. saurarum Grassé 1926; R. testudae Ansari 1955; R. viperae Krishnamurthy & Madre 1976; Uncertain; R. aurangabadensis Sultana 1976; R. grassi; R. indica Krishnamurthy & Sultana 1977; R. masoodi Mali 1993; R. nagabhushani Sultana 1976; R. orthopterorum (Parisi 1910) Wenyon 1926; R. pericopti Laird 1956; R. rotunda Bishop 1932; R. sinensis (Faust & Wassell 1921); R. wenrichi Stabler 1944; R. wenyoni (da Fonseca 1917)

Synonyms
- Embadomonas Mackinon 1911; Plagiomonas Grassé 1881 non Butcher 1967; Waskia Wenyon & O'Connor 1917

Unicellular organism

Retortamonas is a genus of flagellated excavates. It is one of only two genera belonging to the family Retortamonadidae along with the genus Chilomastix. The genus parasitizes a large range of hosts including humans. Species within this genus are considered harmless commensals which reside in the intestine of their host. The wide host diversity is a useful factor given that species are distinguished based on their host rather than morphology. This is because all species share similar morphology, which would present challenges when trying to make classifications based on structural anatomy. Although Retortamonas currently includes over 25 known species, it is possible that some defined species are synonymous, given that such overlapping species have been discovered in the past. Further efforts into learning about this genus must be done such as cross-transmission testing as well as biochemical and genetic studies. One of the most well-known species within this genus is Retortamonas intestinalis, a human parasite that lives in the large intestine of humans.

== Etymology ==
Retort- is derived from the Latin re-torqueo – “to twist back” while the Greek term monas- “one unit, single” refers to its singularity. During locomotion the anterior region of the body twists in a clock-wise direction about its axis, propelling the cell to swim forward, and therefore, the body structure often appears twisted.

== History of knowledge ==
=== First discovery of the genus ===
The human parasite Retortamonas intestinalis was first discovered in 1917 Egypt by Wenyon and O’Connor. This case was reported by a soldier who was diagnosed to be infected with Waskia intestinalis, a species which was later renamed Embadomonas intestinalis by Chalmers and Pekkola in 1918. Afterwards, both Waskia and Embadomonas species were both revised to Retortamonas by Wenrich in 1932.

=== Modern research ===
In more recent findings, a study on the presence of parasites in the intestinal contents of ostriches conducted by a team in Spain 2001 discovered that this genus infected these birds. This was the first time in history that Retortamonas was found to be a parasite of the taxon Aves. There is a chance that the Retortamonas species discovered by this team is one that has already been identified in other hosts, and that other species of birds are also infected.

In previous studies, it was determined that Retortamonas species infect a wide range of hosts including mammals, amphibians, reptiles and insects. Since species are classified on host-type, rather than morphology, this gave rise to many species within this genus. This knowledge of the genus parasitizing a wide range of hosts was used by a team in Asia in 2018 as a tool to assess the phylogeny of Retortamonas species and determine if overlap of synonymous species exists. Through comparison of Retortamonas haplotypes of ribosomal RNA subunits and network analysis between mammal-, amphibian-, and insect-infecting species, a discovery about the species was made by the research team. Results showed that while haplotypes from vertebrate-infecting species formed a three-cluster formation, the insect species were separated, in an isolated cluster with Chilomastix. This indicated insect-infecting species are in fact closer-related to Chilomastix than they are to other Retortamonas. In addition, it was found that Retortamonas infecting humans (R. intestinalis) and other mammals are most likely the same species, and transfer between mammalian hosts likely occurs through zoonotic transmission. Strong evidence showcased this through all mammalian-infecting species grouping together in one monophyphyletic cluster. This discovery is a major piece of evidence towards promoting the reassessment of the current Retortamonas phylogeny. In addition, it addresses the issue that synonymous species are most likely present. It is possible that the three clusters recognized by the team is a telling piece of evidence that only three species of Retortamonas exists.

== Habitat and ecology ==
=== Geographical distribution ===
Retortamonas has a worldwide geographical distribution though presence of infection are commonly found in warmer environments, particularly in Retortamonas intestinalis, suggesting that this is the favourable climate for the genus. The rate of infection of Retortamonas was found to be higher during the summer months in one study conducted in Spain, supporting this idea. In another parasitological study spanning across multiple areas, Retortamonas did not show any significant variation in prevalence when tested in rural and urban areas, thus indicating it has no preference between the two environments. However, the study did show overcrowded areas and regions of poorer sanitation act as environmental factors that play a key role in the prevalence of the parasite A lack of sanitation practices often results in a higher probability of exposure to contaminated feces or other objects likely to carry infection, and paired with high-density populations, this can allow for more rapid transmission between individuals.

=== Microenvironment ===
Retortamonas is adapted to low-oxygen environments, and thus live in such habitats like the intestinal tract of organisms where oxygen levels are extremely low. Retortamonas trophozoites live within the intestinal tract of its host while cysts are more resilient and can survive in the external environment in habitats such as water, awaiting to be ingested by the next host.

=== Parasitic hosts ===
Retortamonas trophozoites have been found to feed on the intestinal bacteria of a wide variety of vertebrates including mammalian, avian, and amphibian hosts, as well as invertebrates, such as insects. Recent evidence however, suggests that species infecting insects are in fact Chilomastix.

== Life cycle ==
Retortamonas has a direct life cycle as it infects a single host without requiring an intermediate or vector to complete its life cycle. Cysts live in the external environment and possess a thickened cyst wall which functions to protect the cell in the harsher habitats during its time away from a host. Cysts are ingested via the fecal-oral route, commonly from contaminated food, water or other materials likely to carry infection. Once in the intestine of its host, cysts undergo excystation into the trophozoite stage that feeds on intestinal bacteria. Each cyst gives rise to only one trophozoite. Retortamonas trophozoites then multiply asexually through lateral binary fission. Eventually the trophozoites encyst, and the cysts are discharged via feces. The cysts are usually found living in food and water while they wait to be taken up by the next host and continue the spread of transmission via the fecal-oral route.

== Feeding mechanisms ==
Retortamonas feed on intestinal bacteria in the gut of the host. The trophozoites feed by endocytosis with the help of the posterior, vaned flagellum. Movement in a waving-like motion by the flagellum brings food particles inwards, towards the cell. Retortamonas is then able to engulf them into the cell and form an internal food vacuole. The cyst stage's main function is to survive in the external environment away from the host and spread transmission rather than feeding, coinciding with the fact it has no availability to a food source as it is located away from the intestine of its host.

== Pathogenesis ==
Retortamonas is non-pathogenic. Since this genus has not been discovered to cause any disease, it has been classified as a harmless commensal.

=== Diagnosis ===
Infection is commonly detectable by the presence of cysts or trophozoites in fecal samples. The probability of finding either or both the cyst and trophozoite stage in feces is very low, and often up to thousands of samples are required before detection is achieved. Since this genus does not cause any disease-like symptoms, diagnosis usually only occurs when it is being specifically looked for, such as in studies targeting presence of Retortamonas in patients. In other cases, it is found in patients who are infected with additional pathogenic parasites and being treated for those symptoms. This is common because transmission via the fecal-oral route is the mode used by many parasites, and so individuals are often infected with multiple species at a time.

=== Treatment ===
There is no known treatment for infection of this parasite, most likely due to the fact that it is non-pathogenic and requires no intensive medical attention.

== Morphology and anatomy ==
=== Trophozoites ===
The trophozoite shape varies among Retortamonas species. Pyriform, fusiform, and rounded structures have all been found. Many are described to have a blunt anterior region and a pointed posterior, ending in a needle-like tail. A notable difference in cell length among species has also been recognized. All species have an enlarged feeding groove acting as the mouth of the organism and a small nucleus located in the anterior region of the cell body. The feeding groove, located near the nucleus, is divided into two sections; an anterior and a posterior pocket positioned in the upper region and deeper within the cell respectively. Retortamonas species lack of an axostyle, kinetoplast, and parabasal body. In addition, species of this genus also lack mitochondria, Golgi apparatus, and an undulating membrane, a shared characteristic with the other genus of the family Retortamonadidae. All species of Retortamonas possess two flagella; one free, anteriorly-directed flagellum, and one posteriorly-directed, vaned, trailing flagellum located in the feeding groove. While in some species the posterior flagellum is confined within the feeding groove, in others it extends far out beyond this oral pouch. The functionality of both the anterior and posterior flagella is consistent across all Retortamonas species. The anterior flagellum aids in locomotion by moving in a whip-like motion, allowing the cell body to propel forward. The trailing, recurrent flagellum extends out from the feeding groove and is most likely involved only in feeding mechanisms such as ingestion. A single, spherical nucleus is present in the anterior region of the cell body.

=== Cysts ===
Retortamonas cysts are pear-shaped, and smaller than the trophozoite. In addition, the cysts are also rounder than trophozoites, having been described as oval-shaped with a rounded posterior while the anterior end tapers only slightly, forming a cap of the cell with a thickened cyst wall. The cysts also contain a distinct anterior nucleus, but the flagella thicken and shorten during encystation, becoming indistinguishable within the cytoplasm.
