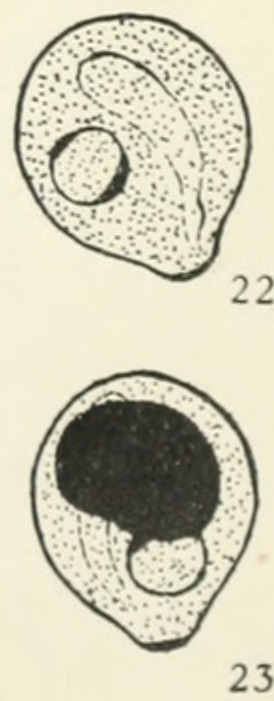
- Cysts of Chilomastix mesnili Fig. 22: The cytostome and nucleus clearly visible. Size 8.5 μm × 7.5 μm Fig. 23: The cytostome and nucleus partially obscured by large deeply staining mass of glycogen. Size 8.5 μm×7.5 μm

Scientific classification
- Domain: Eukaryota
- Clade: Metamonada
- Phylum: Fornicata
- Order: Retortamonadida
- Family: Retortamonadidae
- Genus: Chilomastix
- Species: C. mesnili

Binomial name
- Chilomastix mesnili (Wenyon, 1910)

= Chilomastix mesnili =

Species of eukaryote

Chilomastix mesnili is a non-pathogenic member of primate gastrointestinal microflora, commonly associated with but not causing parasitic infections. It is found in about 3.5% of the population in the United States. In addition to humans, Chilomastix is found in chimpanzees, orangutans, monkeys, and pigs. It lives in the cecum and colon. C. mesnili has a similar life style to Giardia lamblia.

Although Chilomastix mesnili is considered non-pathogenic, it often occurs with other parasite infections. C. mesnili may be confused with other pathogenic species during diagnosis. It can create a false positive which would result in unnecessary treatment or a false negative which would withhold necessary treatment. It contain mainly two life forms trophozoite and cyst. Trophozoites are pear shaped and it contains a round oval nucleus which is situated anteriorly and by its side lies the conspicuous mouth (cystosome). The posterior extremity is drawn out to a fine point. There are the large long anterior free flagella and the fourth one is short and lies within the cystosome. There are no undulating membrane and axostyle. The cyst are lemons shaped with a small projection at the anterior end. The single nucleus lies near the centre. Remnants of buccal appartus is also visible.

== Sources ==
- Schmidt, G. and Roberts, L. 2005. Foundations of Parasitology (7th ed.), New York: McGraw-Hill
