= Giardia microti =

Scientific classification
- Domain: Eukaryota
- Phylum: Metamonada
- Order: Diplomonadida
- Family: Hexamitidae
- Genus: Giardia
- Species: G. microti

Binomial name
- Giardia microti Kofoid & Christiansen, 1915

Species of parasitic protozoan of rodents

Giardia microti is a species of Diplomonad parasitic protozoan. Its hosts mainly consist of rodents in the family Cricetidae, which includes voles, mice, rats and muskrats, although they have also been detected from fish.

== Recorded hosts ==
Giardia microti has been recorded as a parasite of the following animals:

- Lates calcarifer (Giant seaperch)
- Microtus arvalus (Common vole)
- Microtus guentheri (Günther's vole)
- Microtus ochrogaster (Prairie vole)
- Myodes glareolus (Bank vole)
- Ondatra zibethicus (Muskrat)

The species is the dominant parasite in the genera Microtus and Myodes.

== Phylogeny ==
Giardia microti is believed to be the sister taxon of the Giardia intestinalis group.
