= Spironucleus salmonicida =

Scientific classification
- Domain: Eukaryota
- (unranked): incertae sedis
- Clade: Metamonada
- Phylum: Fornicata
- Order: Diplomonadida
- Family: Hexamitidae
- Genus: Spironucleus
- Species: S. salmonicida

Binomial name
- Spironucleus salmonicida (Jørgensen, 2006)

Species of fish parasite

Spironucleus salmonicida is a species of fish parasite. It is a flagellate adapted to micro-aerobic environments that causes systemic infections in salmonid fish. The species creates foul-smelling, pus-filled abscesses in muscles and internal organs of aquarium fish. In the late 1980s when the disease was first reported, it was believed to be caused by Spironucleus barkhanus. Anders Jørgensen was the person that found out what species really caused the disease.

There is a distinct lack of models for diverse microbial eukaryotes. Spironucleus salmonicida was chosen as a model due to its complex genome and ability to adapt to fluctuating environments. This ability was proven by genetically modifying the pathogen and seeing the results. By comparing these results with the closest model organism, Giardia intestinalis, researchers were able to see that the parasite has a more complex gene regulation system. This system of genetic modification was also used to sequence the genome for further study.

Spironucleus salmonicida contains mitochondrion-related organelles (MROs). MROS identified in S. salmonicida contained similar protein import and Fe-S machinery as in Giardia mitosomes and the MROS contained enzyme characteristics similar to hydrogenosomes, thereby affirming that hydrogen production is prevalent in the genus Spironucleus. Hydrogenosomes produce ATP by substrate-level phosphorylation with hydrogen as a byproduct.
