= Ciliate, dasycladacean and hexamita nuclear code =

Alternative genetic code

The ciliate, dasycladacean and Hexamita nuclear code (translation table 6) is a genetic code used by certain ciliate, dasycladacean and Hexamita species.

The ciliate macronuclear code has not been determined completely. The codon UAA is known to code for Gln only in the Oxytrichidae.

== The code ==
AAs = FFLLSSSSYYQQCC*WLLLLPPPPHHQQRRRRIIIMTTTTNNKKSSRRVVVVAAAADDEEGGGG
Starts = -----------------------------------M----------------------------
Base1 = TTTTTTTTTTTTTTTTCCCCCCCCCCCCCCCCAAAAAAAAAAAAAAAAGGGGGGGGGGGGGGGG
Base2 = TTTTCCCCAAAAGGGGTTTTCCCCAAAAGGGGTTTTCCCCAAAAGGGGTTTTCCCCAAAAGGGG
Base3 = TCAGTCAGTCAGTCAGTCAGTCAGTCAGTCAGTCAGTCAGTCAGTCAGTCAGTCAGTCAGTCAG

Bases: adenine (A), cytosine (C), guanine (G) and thymine (T) or uracil (U).

Amino acids: Alanine (Ala, A), Arginine (Arg, R), Asparagine (Asn, N), Aspartic acid (Asp, D), Cysteine (Cys, C), Glutamic acid (Glu, E), Glutamine (Gln, Q), Glycine (Gly, G), Histidine (His, H), Isoleucine (Ile, I), Leucine (Leu, L), Lysine (Lys, K), Methionine (Met, M), Phenylalanine (Phe, F), Proline (Pro, P), Serine (Ser, S), Threonine (Thr, T), Tryptophan (Trp, W), Tyrosine (Tyr, Y), Valine (Val, V).

== Differences from the standard code ==
DNA codons	RNA codons	This code (6)	Standard code (1)
TAA	UAA	Gln (Q)	STOP = Ter (*)
TAG	UAG	Gln (Q)	STOP = Ter (*)

== Systematic range ==
- Ciliata: Oxytricha and Stylonychia, Paramecium, Tetrahymena, Oxytrichidae and probably Glaucoma chattoni.
- Dasycladaceae: Acetabularia, and Batophora.
- Diplomonadida: Hexamita inflata, Diplomonadida ATCC50330, and ATCC50380.

== See also ==
- List of genetic codes
