= Spironucleus =

Scientific classification
- Domain: Eukaryota
- Clade: Metamonada
- Phylum: Fornicata
- Order: Diplomonadida
- Family: Hexamitidae
- Subfamily: Hexamitinae
- Genus: Spironucleus

Species
- Spironucleus barkhanus; Spironucleus columbae; Spironucleus meleagridis; Spironucleus muris; Spironucleus salmonicida; Spironucleus salmonis; Spironucleus torosa; Spironucleus vortens

Genus of animal parasites

Spironucleus is a diplomonad genus that is bilaterally symmetrical and can be found in various animal hosts. This genus is a binucleate flagellate, which is able to live in the anaerobic conditions of animal intestinal tracts. A characteristic of Spironucleus that is common to all metamonads is that it does not have aerobic mitochondria, but instead rely on hydrogenosomes to produce energy. Spironucleus has six anterior and two posterior flagella. The life cycle of Spironucleus involves one active trophozoite stage and one inactive cyst stage. Spironucleus undergoes asexual reproduction via longitudinal binary fission. Spironucleus vortens can cause lateral line erosion in freshwater anglefish. Spironucleus columbae is found to cause hexamitiasis in pigeons. Finally, Spironucleus muris is found to cause illnesses of the digestive system in mice, rats, and hamsters. The genome of Spironucleus has been studied to exhibit the role of lateral gene transfer from prokaryotes in allowing for anaerobic metabolic processes in diplomonads.

== Ecology ==
The different species of Spironucleus can be found in a variety of animal hosts, including fish, birds, and mice.

One parasite in fish was previously known as Spironucleus barkhanus, but was then redescribed as Spironucleus salmonicida. This new classification was given to this organism so that Spironucleus salmonicida could be discernible from the fish commensals Spironucleus barkhanus as they were morphologically identical, but genetically different . Spironucleus vortens species is often found in freshwater angelfish, where it affects the gastrointestinal tract and may cause head and lateral line erosion. Pathogenesis of Spironucleus can be promoted by stressful environmental conditions, including poor water quality, malnutrition, overcrowding, and fluctuating temperatures. These pathogens can be found in wild fish, as well as farmed fish. However, farmed fish are more susceptible to the Spironucleus pathogen due to the poor conditions that sometimes accompany aquaculture.

A species found in birds is Spironucleus columbae. A study in the Handbook of Avian Medicine states that this species of Spironucleus causes hexamitiasis in pigeons. Young pigeons can become infected with Spironucleus columbae by consuming droppings, food, or water that contain the protozoan. The colonization and division of this species in the intestinal tract can cause small ulcerative lesions and other accompanying physical digestive illnesses. Some accompanying illnesses due to the lesions may include vomiting, dehydration, diarrhoea, and weight loss. These symptoms may also be worsened by bacterial infections within the lesions. In serious conditions, Spironucleus columbae may ultimately cause death.

A species found in mice is Spironucleus muris. It can be found in normal adult mice, where it would not cause severe symptoms. This species is more pathogenic in young, stressed, or immunocompromised mice. In addition to mice, Spironucleus muris can also cause digestive illnesses to rats and hamsters as well. One illness that this species can cause on mice, rats, and hamsters includes the inflammation of the small bowel. Greaves (2012) states that this species can be seen in crypts and intervillous spaces of the gut and lists "blunting of intestinal villi, epithelial degeneration and mucin depletion, reactive epithelial hyperplasia, edema, and leukocyte infiltration" as associated symptoms. Additionally, Whary et al. (2015) lists some physical symptoms of an infected mouse include poor hair coat, sluggish behaviour, and weight loss. Like other Spironucleus species, transmission occurs through the faecal or oral route to infect the intestinal tract and potentially cause lethal illnesses.

== Genetics ==
The genome of Spironucleus has been studied to demonstrate the exchange of genetic material between lineages of various protists. A study by Andersson et al. (2007) discovered 84 genes in S. salmonicida that were involved in lateral gene transfer based on their unexpected positions in the phylogenetic tree. The sequences found were similar to other eukaryotes related to diplomonads, as well as prokaryotes. Many of the genes found from lateral gene transfer from prokaryotes were responsible for the anaerobic metabolic processes that allowed diplomonads to become anaerobes. A comparative study of the genomes of S. salmonicida with its close relative, Giardia lamblia, lends insight into the role that lateral gene transfer has on the large diversity of protist genomes. Additionally, another study by Xu et al. (2014) compared the genomes of S. salmonicida and Giardia intestinalis to find that S. salmonicida possesses more extensive metabolic stores and more elaborate gene regulation that allows for the parasite to better manage unstable environmental conditions. The comparison between the genomes of both protists contribute in the understanding of the biology of parasitic protists and the evolution of eukaryotic genomes.
