= Retortamonas intestinalis =

Scientific classification
- Domain: Eukaryota
- Clade: Metamonada
- Phylum: Fornicata
- Order: Retortamonadida
- Family: Retortamonadidae
- Genus: Retortamonas
- Species: R. intestinalis

Binomial name
- Retortamonas intestinalis (Wenyon & O'Connor, 1917)

Species of flagellate

Retortamonas intestinalis is a species of retortamonads which is found in the gastrointestinal tract.

== Ecology ==
=== Habitat ===
Retortamonas intestinalis resides in unhygienic areas and are fond of extremely warm climates, inferring that they do not survive in the cold.

== Infection ==
=== How it spreads ===
Retortamonas intestinalis usually spreads through human hosts (as nonhuman hosts containing this organism have not been reported) in the form of cysts via the stool of the individual. However, the probability of infection through this is very low, as the common factors pertaining to infection is the exposure of unsanitary contamination and overcrowding of the populus.
