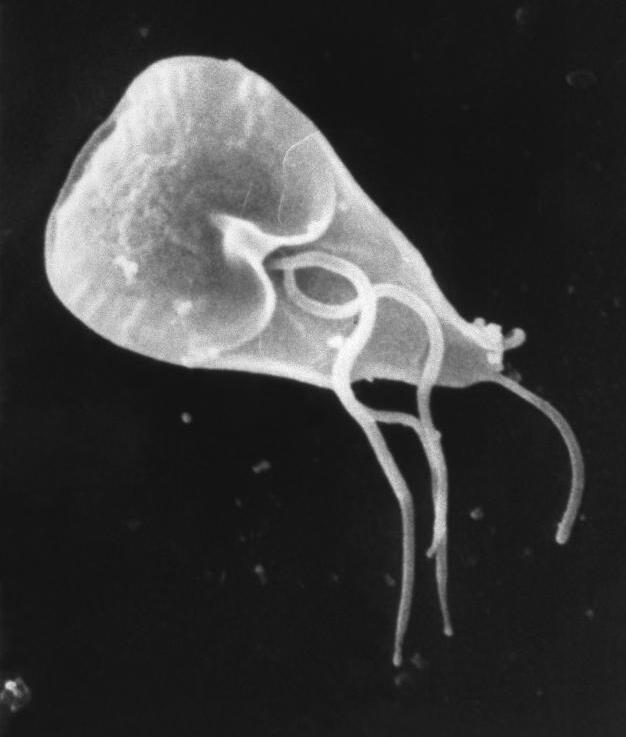
- Giardia trophozoite, SEM

Scientific classification
- Domain: Eukaryota
- Clade: Metamonada
- Phylum: Fornicata
- Order: Diplomonadida
- Family: Hexamitidae
- Subfamily: Giardiinae; Kulda & Nohynkova, 1978

Genera
- Brugerolleia; Giardia; Octomitus

= Giardiinae =

Subfamily of flagellates

Giardiinae is a subfamily of diplomonads.
