= BZI =

BZI, Bzí or bzi may refer to:

- BZI, the IATA code for Balıkesir Airport, Turkey
- Bzí, a village and part of Dolní Bukovsko in the Czech Republic
- Bzí, a village and part of Letiny in the Czech Republic
- Bzí, a village and part of Železný Brod in the Czech Republic
- bzi, the ISO 639-3 code for Bisu language, Thailand and China
