= Octomitus =

Scientific classification
- Domain: Eukaryota
- Clade: Metamonada
- Phylum: Fornicata
- Class: Eopharyngea
- Order: Diplomonadida
- Family: Octomitidae
- Genus: Octomitus; Prowazek, 1904

Genus of flagellates

Octomitus is a genus of Excavata.

It includes the species Octomitus intestinalis.
