= Hexamita inflata =

Scientific classification
- Domain: Eukaryota
- Clade: Metamonada
- Phylum: Fornicata
- Order: Diplomonadida
- Family: Hexamitidae
- Genus: Hexamita
- Species: H. inflata

Binomial name
- Hexamita inflata Dujardin, 1841

Species of parasitic diplomonad

Hexamita inflata is a species of free-living diplomonad that was isolated for the first time from shallow water in a wetland in Řevnice, Czech Republic. This species is found in marine environments where the concentration of oxygen is low, such as sediments of ponds or the water column of marine basins.

== Morphology ==
The trophozoites are characterised for presenting two pairs of three anterior flagella and one recurrent flagellum that exists the cytosome.
