= List of mammals of Nova Scotia =

This is a list of Nova Scotian mammals.

== Rodents (Rodentia) ==
=== Squirrels and marmots (Sciuridae) ===
- Eastern chipmunk (Tamias striatus)
- American red squirrel (Tamiasciurus hudsonicus)
- Southern flying squirrel (Glaucomys volans)
- Northern flying squirrel (Glaucomys sabrinus)
- Groundhog (Marmota monax)

=== Beavers (Castoridae) ===
- North American beaver (Castor canadensis)

=== Voles, rats and mice (Muridae) ===
- Red-backed vole (Clethrionomys gapperi)
- Southern bog lemming (Synaptomis cooperi)
- Muskrat (Ondatra zibethicus)
- Meadow vole (Microtus pennsylvanicus)
- Rock vole (Microtus chrotorrhinus)
- House mouse (Mus musculus) introduced
- Brown rat (Rattus norvegicus) introduced
- Black rat (Rattus rattus) introduced
- Deer mouse (Peromyscus maniculatus)
- White-footed mouse (Peromyscus leucopus)
- Woodland jumping mouse (Napaeozapus insignis)
- Meadow jumping mouse (Zapus hudsonius)

=== New World porcupines (Erethizontidae) ===
- North American porcupine (Erethizon dorsatum)

== Lagomorphs (Lagomorpha) ==
- Snowshoe hare (Lepus americanus)

== Insectivores (Insectivora) ==
=== Shrews (Soricidae) ===
- Arctic shrew (Sorex arcticus)
- Common shrew (Sorex cinereus)
- Smoky shrew (Sorex fumeus)
- Gaspé shrew (Sorex gaspensis)
- Long-tailed shrew (Sorex dispar)
- Water shrew (Sorex palustris)
- Pygmy shrew (Sorex hoyi)
- Short-tailed shrew (Blarina brevicauda)

=== Moles (Talpidae) ===
- Star-nosed mole (Condylura cristata)

== Bats (Chiroptera) ==
- Little brown bat (Myotis lucifugus)
- Hoary bat (Lasiurus cinereus)
- Red bat (Lasiurus borealis)
- Northern long-eared bat (Myotis septentrionalis)
- Big brown bat (Eptesicus fuscus)
- Tricolored bat (Perimyotis subflavus)
- Silver-haired bat (Lasionycteris noctivagans)

== Carnivores (Carnivora) ==
=== Canines (Canidae) ===
- Coyote (Canis latrans ssp.)
- Grey wolf (Canis lupus) extirpated
- Red fox (Vulpes vulpes)

=== Bears (Ursidae) ===
- Black bear (Ursus americanus)

=== Raccoons (Procyonidae) ===
- Raccoon (Procyon lotor)

=== Mustelids (Mustelidae) ===
- River otter (Lontra canadensis)
- American marten (Martes americana)
- American mink (Neogale vison)
- American ermine (Mustela richardsonii)
- Fisher (Pekania pennanti)
- Sea mink (Mustela macrodon) extinct

=== Skunks (Mephitidae) ===
- Striped skunk (Mephitis mephitis)

=== Felines (Felidae) ===
- Eastern cougar (Puma concolor couguar) extirpated, but sightings continue.
- Canada lynx (Lynx canadensis)
- Bobcat (Lynx rufus) introduced

=== Earless seals (Phocidae) ===
- Harbor seal (Phoca vitulina)
- Harp seal (Pagophilus groenlandicus)
- Hooded seal (Cystophora cristata)
- Grey seal (Halichoerus grypus)
- Ringed seal (Pusa hispida)

=== Walruses (Otariidae) ===
- Walrus (Odobenus rosmarus) extirpated

== Even-toed ungulates (Artiodactyla) ==
=== Deer (Cervidae) ===
- White-tailed deer (Odocoileus virginianus) native but left and returned on their own
- Moose (Alces alces)
- Caribou (Rangifer tarandus) extirpated

== Whales (Cetacea) ==
=== Oceanic dolphins (Delphinidae) ===
- Short-beaked common dolphin (Delphinus delphis)
- Short-finned pilot whale (Globicephala macrorhynchus)
- Risso's dolphin (Grampus griseus)
- Orca (Orcinus orca)
- Striped dolphin (Stenella coeruleoalba)

=== Rorqual whales (Balaenopteridae) ===
- Humpback whale (Megaptera novaeangliae)
- Minke whale (Balaenoptera acutorostrata)
- Fin whale (Balaenoptera physalus)
- Blue whale (Balaenoptera musculus)
