= Barbulanympha =

Scientific classification
- Domain: Eukaryota
- Clade: Metamonada
- Phylum: Parabasalia
- Class: Trichonymphea
- Order: Trichonymphida
- Family: Barbulanymphidae
- Genus: Barbulanympha; L.R.Cleveland, S.R.Hall, E.P.Sanders & J.Collier, 1934

Genus of protists

Barbulanympha is a genus of hypermastigote protozoa found in the hindguts of wood-eating cockroaches, and specifically Cryptocercus punctulatus. These protists are characterized by a symbiotic relationship with bacteria, particularly Bacteroidales ectosymbionts. Research combines genomics and isotope imaging to understand their function and evolution. Studies suggest that Barbulanympha ectosymbionts are capable of nitrogen fixation, supported by genomic and in vivo functional investigations. The ectosymbiont genome contains operons for nitrogen fixation, a urea transporter, and urease, indicating nitrogen availability drives the symbiosis.

== Type species ==
The type species for the genus Barbulanympha is Barbulanympha laurabuda.

== History of knowledge ==
Barbulanympha was first described in 1934, with this initial work establishing the genus and suggesting the existence of at least four species, differing primarily in body size, organelle size and number, and chromosome number. Cleveland et al. also classified Barbulanympha within the family Hoplonymphidae, noting its similarities to Hoplonympha and related genera like Rhynchonympha and Urinympha. Subsequent research has focused on the morphology and ultrastructure of Barbulanympha. Studies using light microscopy (LM) and electron microscopy have provided detailed surface morphological surveys of Barbulanympha, particularly regarding its symbiotic relationships with bacteria. Detailed studies of mitosis in Barbulanympha have been facilitated by successful in vitro culture techniques. These studies have described prophase events, spindle fiber structure, and chromosomal spindle fiber formation. Recent genomic and functional investigations have explored the symbiotic functions of Barbulanympha ectosymbionts, particularly their role in nitrogen fixation

== Habitat and ecology ==
Barbulanympha is found in the hindguts of wood-eating cockroaches, specifically Cryptocercus punctulatus. These endosymbiotic hosts are typically found in North America, specifically within the eastern United States in the Appalachian mountains, which represents the geographic range of Barbulanympha as well. This anaerobic niche is shared with a diversity of other protozoa, prokaryotes, and ingested cellulose particles. As Barbulanympha interacts with a mixed microbial community in the hindgut, they retain cell walls, outer membranes, and outer membrane proteins to mediate interactions with the hindgut environment. They also retain efflux transporters to defend against the mixed microbial community. The microorganisms in the hindgut, including Barbulanympha and prokaryotes, digest cellulose ingested by the host. This makes metabolic products available to the host. Barbulanympha has a spongy glycocalyx on its cell surface which may be important for bacterial adhesion and/or metabolite exchange

== Description ==
Barbulanympha cells range from 69 to 142 mm wide and their body shape resembles an acorn, but their shape can vary. There are size variations among different species of Barbulanympha, with the size of the body, the size and number of organelles, and the number of chromosomes being key characteristics that differentiate species. They have two identical flagellated areas on the anterior portion of the body. These areas are relatively small and half-cone shaped. The flagella arise from rows of basal granules. The flagella in Barbulanympha appear to move more or less independently. The approximate number of flagella varies from 1,500 in the smallest species to 13,000 in the largest. The body is covered with cuticular striations, which form a screen with a more or less definite pattern.

A large nucleus is contained in a membranous nuclear sleeve in the anterior portion of the cell. The interphase chromatin granules are larger than those of other genera. The nucleus is connected with the nuclear membrane by many fibers or strands, which become the intranuclear chromosomal fibers when chromosomes develop. Both chromatin and plastid nucleoli are present. Barbulanympha possesses two centrioles. In the larger species, each centriole is about 30 microns long, while in the smaller species it is a little more than half this length. Their proximal ends are slightly enlarged and connected by a desmose. The distal ends of the centrioles are surrounded by centrosomes. The number of axostyles in Barbulanympha varies from an average of 80 in the smallest species to an average of 350 in the largest species. Each axostyle is composed of several fibers.

There are approximately the same number of parabasals in each species of Barbulanympha as axostyles. The thread of the parabasal then increases in size to form the body, which is sausage shaped. Underneath each flagellated area is a half-cone shaped structure, the parabasal-axostylar lamella. The parabasals and axostyles are attached to this structure.

During cell division, Barbulanympha has a distinct two-stage anaphase. In anaphase-A, the chromosomal spindle fibres shorten, pulling the chromosomes towards the stationary centrosomes located at the poles of the central spindle. Importantly, the central spindle does not elongate during this phase. The nuclear envelope forms a seam anterior to the spindle and transforms the nucleus into a sleeve surrounding the central spindle. Following anaphase-A, anaphase-B commences with the elongation of the central spindle, which can increase up to fivefold. This elongation pushes the "telophasic" bouquets of chromosomes, still connected to the centrosomes by the shortened chromosomal fibres, further apart. During this stage, a cleft opens in the nuclear seam and expands, progressively exposing the central spindle and eventually partitioning the nucleus into two daughter nuclei.

Barbulanympha is characterized by a close association with rod-shaped bacteria of the order Bacteroidales, which form a dense monolayer on its cell surface. These are considered mutualistic symbionts. These ectosymbionts are also found within cytoplasmic vesicles of Barbulanympha. Molecular data indicate that Barbulanympha is consistently associated with a specific lineage of Bacteroidales.

== List of species ==
The genus Barbulanympha includes several species:

- Barbulanympha laurabuda
- Barbulanympha ufalula
- Barbulanympha estaboga
- Barbulanympha coahoma
- Barbulanympha cryptocerci
