= Hospital of the Holy Spirit, Warsaw =

Building in Warsaw, Poland

Hospital of the Holy Spirit in Warsaw (12 Elektoralna Street)
- Szpital Świętego Ducha w Warszawie (ul. Elektoralna 12)
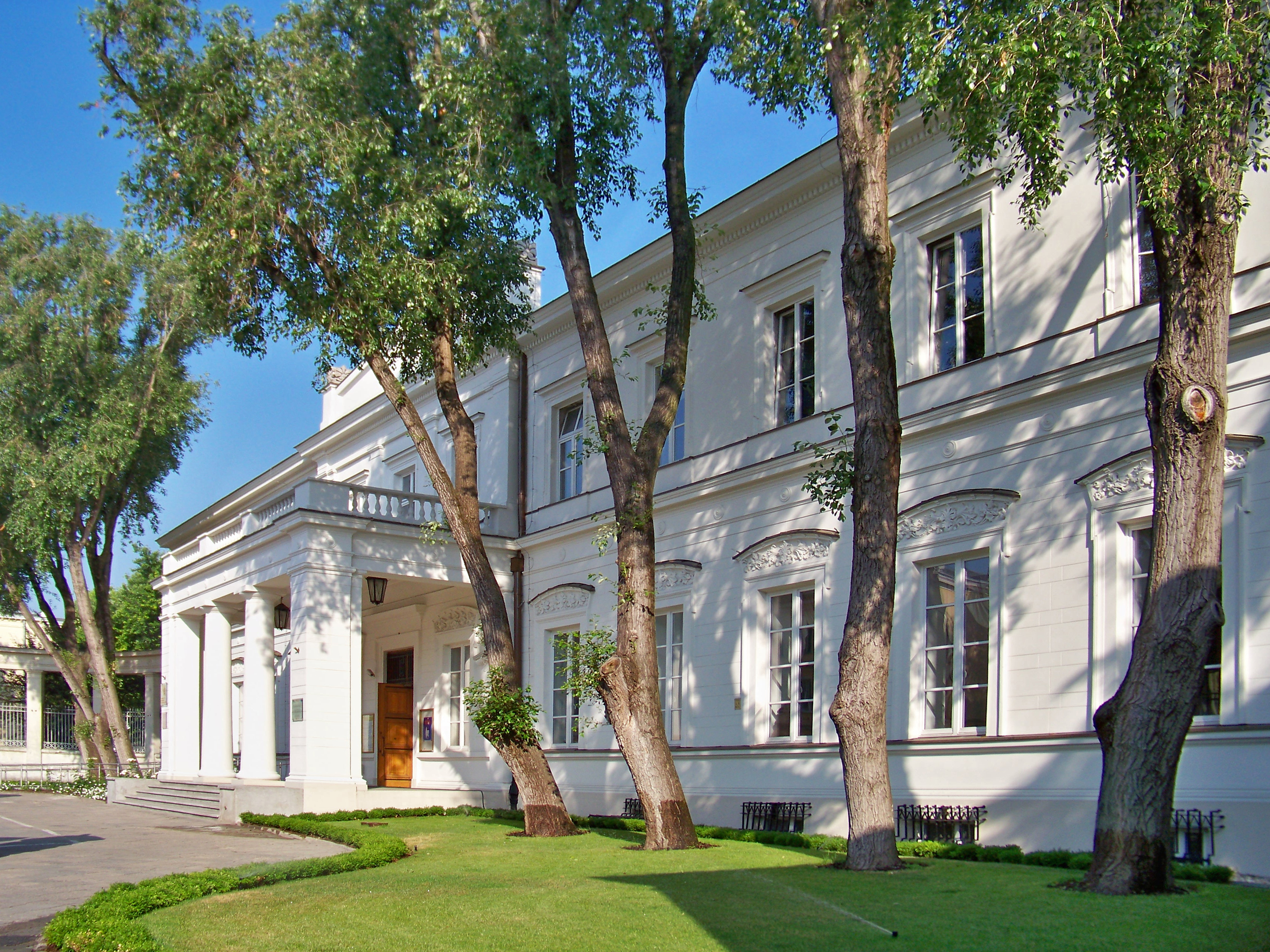
- View of the former hospital from the street
- Interactive map of the Hospital of the Holy Spirit in Warsaw (12 Elektoralna Street) area

General information
- Architectural style: Neo-renaissance
- Location: Warsaw, Poland, 12 Elektoralna Street, 00-139 Warsaw, Poland
- Coordinates: 52°14′26.23″N 20°59′53.48″E
- Current tenants: Mazowieckie Centrum Kultury i Sztuki
- Completed: 1861

Design and construction
- Architect: Józef Orłowski

The Hospital of the Holy Spirit in Warsaw (Szpital Świętego Ducha w Warszawie) was a hospital originally built in 1442, at the church of St. Martin's at Piwna Street in Warsaw's Old Town. It was founded by Anna Fiodorówna (a princess of the Duchy of Masovia) as a shelter for the poor. After a number of moves, it stayed at Elektoralna Street.

== History ==
The building at 12 Elektoralna Street was built between 1859 and 1861 according to a neo-Renaissance design by Józef Orlowski. The site was a former cart and carriage factory. It was the first hospital in Warsaw with free-standing pavilions. From 1861 until World War II, it was one of the most modern hospitals in the city. Bombed on 25 September 1939, it was again damaged later during the Warsaw Uprising.

Before the war, the medical clinic was run by Vilém Dušan Lambl with Samuel Goldflam as his assistant. In 1881, the head of the chemical-bacteriological laboratory was Leon Nencki.

The hospital repeatedly moved: first at Piwna Street, then Przyrynku, Konwiktorska Street, Elektoralna and in 1940 to Wola Hospital. In 1941, the two hospitals were transferred to buildings of the Jewish community. The abandoned buildings were used as a German military hospital. In 1946, the buildings was occupied again by the Hospital of the Holy Spirit. In 1957, the name was changed to City Hospital No. 1.

In 1953, the building at Elektoralna Street was rebuilt for cultural purposes. First, occupied by trade unions, it later housed the Warsaw Cultural Centre (Warszawski Ośrodek Kultury). It now houses:

- The Mazovia Region Centre of Culture and Arts (Mazowieckie Centrum Kultury i Sztuki) - a merger of the National Cultural Centre Concert Agency and the Metropolitan Bureau of Art Exhibitions
- Special School No. 63
  - Primary School No. 213 - transferred to 12/14 Elektoralna Street in September 1969
  - Gimnazjum No. 62
- Special School No. 85 - moved to 12/14 Elektoralna in 1975
  - Special Primary School No. 243
  - Special Secondary School No. 146
  - The three-year job-training school No. 5
