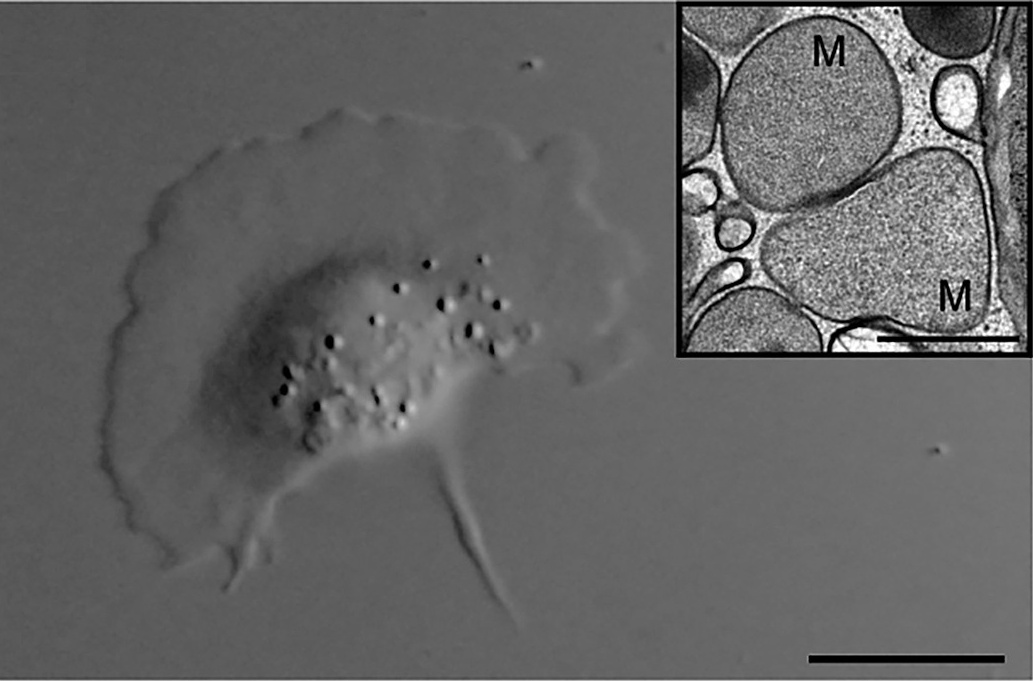
- Differential interference contrast micrograph of A. flamelloides, scale bar: 10 μm. Inlet shows a transmission electron micrograph of the cell, including MROs (M); scale bar: 0.5 μm.

Scientific classification
- Domain: Eukaryota
- Clade: Metamonada
- Phylum: Anaeramoebae; Stairs et al. 2021
- Family: Anaeramoebidae; Táborský, Pánek & Čepička in Táborský et al. 2017
- Genus: Anaeramoeba; Táborský, Pánek & Čepička in Táborský et al. 2017

Type species
- Anaeramoeba flamelloides Táborský, Pánek & Čepička in Táborský et al. 2017

Species
- A. flamelloides; A. gargantua; A. ignava; A. megacephala; A. oblonga; A. parva; A. pumila

= Anaeramoeba =

Genus of amoebae

Anaeramoeba is a genus of free-living anaerobic eukaryotes, first described in 2017.

== Description ==
As the name implies, Anaeramoeba are anaerobic amoeboid organisms which form a fan-like shape similar to that of Flamella. At least two species can also sometimes assume flagellate forms; with either two or four flagella. They contain double-membrane bound organelles called hydrogenosomes, which is a type of mitochondria-related organelles (MROs) and assumed to be derived from mitochondria, to perform metabolism in anaerobic environments. The hydrogenosomes in Anaeramoeba are closely associated with H_{2}-consuming bacterial symbionts, which are enveloped by Anaeramoeba host's membrane called symbiosome.

== Discovery and classification ==
Anaeramoeba specimens were first isolated in 2017, from shallow marine sediments around the world. Despite the similarities to Flamella in both morphology and environment, genetic analyses found that Anaeramoeba do not belong within Amoebozoa. Instead, Anaeramoeba represents a newly identified protist belonging to metamonads, as a close relative to parabasalids.

== Symbiosome in Anaeramoeba ==
Anaeramoeba's symbiosome is a unique highly elaborate membrane-bound structure that houses their bacterial symbionts in close association with their hydrogenosomes that allow efficient metabolic syntrophy between the hosts and the symbionts. In A. flamelloides BUSSELTON2, the symbionts are suggested to be Desulfobacteraceae, that uses the hydrogenosome products from the host, including H_{2}, acetate and propionate, together with sulfate that they acquire through deep membrane-pits of the symbiosome to the cell-surrounding environment, in their metabolic pathways.
