= Gigantomonas =

Scientific classification
- Domain: Eukaryota
- Phylum: Metamonada
- Class: Cristamonadea
- Order: Gigantomonadida; Boscaro & Keeling 2024
- Family: Gigantomonadidae; Boscaro & Keeling 2024
- Genus: Gigantomonas; Dogiel 1916
- Species: G. herculea

Binomial name
- Gigantomonas herculea Dogiel 1916

Protist genus

Gigantomonas is a genus of parabasalid first described in 1916 and has with one known species, Gigantomonas herculea. It is found in the guts of termites of the family Hodotermidiae and shows many similarities to genus Trichomonas. It exists in three cell stages (flagellate, amoeboflagellate, and amoeba) and can be multinucleated or uninucleate. It also has some interesting interactions with parasites such as Holomastigotoides, which could have implications for research in this area.

== Etymology ==
When these cells were first discovered in 1916 by Russian scientist V. A. Dogiel, he remarked that these cells resembled genus Trichomonas in morphology but were greatly increased in cell size. The etymology is not directly mentioned, but this is likely the reason he termed this new genus "Gigantomonas."

== History ==
This genus and its type species were first described in 1916 by Russian scientist V. A. Dogiel. He provides a description of Gigantamonus herculea, samples of which he obtained from the digestive tracts of the termites in Africa. He describes it as a Trichomonas grown to a very large size. In 1932, Connel described a species he found in the guts of Paraneotermes simpluicornis as Gigantomonas lighti, but this was later proven to be a member of Macrotrichomonas. In the 1940s Kirby studied Gigantomonas, and after his death his work was passed on to Cleveland who studied Gigantomonas in considerable depth. In 2005, Brugerolle investigated Gigantomonas using immunological and ultrastructural techniques.

== Habitat and ecology ==
The type species was found in the gut of the termite Hodotermes mossambicus in what was known as British East Africa in 1914 and is still found there today. It is described as being 60-75 μm from the anterior end of the body to the axostyle and 30-35 μm in width, although some giant cells are observed occasionally.

The amoeboid stage of the cell can attach to the walls of the lumen of the termite hindgut. The cells feed mostly on pieces of wood, grass, and other flagellated protists found in the same host. Some cells are observed to be full of wood, while others have barely any.

Gigantomonas also has a reciprocal parasitic relationship with Holomastigotoides that Cleveland repeatedly observed. Hordes of small Holomastigotoides cells congregate around Gigantomonas cells and eventually adhere to the cell surface. Initially, many of these cells are then taken into Gigantomonas where they can be observed in various food vacuoles and are presumably digested. Eventually, the appearance of the nuclei and the cytoplasm become abnormal and the cell is destroyed from the inside, and the Holomastigotoides disperse. There exists a relationship between the two species where the ingested cells are capable of destroying the cells that prey on them. Gigantomonas is also observed to have an unusually large number and variety of parasites associated with it.

== Description ==
The cells have an oval-shaped body and a needle-like axostyle most visible on the posterior end. On the ventral side, the cell has four flagella arising from a tubercle. One of these is larger than the others and together, they are used for locomotion.

An undulating membrane starts at the base of the flagella. It passes over the dorsal side and returns to the ventral one. The membrane lies in a furrow set inside the body wall of the cell. The axostyle also plays a large role in maintaining the cell shape and is shaped like a thick spindle. The anterior end starts somewhere near the nucleus and the posterior end continues caudally. The axostyle is covered in a thin layer of plasma membrane. Large, clear pseudopodia are visible in all life stages.

There appear to be three different cell morphologies present in the genus. One is a Trichomonas-like ovoid cell with an axostyle. The cell has also been observed in an amoeboid state. In addition to this, there is also a state where the cell forms a plasmodial amoeba with no flagellar apparatus and multiple nuclei. This unusual morphology is the rationale Boscaro et al. use to classify Gigantomonas under its own order and family. However, Cleveland suggests that Gigantomonas may be flagellate under normal conditions and appears amoeboid when undergoing cell division.

The amoeboid cells demonstrate a granular accumulation near the center which also includes the nucleus. There are also internalized flagella, Golgi bodies, hydrogenosomes, food particles, bacteria, and wood particles inside the cell.

In the amoeboid stage, the cells have atractophores at the origin of spindle fibers during cell division as well as at the base of the flagella in interphase, as well as long parallel microfilaments, structures usually found in Trichomonas. The dividing cells also demonstrate a paradesmosis which is detectable via staining. There is a relatively small parabasal apparatus near the nucleus with smaller, striated fibers supporting the various Golgi throughout the cell. The amoeboid stage also has a karyomastigont system that includes nucleus, flagella, parabasal bodies, and axostyle.

Cells exist in uninucleate and multinucleate forms, with the latter being more common. The chromosomes are very small and are around a hundred. During cell division, binary fission and multiple fission are both observed but multiple fission occurs at a higher frequency. At any given time, there is only one set of extranuclear organelles associated with a given nucleus, with the exception of centrioles.

== Practical importance ==
Gigantomonas has exclusively been found in the guts of termites in Africa. They do not appear parasitic to their hosts and feed mostly on plant matter within the host gut. However, their flagellated stages are very similar to the genus Trichomonas, which could have important implications for research and prevention on infections since Trichomonas vaginalis is associated with human STIs. This genus also displays some interesting interaction with various parasitic organisms like Holomastigotodes. Further research into this area could help elucidate dynamics of parasitism at the unicellular level.
