= Poecilogony =

The term poecilogony was coined by Alfred Mathieu Giard to describe a polymorphism in larval development in marine invertebrates. To date, this life history trait is only known in a small number of polychaete taxa, as well as some sacoglossan mollusks. In some cases, the variation in larval type is a 'plastic' trait in that it is environmentally mediated. In other cases, the larval type is genetically determined - a good example is the polychaete Streblospio benedicti, where some mothers release small planktotrophic eggs and other mothers release large lecithotrophic eggs. In either case, the variation in larval type generally involves the production of larvae that differ in feeding mode and/or developmental time.
