= Barbulanymphidae =

Scientific classification
- Domain: Eukaryota
- Clade: Metamonada
- Phylum: Parabasalia
- Class: Trichonymphea
- Order: Trichonymphida
- Family: Barbulanymphidae

Family of protists

Barbulanymphidae is a family of protists.

This family comprises two genera:

- Barbulanympha
- Urinympha
