= Alfred Mathieu Giard =

French zoologist (1846–1908)

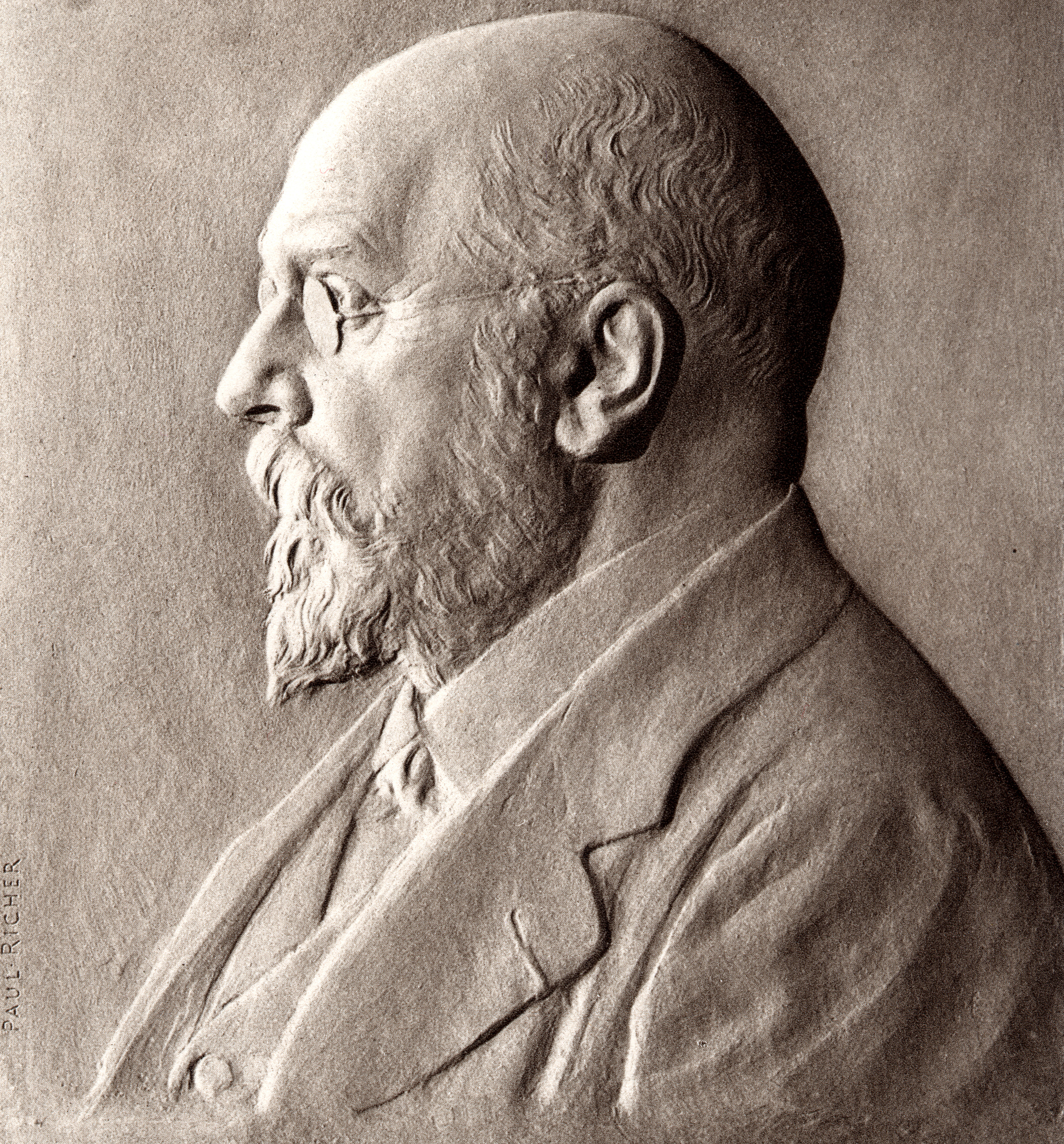
Alfred Mathieu Giard by Paul Richer

Alfred Mathieu Giard (8 August 1846 – 8 August 1908) was a French zoologist born in Valenciennes. He served as a professor of zoology at the Faculty of Sciences in Lille. He specialized in parasitology, and the genus Giardia was named after him by Johann Künstler in 1882.

== Biography ==
Giard was born in Valenciennes to grocer Alfred François Émile and Jeanne Henriette Mortamais. At an early age he became interested in plants and insects. In 1867, he began his studies of natural sciences at the École Normale Supérieure, followed by work as préparateur de zoologie at the laboratory of Henri de Lacaze-Duthiers (1821–1901) in Paris and later the teratologist Gabriel Dareste de la Chavanne. In 1872, he defended his doctoral thesis with a study on compound ascidians titled "Recherches sur les ascidies composées ou synascidies". From 1873 to 1882, he was professeur suppléant of natural history at the faculty of sciences in Lille, and in the meantime, was also affiliated with the Institut industriel du Nord. In 1874, he founded a biological station at Wimereux in order to familiarize his students to marine and terrestrial organisms. At Lille, he is credited for putting together an active school of zoology. He also popularized the study of animal behaviour among his students. He also lectured at the School of Medicine and Pharmacy in Lille.

In 1887, he became a lecturer at the École Normale Supérieure, and from 1888 until his death. He became a full professor in 1892 at the faculty of sciences in Paris, holding the chair of "evolution of living organisms". Following his death, he was succeeded at the Wimereux station by Maurice Caullery (1868–1958). Among his numerous students and assistants was philosopher of science Félix Le Dantec (1869–1917). Giard was influenced by the work of Ernst Haeckel, and considered Lamarckism and Darwinism to be complementary theories. From 1904 to 1908 he was president of the Société de biologie.

Giard married Annie Bond-Cooke in 1892 in Paris. He died in Orsay on 8 August 1908, his 62th birthday.

== Research ==
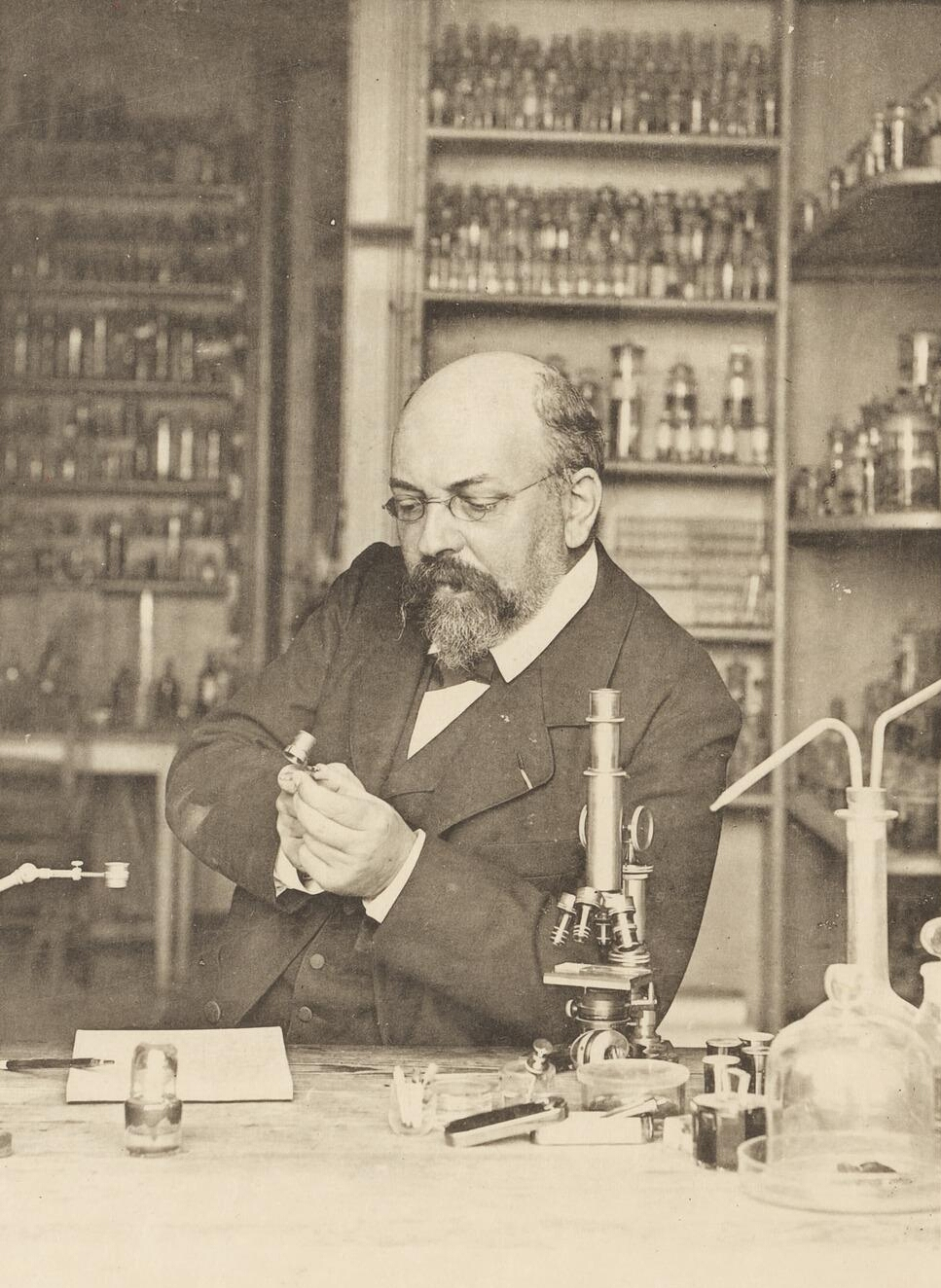
Giard in 1899

Giard was especially interested in the relationship between host and parasite in nature (both plants and animals), and used the term "parasitic castration" to define sexual characteristic changes in the host as a result of the parasite, even when the sex glands of the host are not directly involved. He is credited for providing a description of Giardia lamblia, a gastrointestinal protozoan parasite that is named after himself and Czech medical doctor Vilém Dušan Lambl (1824–1895). The illness associated with the parasite is sometimes called giardiasis. In 1877, he was the first scientist to describe the phylum Orthonectida (parasites of Ophiurida).

In 1894, he introduced the term "anhydrobiosis" (the ability of organisms to survive extreme dehydration). In 1905 Giard coined the word poecilogonie (poecilogony) to describe a phenomenon in which similar adults develop from dissimilar larvae in marine invertebrates.

Although Christian, Giard supported Darwinian ideas which he called as "transformism" and wrote about these ideas in the periodical Bulletin scientifique de France et de Belgique that he founded in 1888.

He is remembered for his extensive research of crustaceans, particularly Epicaridea (parasitic isopods) and members of the family Bopyridae. Amongst his very numerous publications are 300 devoted to entomology. He was a figure of importance in applied entomology in France and a member of the Société entomologique de France.

== Other sources ==
- Lhoste, J. 1987 Les entomologistes français. 1750–1950. INRA (Institut National de la Recherche Agronomique), Paris.
- Mathieu Guerriaud, « Etudier à l'école de pharmacie de Lille avec Alfred Giard au XIXe siècle», Revue d'Histoire de la Pharmacie, vol. LXIII, no 386, 2015, p. 261–278 (ISSN 0035-2349, lire en ligne)
- Peyerimhoff, P. de 1932 La Société entomologique de France (1832–1931). Soc. Ent. France, Livre du Centenaire, Paris.
- "Alfred Mathieu Giard". Who Named It. Archived from the original on July 26, 2024.
