= Barthelonid =

- Light micrograph of Barthelona vulgaris, with flagella marked by arrowheads. Scale bar: 10 µm.

Scientific classification
- Domain: Eukaryota
- Supergroup: Metamonada
- Phylum: incertae sedis
- Class: Notopharyngea
- Order: Barthelonida; Shiratori et al. 2026
- Family: Barthelonidae; Shiratori et al. 2026

Genera
- Barthelona; Microbarthelona; Parabarthelona

Diversity
- 3 species

Order of flagellates

Barthelonids are a group of anaerobic flagellates with two flagella. They belong to the Metamonada, a diverse group of anaerobes. In particular, they are closely related to skoliomonads, but are distinguished in having a more reduced ventral groove and lacking a flagellar vane. There are three described genera of barthelonids, each with one species, all grouped as a family Barthelonidae and order Barthelonida within the class Notopharyngea.

== Description ==
Barthelonids are flagellates, unicellular protists (a type of eukaryote) that use flagella for movement. They are anaerobic organisms that live swimming (or more rarely gliding) freely, consuming bacteria. Each cell presents a ventral groove, a feeding structure found in excavates, but the barthelonid groove is markedly reduced in comparison to that of skoliomonads and other metamonads, as it is less distinct and lacks a flagellar vane.

== Taxonomy ==
The first described barthelonid species was Barthelona vulgaris, first reported in 2000 from flagellate cells isolated from marine sediment in Australia. This species, only characterized through light microscopy, remained with no clear taxonomic affinities. In 2020, five strains of Barthelona were isolated and genetically analyzed, revealing their position as a deep branch of Metamonada, a diverse group of anaerobic eukaryotes.

In 2026, some of these strains were further described and separated into their own species, each contained in a different genus: Microbarthelona vorax and Parabarthelona vacuolata, bringing the total number of barthelonid species to three. The new observations brought additional information on the traits that distinguish barthelonids from all other metamonads, and consequently a new family Barthelonidae and order Barthelonida were established. These were placed in a new class Notopharyngea, which also contains skoliomonads, placed in the order Skoliomonadida.
