= Monocercomonas =

Scientific classification
- Domain: Eukaryota
- Clade: Metamonada
- Phylum: Parabasalia
- Clade: "Cadamassta"
- Class: Monocercomonadea
- Order: Monocercomonadida
- Family: Monocercomonadidae
- Genus: Monocercomonas; Grassi, 1879

Unicellular genus

Monocercomonas is a Parabasalian genus belonging to the order Trichomonadida. It presents four flagella, three forward-facing and one trailing, without the presence of a costa or any kind of undulating membrane. Monocercomonas is found in animal guts. and is susceptible to cause Monocercomoniasis in reptiles

== Etymology ==
Mono: single, kerko: tail (one trailing flagella) monas from monad.

== History ==
The first description of this genus was made by Grassi in 1979. Monocercomonas sp. was initially found in snake guts. The taxa was independently discovered by Kofoid and Swezy in 1915, and named Eutrichomastix. Monocercomonas is discovered in beetle guts in 1966, and later found in other invertebrate species.

== Habitat ==
Monocercomonas has been identified in Japan, Southern California and South Africa, as well as in the Pacific Ocean, west of Chile with a DNA sample from the Tara Ocean mission.

Monocercomonas is a symbiote living in animal guts : it is present in the intestine of several reptiles and birds, as well as the hindgut of the wood-eating cockroach Parasphaeria boleiriana. It was also found in domestic birds such as the Chicken (Gallus gallus) and Ducks (Anas sp.). Monocercomonas is an anaerobic organism that doesn't digest wood despite being found in wood-eating organisms; it is possibly a parasite for snakes, as it was found in abundance in sick snakes guts as well as other organs (lungs and oviducts) and was associated with mortality of the snakes. However it was also found in healthy animals. Monocercomonas needs a nutrient-rich substrate to subsist, and lives in anaerobic environments.

== Morphology ==
=== General morphology ===
Monocercomonas are single celled flagellated eucaryotes. The most commonly occurring form of the cell is a trophozoite. Their body shape is roughly oval, measuring approximately 10 μm in length and 3 μm in width, although some specimen assume a more spherical shape (save for the axostylar trunk). Monocercomonas have four flagella, three pointing forward measuring approximately 17μm, and one trailing behind the organism, the recurrent flagellum, measuring approximately 30μm. Their axostyle, characteristic of Parabasalians protrudes at the opposite of the cell from the flagellar implantation (posterior side). It measures roughly 5μm, is made out of a rolled sheet of microtubules, and forms a trunk where it protrudes, as it is surrounded by the cell membrane.

=== Anatomy ===
The axostyle of Monocercomonas sp. is composed of 13 protofilaments of parallel microtubules, associated with a lateral projection of two protofilaments. The axostyle is connected to hydrogenosomes, the pelta, and endoplasmic reticulum.

Contrary to other genera of Trichomonad that present an undulating membreane associated to the trailing flagella, Monocercomonas does not have an undulating membrane attached to the trailing flagella, although there is a pelta at the anterior end of the organism, close to the periflagellar canal, attaching it partially to the body.

Monocercomonas has four basal bodies (=kinetosomes) corresponding to its four flagella. Three parallel basal bodies are at the origin of the anterior flagella and point towards the anterior side, the fourth is perpendicular to the others and is at the base of the trailing flagella. Two types of inclusion are seen through the cytoplasm. We also observe endoplasmic reticulum near the cell nucleus. All anterior flagella go through the periflagellar canal, the trailing flagellum does not.

Parabasal filaments are observed between the nucleus and a disc-shaped parabasal body (which is the Golgi body), a synapomorphy of Parabasalians

Monocercomonas is an early diverging branch of Trichomonadida, but the loss of pelta and other cytoskeletal structures in this genera is thought to be secondary, meaning that they were present in the Trichomonadida last common ancestor.

There are transitional fibers at the distal end of the kinetostomes, situated close and anteriorally to the parabasal body which displays a common cisternae organization for Golgi bodies. Parabasal filaments emerge from kinetosome complexes, none of them having the functionality of a cell costa, but the most dorsal one displaying a similar organization and positioning inside the cell as a Tritrichomonas (another genus of Trichomonads).

There are numerous glycogen granules (energy storage) around the cell nucleus, called perinuclear granula and inside the axostyle trunk, called endoaxostylary granula.

In the cytoplasm, Monocercomonas presents food vacuoles and hydrogenosomes.

== Metabolism ==
Hydrogenosomes allow Monocercomonas to perform anaerobic respiration as well as other metabolic pathways vital to the cell. According to Diniz et al. (2007):

In Monocercomonas sp. hydrogenosomes are spherical, rod-like or dumb-bell structures whereas in other trichomonads they are spherical or elongated structures (when in division). They present double membrane, which is positive for carbo- hydrates. The hydrogenosomes in Monocercomonas sp. do not follow the axostyle direction as described for other anaerobic protozoa such as T. foetus and T. vagirzulis.

The production of acetate and hydrogen and its possible advantages for the wood-eating, intermediate host has not been studied in Monocercomonas, but Monocercomonas does not present woodchips-filled food vacuoles despite living in wood-eating organisms : as such it is thought to be a parasite rather than a member of a mutually beneficial relationship for the wood-eating organism.

== Life cycle ==
=== Pseudocyst occurrence ===
A resistant pseudocyst can occur under adverse conditions, such as pH of 6.0 and under, high temperatures (37 °C) and nutrient depletion.

The pseudocyst forms by internalizing first the flagella, then the axostyle (retracting back into the body); The cell forms as cell wall and is surrounded by glycocalyx. The cytoplasm of the cysts contains the organelles including those that have been retracted and is more granular than in the trophozoite form

=== Reproduction ===
Asexual cell division has been described. The cell division is typical of Parabasalians, with kinetosomes becoming anterior/posterior, despite their previous positioning in the mother cell.

Monocercomonas has only been observed undergoing asexual reproduction. As an animal symbiont, it undergoes a direct life-cycle (without intermediary organism) and reaches animals by orofecal contamination, making it difficult to handle in small, enclosed spaces such as terrariums.

== Pathogenicity ==
Reptiles infected with Monocercomonas may develop monocercomoniasis (a proliferation of Monocercomonas in the gut, eventually causing lesions and disrupting the gut fauna), which causes them to stop eating, lose weight and show digestive discomfort; the disease can be deadly. In some cases there has been colic, gut necrosis and infertile eggs. In terrarium, the disease can be transmitted between snakes within weeks. However Monocercomoniasis does not present in all snakes infected with Monocercomonas. Immune system function, stress exposure and the species of snake (due to host specificity; garter snakes are to host Monocercomonas without developing symptoms) can increase the risk of a symptomatic infection. Pneumonia in snakes can also be caused by Monocercomonas, and Monocercomonas can spread to the female reproductive system, causing inflammation.

- Lineage : cellular organisms; Eukaryota; Metamonada; Parabasalia; Tritrichomonadida; Monocercomonadidae; Monocercomonas

Subgenus : Alimonas (no pelta), Quadrimonas (longer pelta), Monocercomonas (very short pelta). When there is an accessory filament (pelta) present, it is parallel to the trailing flagella but intracellular.

== List of Monocercomonas species ==
- Monocercomonas molae
- Monocercomonas motellae
- Monocercomonas colubrorum
- Monocercomonas ruminantium
- Monocercomonas cuniculi
- Monocercomonas minutante
- Monocercomonas pistillum
- Monocercomonas minuta
