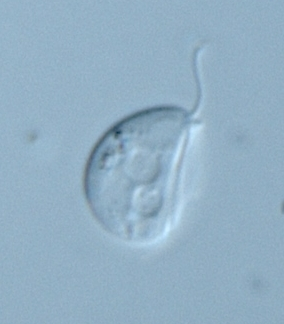

Scientific classification
- Domain: Eukaryota
- Clade: Metamonada
- Phylum: Fornicata
- Class: Carpomonadea
- Order: Dysnectida
- Family: Dysnectidae
- Genus: Dysnectes; Yubuki et al., 2007
- Species: D. brevis

Binomial name
- Dysnectes brevis Yubuki et al., 2007

= Dysnectes =

Genus of protist

Dysnectes brevis is a member of Fornicata.
