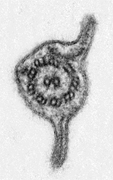
- Electron micrograph of Chilomastix cuspidata. The "9+2" axoneme and the enclosing membrane can be seen, the flagellum has two vanes.

Scientific classification
- Domain: Eukaryota
- Clade: Metamonada
- Phylum: Fornicata
- Order: Retortamonadida
- Family: Retortamonadidae
- Genus: Chilomastix; Aléxéieff, 1910

Species
- C. aulostomi Bělař 1921; C. bandicooti Todd 1963; C. bettencourti da Fonseca 1915; C. bocis Aléxéieff 1912; C. bursa Moskowitz 1951; C. caprae da Fonseca 1915; C. caulleryi (Aléxéieff 1909) Aléxéieff 1910; C. cuniculi da Fonseca 1916; C. cuspidata (Larsen & Patterson 1990) Bernard et al. 1997; C. echinorum Powers 1936; C. equi Abraham 1961; C. gadrii Krishnamurthy 1970; C. gallinarum Martin & Robertson 1911; C. giganta Nie 1948; C. graecae Navarathnam 1971; C. granatensis Rodríguez López-Neyra & Suárez-Peregrín 1932; C. hemidactyli Madre 1979; C. hyderabadensis Todd 1963; C. intestinalis Kuczynski 1914; C. instabilis Crouch 1936; C. kudoi; C. magna Becker 1926; C. megamorpha Abraham 1961; C. mesnili; C. motellae; C. muris; C. navasi da Fonseca 1940; C. nigricollisi Todd 1963; C. olympioi; C. osmaniae Navarathnam 1971; C. palmari Todd 1963; C. peccarii; C. quadrii; C. rosenbuschi da Fonseca 1916; C. simiae; C. suis; C. tarsii Porter 1952; C. undulata Skuja 1956; C. wenrichi Nie 1948

Synonyms
- Macrostoma Aléxéieff 1909 non Risso 1826 non Hedwig 1806 non Latreille 1825 non Griffith 1836 non Agassiz 1839; Cyathomastix Prowazek & Werner 1915; Tetrachilomastix (da Fonseca 1915) da Fonseca 1920; Chilomastix (Tetrachilomastix) da Fonseca 1915; Fanapepea Prowazek 1911; Difamus Gäbel 1914

= Chilomastix =

Genus of flagellates

Chilomastix is a genus of pyriform excavates within the family Retortamonadidae. All species within this genus are flagellated, structured with three flagella pointing anteriorly and a fourth contained within the feeding groove. Chilomastix also lacks Golgi apparatus and mitochondria but does possess a single nucleus. The genus parasitizes a wide range of vertebrate hosts, but is known to be typically non-pathogenic, and is therefore classified as harmless. The life cycle of Chilomastix lacks an intermediate host or vector. Chilomastix has a resistant cyst stage responsible for transmission and a trophozoite stage, which is recognized as the feeding stage. Chilomastix mesnili is one of the more studied species in this genus due to the fact it is a human parasite. Therefore, much of the information on this genus is based on what is known about this one species.

== History of knowledge ==
The nomenclature of this genus has been under much dispute throughout history, switching between many different taxonomic names. The first known report of this genus was in 1854 when patients in Paris showed infection by a parasitic flagellate. The human parasite was classified under the name of Cercomonas hominis var. 1 by Davaine (1854). In 1910, it was reclassified as its own species and named Macrostoma mesnili by Charles Morley Wenyon, an English protozoologist. It was again renamed to Chilomastix davainei (syn. Chilomastix mesnili) in 1920 by Kofoid. The origin of the name Chilomastix however, was before 1920. The initial proposal of Chilomastix being its own genus was urged by Alexeieffe in 1912 who was the first to thoroughly describe a species belonging to this genus. Although he initially called it Tetramitus caulleryi in 1910, he then referred it is as its own genus, Chilomastix in 1912.

== Habitat and ecology ==
=== Geographical distribution ===
Chilomastix has a worldwide distribution; Chilomastix mesnili is considered a cosmopolitan species, having been found in marine, freshwater and brackish waters. This genus, however, is more prevalent in warmer climates.

=== Microenvironment ===
The cyst stage of the organism if often found in feces where it can thrive away from a host, until it is ingested. The trophozoite stage resides in the intestine of its host where it feeds on intestinal bacteria.

=== Parasitic hosts ===
Species within this genus are known to parasitize a wide variety of mammalian hosts including humans, monkeys, chimpanzees, apes, and pigs. Bird hosts, as seen in ostriches, rheas, chickens and geese, as well as invertebrate hosts such as insects have also been documented.

== Life cycle ==
The life cycle is direct, requiring no intermediate host or vector. Chilomastix exists as a cyst stage that is responsible for transmission and a trophozoite stage which is also known as the feeding stage. Transmission occurs via the fecal-oral route when water contaminated with feces that contain Chilomastix cysts is ingested. The uptake of cysts by the host leads to the excystation of one trophozoite per cyst, which then multiply via binary fission and reside within the intestine of the host. Trophozoites feed on the host's intestinal contents such as bacteria through endocytosis. Once the intestinal contents begin to dry out, the trophozoites then release a cyst wall through the process of encystation. Cysts are resistant and do not require feeding to survive, thus once the food source begins to run out, stimulation of encystation occurs. Both trophozoites and cysts are passed in the feces but only cysts can survive outside of the host and are therefore the stage of infection. When exposed to the external environment, the trophozoites disintegrate while the cysts remain living in bodies of water until they are again taken up by the next host, continuing the cycle of transmission.

== Feeding mechanisms ==
Within the intestine of the host, Chilomastix trophozoites feed via endocytosis. This brings the particles into the cell and stimulates the formation of a food vacuole. Chilomastix often feeds on bacteria living inside the gut of the host. The cytosomal flagellum aids in bringing intestinal bacteria closer towards the cell, allowing the membrane to wrap around the food particle and pinch off to form a food vacuole within the cell body. The cyst stage is non-feeding.

== Pathogenesis ==
Chilomastix species are generally regarded as harmless gut commensals and are non-pathogenic. They are typically asymptomatic as severity of infection is usually no higher than seen in Chilomastix mesnili and C. gallinarum, known to cause watery diarrhea.

=== Diagnosis ===
Chilomastix species are often transmitted along with other intestinal parasites, many of which are pathogenic and do cause diseases such as Giardia lamblia and Balantidium coli. This commonly causes confusion during diagnosis. Diagnosis is made upon finding one or both cyst and trophozoite forms in feces samples of an infected patient.

=== Treatment ===
Due to the non-pathogenic nature of this taxon, no treatments are required except to relieve the discomfort of the diarrhea in extreme cases. If the infected patient is showing other symptoms of disease, it is most likely due to the presence of another parasitic pathogen and further testing should be done.

== Morphology and anatomy ==
Chilomastix cells are not bilaterally symmetrical and lack mitochondria, an axostyle, Golgi apparatus, and an undulating membrane.

=== Trophozoites ===
Trophozoites of Chilomastix have been described as pyriform, lemon-shaped or pear-shaped in various species with a rounded anterior and an elongated posterior end that comes to a point. Four flagella are present in all species; three flagella extend anteriorly and move freely, while the fourth flagellum is located within the feeding groove that acts as the cell mouth. This fourth, posteriorly orientated flagellum is vaned, due to the presence of two wing-like structures that extend from it. The feeding groove and fourth flagellum are positioned in the anterior region of the body and work together, involved in the function of endocytosis, enabling the movement of food particles towards the feeding groove. The flagella possess the 9+2 structure, common in flagellated eukaryotes. A single distinct nucleus is in the very anterior region of the body near the cytoplasm.

==== Cysts ====
Cysts are lemon or pear shaped, typically rounder and smaller than the trophozoite. One end of the cyst cell is rounded while the other end has a slight, blunt protuberance. The cyst wall is of even thickness except in the region of the protuberance where it is even thicker. Organelles found in the trophozoite, including the nucleus and cytostome, remain in the cyst stage and are usually viewable when stained under the microscope. While the vaned flagellum is present in the cyst stage, the three free anterior flagella are not, thus making the cyst non-motile.
