= Vilém Dušan Lambl =

Czech medical doctor

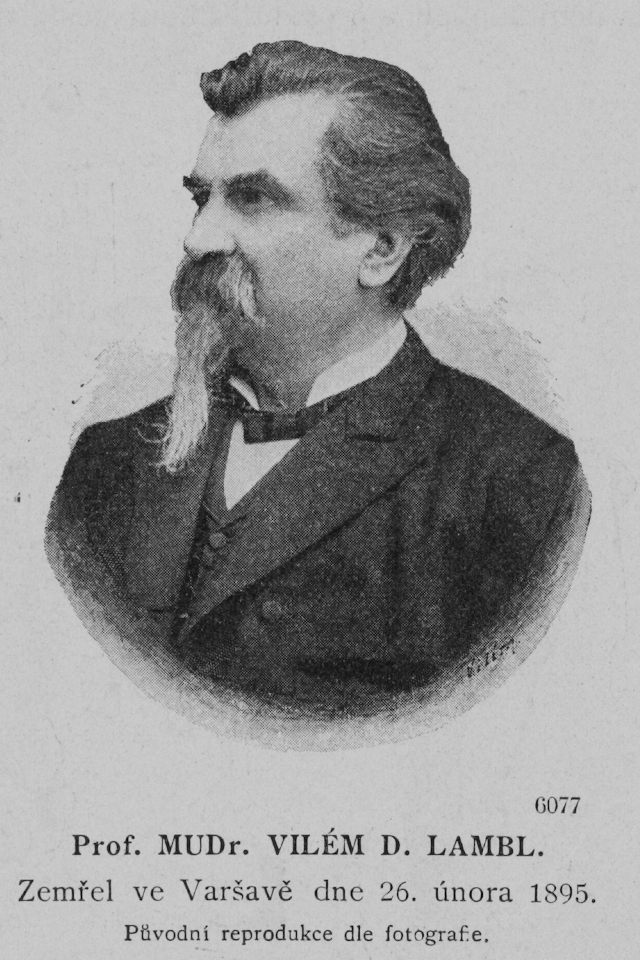
Portrait of Lambl

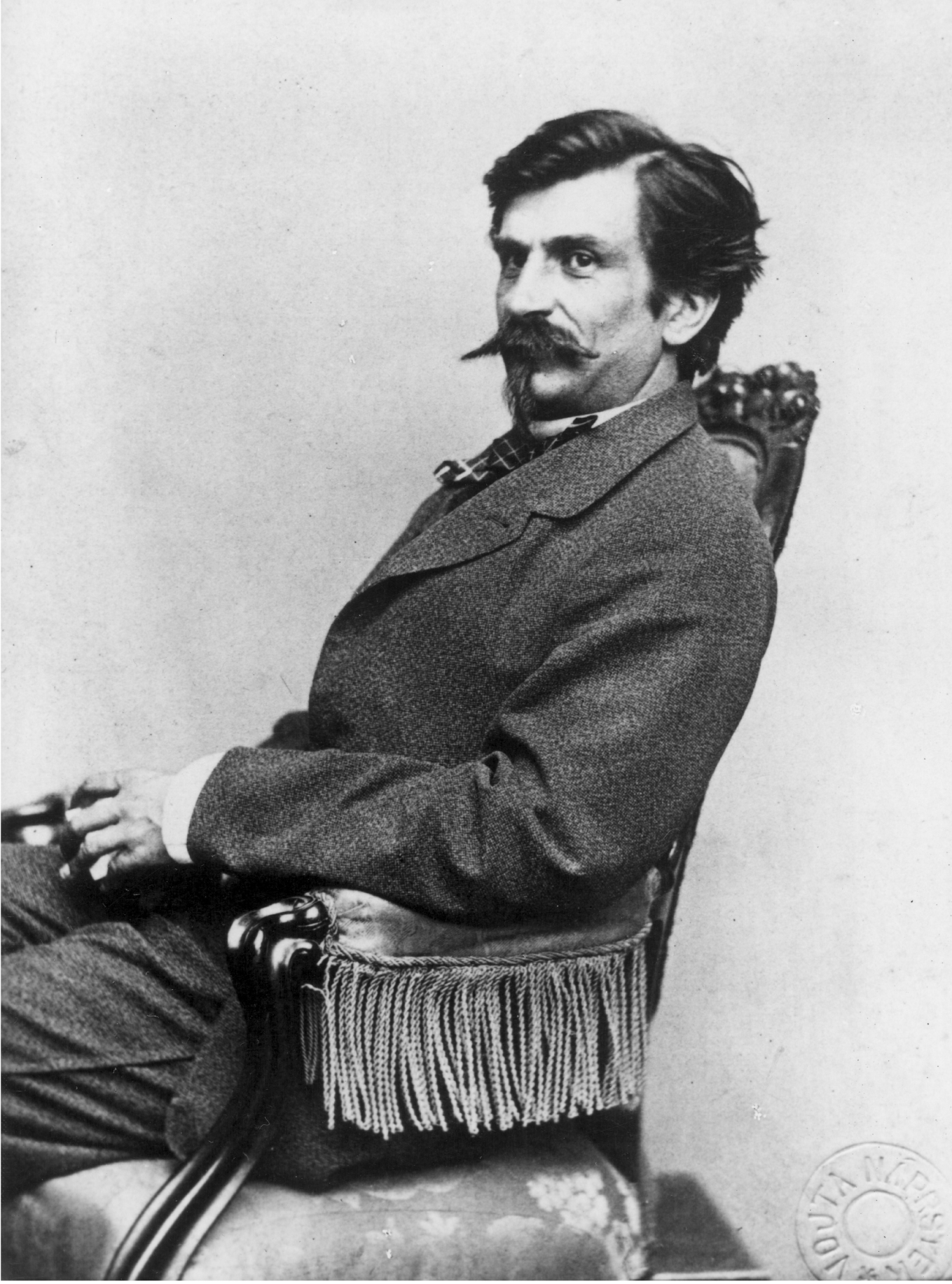
Lambl photographed as a young man

Vilém Dušan Lambl (5 December 1824 – 12 February 1895) was a Czech medical doctor. He authored his medical publications, which were in German, as Wilhelm Lambl.

== Life ==
Lambl was born on 5 December 1824 in Letiny in Bohemia, Austrian Empire. He had a keen interest in the field of linguistics, particularly Slavic languages. After earning his degree in medicine from the University of Prague, he traveled extensively in Bosnia-Herzegovina, Croatia, Serbia, Dalmatia, and Montenegro, conducting research on South Slavic languages and culture. Following his return to Prague, he worked both at Josef von Löschner's children's hospital and as a lecturer at the University of Prague until 1860, when he accepted a position at Kharkiv University. In 1871, he became a professor at the University of Warsaw.

He is remembered for his description of an intestinal protozoan parasite that was initially discovered by Anton van Leeuwenhoek (1632–1723), and is a cause of gastroenteritis. Lambl called the protozoan Cercomonas intestinalis. In 1888 the name was changed to Lamblia intestinalis by zoologist Émile Blanchard (1819–1900). In 1915 the species was renamed to Giardia lamblia by American zoologist Charles Wardell Stiles (1867–1941) in honor of Lambl and French biologist Alfred Mathieu Giard (1846–1908). Today the illness caused by the parasite is called either "lambliasis" or "giardiasis".

With Löschner, he published "Aus dem Franz Josef-Kinder-Spitale in Prag", Part one: "Beobachtungen und Studien aus dem Gebiete der pathologischen Anatomie und Histologie" (1860), ("From the Franz-Josefs-Kinder-Spital in Prague, Observations and studies from the fields of pathological anatomy and histology").

Lambl excrescences, which he described in a publication from 1856, are still important today as an anatomic feature essential to physiologic valvular coaptation; especially in the aortic valve.

== Eponym named after Lambl ==
- Lambl's excrescences: Small fibrin deposits on the aortic valve.
- Lambl's excrescences: Foot of a gecko guiding valvular coaptation.
