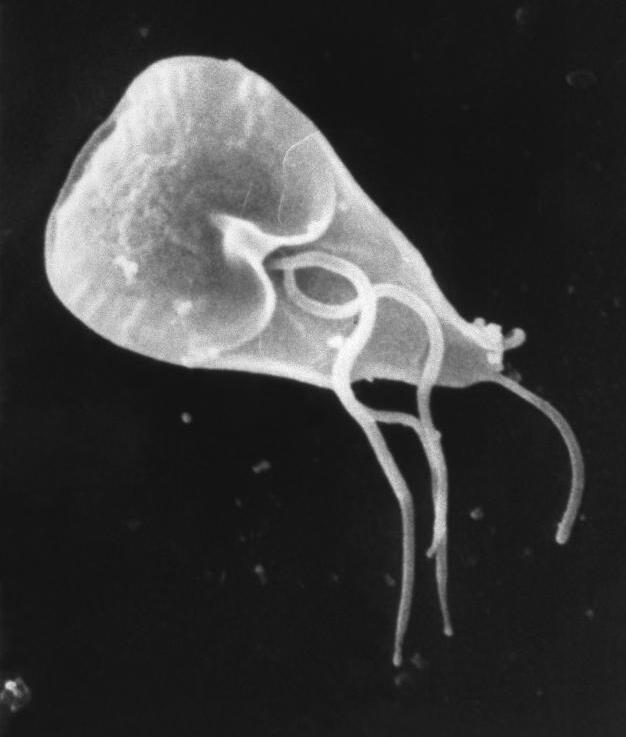
- Giardia trophozoite, SEM

Scientific classification
- Domain: Eukaryota
- Supergroup: Metamonada
- Phylum: Fornicata
- Order: Diplomonadida
- Family: Hexamitidae
- Subfamily: Giardiinae
- Genus: Giardia; Künstler, 1882

Species
- Giardia agilis; Giardia ardeae; Giardia duodenalis; Giardia microti; Giardia muris; Giardia psittaci

Synonyms
- Lamblia R. Blanchard, 1888

= Giardia =

Genus of flagellate intestinal eukaryotes parasitic in various vertebrates

Giardia (/dʒiːˈɑːrdiə/ or /ˈdʒɑːrdiə/) is a genus of zoonotic anaerobic flagellated protozoan parasites of the phylum Metamonada that colonise and reproduce in the small intestines of several vertebrates including humans, causing the disease giardiasis. Their life cycle alternates between a binucleated motile trophozoite and an infective, metabolically inert, environmentally resistant tetranucleate cyst. Cysts are transmitted between hosts through the fecal–oral route, contaminated water and/or food. Giardia were first seen by the Dutch microscopist Antonie van Leeuwenhoek in 1681 under the light microscope. The genus is named after French zoologist Alfred Mathieu Giard.

== Characteristics ==
Giardia trophozoites are 12–15 μm long and 5–9 μm wide and have a shape of a pear bisected lengthwise. Like other diplomonads, Giardia has two transcriptionally operational nuclei that contain an equal number of well-defined chromosomes and replicate synchronously with cell division. The cytoskeleton of Giarida consists of a median body, 4 pairs of flagella (anterior, ventral, posterior and caudal) and an adhesive disc. Giardia lacks canonical mitochondria and Golgi complexes; instead, it possesses an endomembrane-vesicle system as well as reduced mitochondria, called mitosomes. These mitosomes are involved in the maturation of iron-sulfur proteins and do not participate in ATP synthesis. The adhesive disc, located on the ventral side, allows the parasite to attach itself to the host's intestinal epithelium. Trophozoites multiply via binary fission in the small intestine and encyst during the passage towards the large intestine.

Giardia cysts are immotile, oval-shaped, sturdy units about 8–12 μm by 7–10 μm. The cyst wall is ~0.4 μm thick and is composed of cyst wall proteins (CWP1, 2, 3) and N-acetylgalactosamine. The cyst bears four tetraploid nuclei inside as well as all the other organelles, some disassembled. Nuclei in the cyst are in a close contact with each other and genetic material exchange (diplomixis) may occur between them, at least in some Giardia species. Upon excystation, which takes place after cyst ingestion, each cyst releases two trophozoites.

== Systematics ==
G. duodenalis is a species complex. Eight morphologically similar but genetically distinct Giardia assemblages (species/clades) have been identified based on genome sequencing; each assemblage has been assigned a letter between A and H. Every assemblage contains several subassemblages (subspecies or genotypes). Assemblages and sub-assemblages have different host specificity. Assemblages A and B occur in humans and many other vertebrates, assemblage C and D in canids, assemblage E in hoofed animals, assemblage F in cats, assemblage G in rodents, and assemblage H in pinnipeds.

The assemblage A has been further divided into groups: AI, AII and AIII, based on genetic and biological differences. AI is a highly homogeneous group in which minimal sequence differences among isolates (about 300 SNPs) and low allelic heterozygosity. AI is found primarily in animals and is mainly zoonotic. AII, on the other hand, occurs mainly in humans, has a high level of variability in sequence between isolates (about 30K SNPs), and a high allelic sequence heterozygosity. Similar division is characteristic for assemblage B, where BIII and BIV isolates are distinguished by host range and genetic differences. Systematics of other assemblages remains to be established.

== Phylogeny ==
Giardia is an early diverging eukaryote. This is supported by several features: their lack of ATP-synthesizing mitochondria (see Characteristics) and other organelles, as well as their primitive metabolic pathways.

== Genome ==
A Giardia isolate (WB, AI genotype) was the first diplomonad to have its genome sequenced. Its almost 12 million basepair-long genome is compact in structure and content, with simplified basic cellular machineries and metabolism. There are about 5000 genes in Giardia genome. Clinical isolates of B assemblage, along with a pig isolate of E assemblage are also whole-genome sequenced. The E assemblage is more closely related to the A assemblage than is the B. A number of chromosomal rearrangements are distinguishable between assemblages.

Currently, the genomes of other Giardia isolates and other diplomonads (Spironucleus, Hexamita) are whole-genome sequenced. Genome assemblies are available in several databases (e.g. giardiadb.org).

== Infection ==
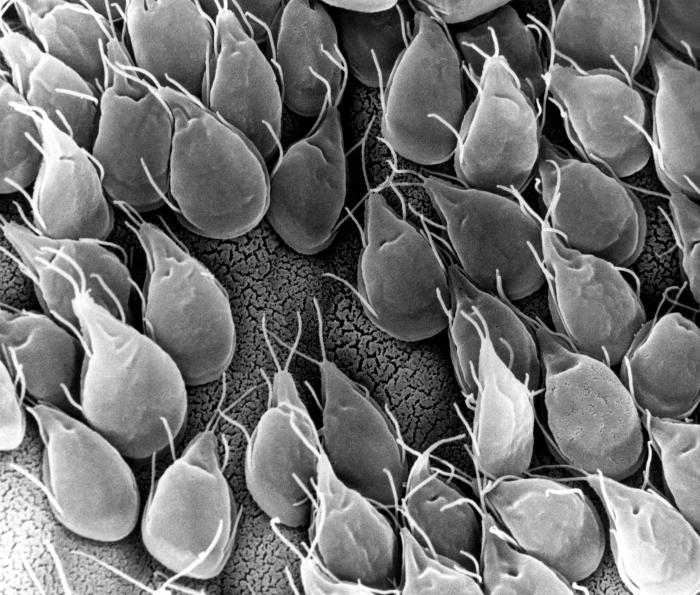
An SEM micrograph of the small intestine of a gerbil infested with Giardia reveals a mucosa surface almost entirely obscured by attached trophozoites

Giardia lives, in its motile trophozoite form, in the intestines of infected humans or other animals, individuals of which become infected by ingesting or coming into contact with contaminated foods, soil, or water tainted by the feces of an infected carrier. In order to spread to new hosts, Giardia forms environmentally resistant cysts, which can be spread via the fecal-oral route. The infectious dose is very low (1–10 cysts).

The symptoms of Giardia, which may begin to appear 3–25 days after infection, can include mild to profound fatty diarrhea, excess gas, stomach or abdominal cramps, upset stomach, and nausea. Resulting dehydration and nutritional loss may need immediate treatment. A typical infection can be slight, resolve without treatment, and last between 2 and 6 weeks, although it can sometimes last longer and/or be more severe. Coexistence with the parasite is possible (symptoms fade), but an infected host can remain a carrier and transmit it to others. Medication containing tinidazole or metronidazole decreases symptoms and time to resolution. Albendazole is also used, and has an anthelmintic (anti-worm) property as well, ideal for certain compounded issues when a general vermicidal agent is preferred. Giardia infestation causes the microvilli of the small intestine to atrophy and flatten, resulting in malabsorption in the intestine. Lactose intolerance can persist after the eradication of Giardia from the digestive tract.

== Prevalence ==
The prevalence of the infection depends on different factors; while the prevalence is estimated around 2% in some developed countries, in other countries from Asia, Africa or Latin America, the prevalence can be estimated between 20% and 40%. In some patients, giardiasis can be completely asymptomatic, so many more cases are estimated. The diagnostic method used can also infer in the identification and thus the count of cases. Due to their lack of knowledge and overall behavioral patterns, children aged under 5 years are the population with the most reported infections.

== See also ==
- List of parasites (human)
