= Retortamonad =

- Retortamonas (Retortamonadida), on left; Hexamita, on center, and Giardia, on right (both Diplomonadida)

Scientific classification
- Domain: Eukaryota
- Supergroup: Metamonada
- Phylum: Fornicata
- Order: Retortamonadida; Grassé, 1952
- Family: Retortamonadidae; Wenrich, 1932

Genera
- "Retortamonas"; "Chilomastix"

Group of flagellates

The retortamonads are a small group of flagellates, most commonly found in the intestines of animals as commensals, although a free-living species called the Chilomastix cuspidata exists. They are grouped under the taxon Archezoa. They are usually around 5-20 μm in length, and all of their small subunit ribosomal RNA gene sequences are very similar to each other. There are two genera: Retortamonas with two flagella, and Chilomastix with four. In both cases there are four basal bodies anterior to a prominent feeding groove, and one flagellum is directed back through the cell, emerging from the groove.

The retortamonads lack mitochondria, golgi apparatus, dictyosomes, and peroxisomes. They are close relatives of the diplomonads, and are placed among the metamonads along with them. Due to the abundant phylogenetic similarities between the two flagellates, since diplomonads do not ancestrally lack mitochondrion, this suggests that retortamonads are also secondarily amitochondriate.

The group itself and both its genera are paraphyletic.
