= Skoliomonas =

Scientific classification
- Domain: Eukaryota
- Clade: Metamonada
- Class: Notopharyngea
- Order: Skoliomonadida; Shiratori et al., 2026
- Family: Skoliomonadidae; Shiratori et al., 2026
- Genus: Skoliomonas; Eglit & Simpson, 2024
- Species: S. litria

Binomial name
- Skoliomonas litria Eglit & Simpson, 2024

Type strain
- TZLM1-RC

Genus of basal eukaryotes

Skoliomonas is a genus of anaerobic protists closely related to barthelonids, a small group of basal eukaryotes within the phylum Metamonada. It is a monotypic genus containing the sole species Skoliomonas litria. Members of this genus are informally named skoliomonads. They are found inhabiting hypersaline alkaline lakes in Tanzania and North America.

== Etymology ==
The name Skoliomonas derives from Greek σκολιός (skolios) 'bent', 'crooked', which refers to the hunched appearance of the cell and the twisted venral groove, and μονάς (monas) 'unit', a common suffix used for unicellular protists. The specific epithet litria comes from Ancient Greek ́τρον (litron), an alternative form of νίτρον (nitron), meaning sodium carbonate; the term was used by Herodotus to describe embalming salts used for mummification in Ancient Egypt, harvested from carbonate-rich soda lakes of the Natron Valley. The authors of the species chose the African-specific version of the Ancient Greek word to reflect the African type locality and the possible relevance of these alkaline lakes to local human culture and history.

== Description ==
Skoliomonads are flagellates, unicellular protists (a type of eukaryote) that use flagella for movement. Their cells are rounded at their anterior end and pointy at their posterior, with a flattened ventral side and a dorsal hump. The ventral side contains a major groove, which is characteristic of other basal eukaryotes such as excavates. The cells are asymmetrical: the left side of the cell contains the majority of the cytoplasm, including the nucleus and various large vacuoles for digestion, often containing bacteria which constitute their prey. The right side is occupied almost entirely by the right edge of the groove. The type isolate, TZLM3-RCL, has been observed forming complex cysts with two walls and a conspicuous plugged pore, something unique among metamonads.

Each cell has two flagella of different lengths, inserted sub-apically and facing the ventral side of the cell. A conspicuous "lip" structure extends from the flagellar insertion along the right side of the ventral groove to the base of the posterior pointy end. The anterior flagellum is around the same length as the cell, and it is pointed forward. The posterior flagellum is twice as long, and features a conspicuously broad flagellar vane around 1 μm wide along the length of the groove, directed away from the cell body.

The ventral groove curves gently to the right as it extends down the cell, and its posterior end has a large opening that gives way to a large cytopharynx underneath its right edge. The cytopharynx, supported by a robust intracellular structure, extends along the dorsal side toward the cell's anterior apex. This is unique to skoliomonads and barthelonids, since the cytopharynx of most known metamonads (Carpediemonas-like organisms) is short, discrete and points toward the left side of the cells. Skoliomonads are similar to most other metamonads in their big flagellar vane, which barthelonids lack.

== Ecology ==
Skoliomonads are anaerobe microorganisms that feed on bacteria. In particular, Skoliomonas litria is a haloalkaliphilic anaerobe, as it inhabits a hypersaline and alkaline soda lake.

== Taxonomy ==
- - - "barthelonids"
      - Barthelona isolates
    - "skoliomonads"
      - Skoliomonas sp. TZLM3-RCL (Tanzania)
      - - Skoliomonas sp. GEM-RC (Canada)
        - - Skoliomonas sp. Soap18-RC (USA)
          - Skoliomonas sp. Soap20A-RC (USA)
          - Skoliomonas litria TZLM1-RC (Tanzania)
  - Fornicata

Cladogram of skoliomonads based on a SSU rRNA phylogeny published in 2024.

The genus Skoliomonas was described by protistologists Yana Eglit and Alastair G.B. Simpson, from strains of metamonad flagellates isolated from alkaline hypersaline sediments found at various soda lakes: Lake Manyara in Tanzania, Goodenough Lake in British Columbia, Canada, and Soap Lake in Washington state, USA. The isolates were cultivated, observed under light microscopy and transmission electron microscopy, and genetically sequenced in order to discover their phylogenetic position. Following the results, the authors published in 2024 the description of this genus, along with its type and only species Skoliomonas litria.

In phylogenetic analyses using the SSU rRNA gene, a clade composed of Skoliomonas isolates, informally named "skoliomonads", is the sister group to barthelonids, which are in turn closely related to Fornicata within the phylum Metamonada.
