= Notopharyngea =

Scientific classification
- Domain: Eukaryota
- Clade: Metamonada
- Phylum: incertae sedis
- Class: Notopharyngea; Shiratori et al. 2026

Orders
- Barthelonida; Skoliomonadida

Synonyms
- BaSk Williams et al. 2024

Class of metamonads

The class Notopharyngea, formerly known as the BaSk clade, includes two orders of free-living anaerobic metamonads. It was identified by phylogenomic analyses as a deeply branching sister group to the Fornicata, and recently the rest of Metamonada. The extreme mitochondrial reduction observed within this free-living anaerobic protistan clade demonstrates that mitochondrial functions may be completely lost even in free-living organisms, not only parasites.
