= Letiny =

- Municipality
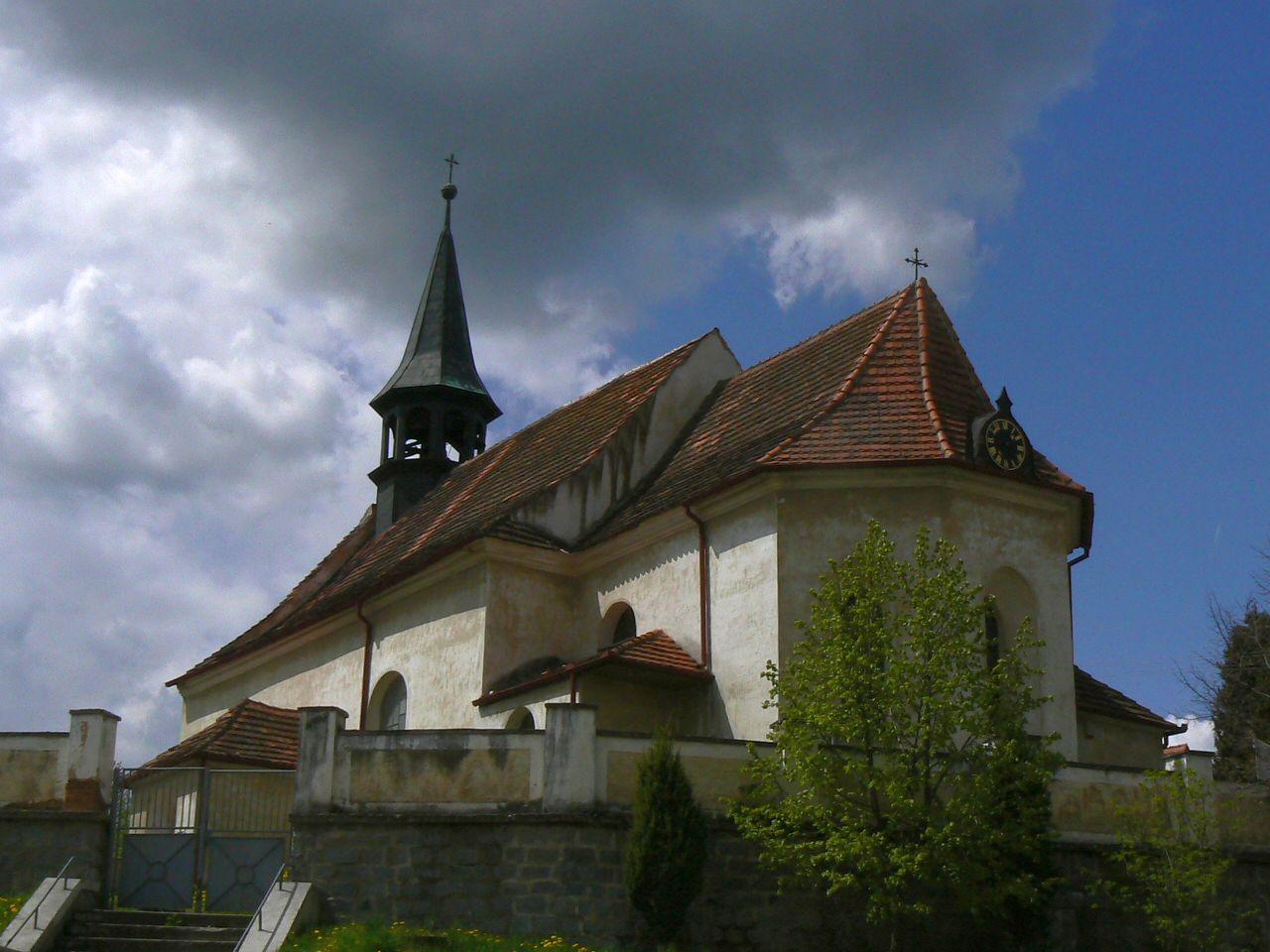
- Church of Saint Procopius

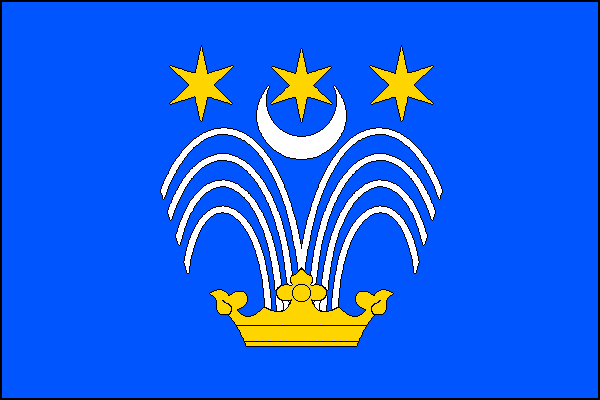
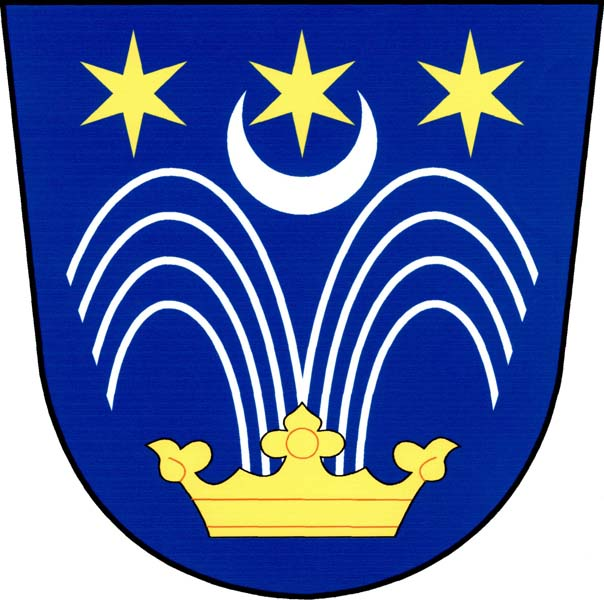
- Flag Coat of arms

- Location in the Czech Republic
- Coordinates: 49°32′24″N 13°27′19″E
- Country: Czech Republic
- Region: Plzeň
- District: Plzeň-South
- First mentioned: 1243

Area
  - Total: 19.31 km^{2} (7.46 sq mi)
- Elevation: 470 m (1,540 ft)

Population (2026-01-01)
  - Total: 713
  - Density: 36.9/km^{2} (95.6/sq mi)
- Time zone: UTC+1 (CET)
  - Summer (DST): UTC+2 (CEST)
- Postal code: 336 01
- Website: www.letiny.cz

Letiny is a municipality and village in Plzeň-South District in the Plzeň Region of the Czech Republic. It has about 700 inhabitants.

Letiny lies approximately 25 kilometres (16 mi) south of Plzeň and 93 km (58 mi) south-west of Prague.

== Administrative division ==
Letiny consists of five municipal parts (in brackets population according to the 2021 census):

- Letiny (506)
- Bzí (38)
- Chocenický Újezd (102)
- Kbelnice (88)
- Svárkov (59)

== Demographics ==
Historical population
Year	Pop.	±%
1869	1,278	—
1880	1,228	−3.9%
1890	1,140	−7.2%
1900	1,109	−2.7%
1910	1,183	+6.7%
1921	1,130	−4.5%
1930	1,064	−5.8%
1950	947	−11.0%
1961	873	−7.8%
1970	763	−12.6%
1980	688	−9.8%
1991	590	−14.2%
2001	576	−2.4%
2011	782	+35.8%
2021	793	+1.4%
Source: Censuses

== Notable people ==
- Vilém Dušan Lambl (1824–1895), medical doctor and author
