= Red-backed vole =

Red-backed vole can refer to members of the following genera, formerly in the genus Myodes:

- Clethrionomys
- Craseomys
