= Hexamita =

- Retortamonas (Retortamonadida), on left; Hexamita, on center, and Giardia, on right (both Diplomonadida)

Scientific classification
- Domain: Eukaryota
- Clade: Metamonada
- Phylum: Fornicata
- Class: Eopharyngea
- Order: Diplomonadida
- Family: Hexamitidae
- Subfamily: Hexamitinae
- Genus: Hexamita; Dujardin, 1838

Species
- Hexamita columbae; Hexamita meleagridis; Hexamita muris; Hexamita pitheci; Hexamita salmonis; Hexamita truttae

Genus of parasitic diplomonads

Hexamita is a genus of parasitic diplomonads. It is related to Giardia. H. columbae and H. meleagridis live in the intestines of birds. H. muris and H. pitheci live in the intestines of mammals. H. salmonis and H. truttae live in the intestines of fish. Species in the Hexamita family are most commonly spread through fecal matter.

The genus also includes the species Hexamita inflata.

It is believed that Hexamita parasites are one possible cause for head and lateral line erosion ("hole-in-the-head disease") in aquarium fishes.
