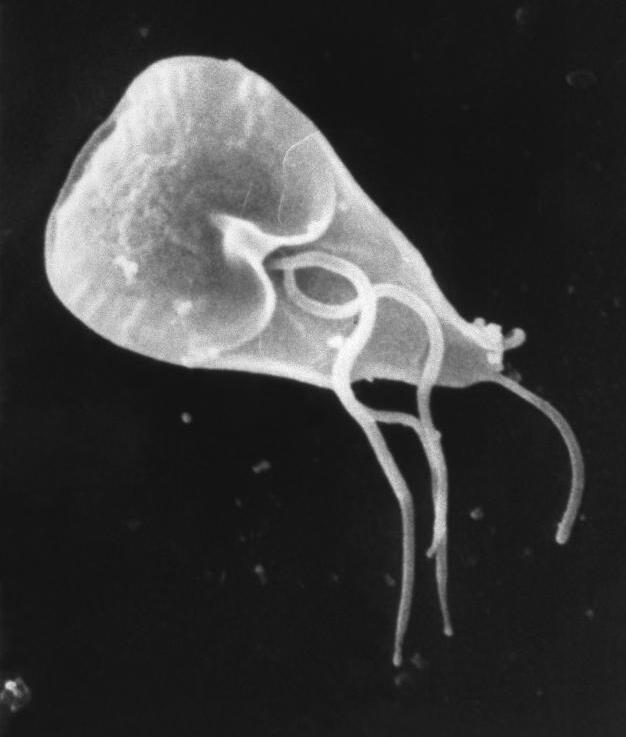
- Giardia duodenalis cell, SEM

Scientific classification
- Domain: Eukaryota
- Phylum: Fornicata
- Order: Diplomonadida
- Family: Hexamitidae
- Genus: Giardia
- Species: G. duodenalis

Binomial name
- Giardia duodenalis Stiles, 1902

Synonyms
- Cercomonas intestinalis Lambl, 1859; Lamblia intestinalis Blanchard, 1888; Giardia lamblia (Lambl, 1859) Kofoid & Christiansen, 1915; Giardia intestinalis Kulda & Nohýnková, 1995

= Giardia duodenalis =

Parasitic microorganism that causes giardiasis

Giardia duodenalis, also known as Giardia intestinalis and Giardia lamblia, is a flagellated parasitic protozoan microorganism of the genus Giardia that colonizes the small intestine, causing a diarrheal condition known as giardiasis. The parasite attaches to the intestinal epithelium by a ventral disc (syn. adhesive disc or sucker), and reproduces via binary fission. G. duodenalis is a non-invasive parasite, that does not spread to other parts of the gastrointestinal tract, but remains confined to the lumen of the small intestine. The parasite exists in two forms; trophozoites and cysts. The microorganism can undergo encystation, transforming into a dormant cyst that enables it to survive outside of its host. Giardia trophozoites are anaerobic, and absorb their nutrients from the intestinal lumen. If the organism is stained, its characteristic pattern resembles the familiar "smiley face" symbol.

Chief pathways of human infection include ingestion of untreated drinking water (which is the most common method of transmission for this parasite), food, soil contaminated with human feces, and sewage, a phenomenon particularly common in many developing countries. Contamination of natural waters also occurs in watersheds where intensive grazing occurs.

Giardia infections occur worldwide. It is the most commonly identified intestinal parasite among children in day-care centers, hikers and immunocompromised patients. About 20,000 cases per year in the United States are reported.

Almost half of those infected with giardiasis remain asymptomatic. For those who do experience symptoms, they usually appear 1 to 2 weeks after infection. Common symptoms include abdominal pain, nausea, and bloating, along with large, watery, foul-smelling, and greasy stools. Due to frequent loose stools, individuals with giardiasis often experience dehydration. It has also been shown that G. intestinalis damages the intestinal epithelium, which directly affects nutrient absorption. In severe cases, giardiasis can lead to chronic diarrhea, chronic fatigue syndrome and cognitive impairment in children.

== Life cycle ==
Lifecycle of Giardia lamblia

G. duodenalis takes on two morphologically distinct forms during its lifecycle. Trophozoites are the replicative stage of the parasite, characterized by a pear-shaped, motile, flagellated cell that survives only in the small intestine of the host. The trophozoites do not penetrate host cells, but rather attaches to the intestinal epithelium cells to establish an infection. A cyst is the environmentally stable stage of the parasite, that facilitates transmission between hosts.

The infection process in the host begins with the ingestion of cysts, which pass through the stomach into the first part of small intestine, or the duodenum. Exposure to digestive enzymes and an acidic pH triggers excystation, where the cysts release trophozoites. Trophozoites swim through the intestinal mucus until they eventually adhere to the intestinal epithelium using their ventral disc. Adhered trophozoites can then feed, divide by binary fission and cause the disease. Trophozoites cause structural and functional damage to the host epithelial cells, impairing the intestine's ability to absorb nutrients effectively. Some trophozoites differentiate back into cysts under specific conditions, such as high organism density. As the trophozoites travel through the intestinal lumen to the large intestine, the alkaline environment and the presence of pancreatic proteases trigger the encystation. Trophozoites develop into cysts through encystation, which involves specialized vesicles (ESVs) that facilitate the formation of the cyst wall.

Cysts and trophozoites pass through the host's large intestine and are shed in the feces. Trophozoites cannot survive outside of the host, whereas cysts can remain viable in the external environment for several months. The cysts remain dormant until ingested by a host animal. When a new potential host ingests water or food contaminated with this feces, the cysts gain entry to the gastrointestinal tract of the new host, repeating the cycle.

== Structure ==
The trophozoite has an elaborate structure with two nuclei and four pairs of flagella which allow it to swim within the intestinal lumen of the host. It also has an adhesive disk on its ventral surface that is associated with the parasite's attachment to the intestinal epithelium. The adhesive disk is composed of microtubules, and is found only in Giardia. The parasite lacks Golgi apparatus and mitochondria but has mitosomes, which probably evolved from mitochondria. The mitosome is a double-membraned organelle, that lacks the enzymatic components required for classic mitochondrial functions, such as ATP synthesis and lipid metabolism. However, they do contain certain mitochondrial genes associated with iron-sulfur complex biosynthesis, which suggests that this organism likely lost its mitochondria during evolution.

The cyst contains four nuclei, axonemes, median bodies as well as the rigid cyst wall. Additionally, the cysts contain fragments of the adhesive disc within the cytoplasm. The two-layered cyst wall protects the parasite against different environmental conditions such as chemical treatments. The metabolic activity of the cyst is significantly lower compared to that of the trophozoites, which allows the parasite to survive for longer periods in harsh conditions, such as in cold environments.

== Prevalence and epidemiology ==
G. duodenalis causes an infection called giardiasis. This disease is the cause of both endemic and epidemic disease worldwide and is the most frequently identified intestinal parasite in the United States and Canada. An infected individual can excrete between 1 million and 1 billion cysts daily, and the infectious dose can be as low as 10 cysts. This makes Giardia extremely infectious.

It is estimated to infect over 280 million people world every year resulting in over 500,000 deaths. The most affected demographic is children 0 to 4 years of age. Globally G. duodenalis is the most commonly identified protozoal intestinal parasite. Giardia has common seasonal patterns in the distribution of infection rates with highest peaks in the late summer to early fall.

The cyst can survive for weeks to months in cold water, so the parasite can be present in contaminated wells and water systems, especially in stagnant water sources, such as naturally occurring ponds, storm-water storage systems, and even clean-looking mountain streams. Cysts can also be found on contaminated surfaces, soil and food. They may also occur in city reservoirs and persist after water treatment, as the cysts are resistant to conventional water-treatment methods, such as chlorination and ozonolysis. Zoonotic transmission is also possible, but is less frequent. Giardia infection is a concern for people camping in the wilderness or swimming in contaminated streams or lakes, especially the artificial lakes formed by beaver dams (hence the popular name for giardiasis, "beaver fever").

In addition to waterborne sources, Giardia infections are more commonly found in children compared to adults, this is believed to be due to fecal-oral transmission of the cysts. For example, in developed countries it affects approximately 2% of adults and 8% of children. In developing countries the prevalence rates reach 15% to 20% in children under 10 years old. Thus, there is a significant variation in infection rates based on geographical area.

Those who work with children are also at risk of being infected, as are family members of infected individuals. 7% of children aged 1 to 3 years and 11% of infants and toddlers tested for admission to day-care centers were found to be infected. Not all Giardia infections are symptomatic, and many people can unknowingly serve as carriers of the parasite. Re-infection and chronic infections of the parasite can occur.

=== Geographical prevalence ===
G. duodenalis is the most widespread intestinal parasite affecting humans. The parasite Giardia duodenalis can be found all over the world, in both developing and industrialized nations. However, human infections are most common in tropical and subtropical climates. Giardia duodenalis is common around the world because the parasite resides in bodies of water; typically rivers, lakes, and recreational swimming pools. Giardiasis is more prevalent in developing countries, where the sanitation and overall hygiene is poorer compared to developed countries. In developed nations, giardiasis has a prevalence of 2–5%, whereas in developing nations it is significantly higher, ranging from 20% to 30%. In the United States, it has been discovered that a majority of whom are infected by the Giardia duodenalis parasite tend to reside in more urban areas, and, patients who are infected are more likely to live in the Southern United States.

== Ecology ==
Giardia infects humans, but is also one of the most common parasites infecting cats, dogs, and birds. Mammalian hosts also include dozens of species, including cattle, sheep, and goats.

Cats can be cured easily, and lambs usually simply lose weight, but in calves, the parasites can be fatal and often are not responsive to antibiotics or electrolytes. Carriers among calves can also be asymptomatic. This parasite is deadly for chinchillas, so extra care must be taken by providing them with safe water. Dogs have a high infection rate, as 30% of the population under one year old are known to be infected in kennels. The infection is more prevalent in puppies than in adult dogs. Infected dogs can be isolated and treated, or the entire pack at a kennel can be presumptively treated together. Kennels and areas used for exercise should be considered contaminated for at least one month after dogs show signs of infection, as cysts can survive in the environment for long periods of time. Prevention can be achieved by quarantine of infected dogs for at least 20 days and careful management and maintenance of a clean water supply.

== Cell biology ==
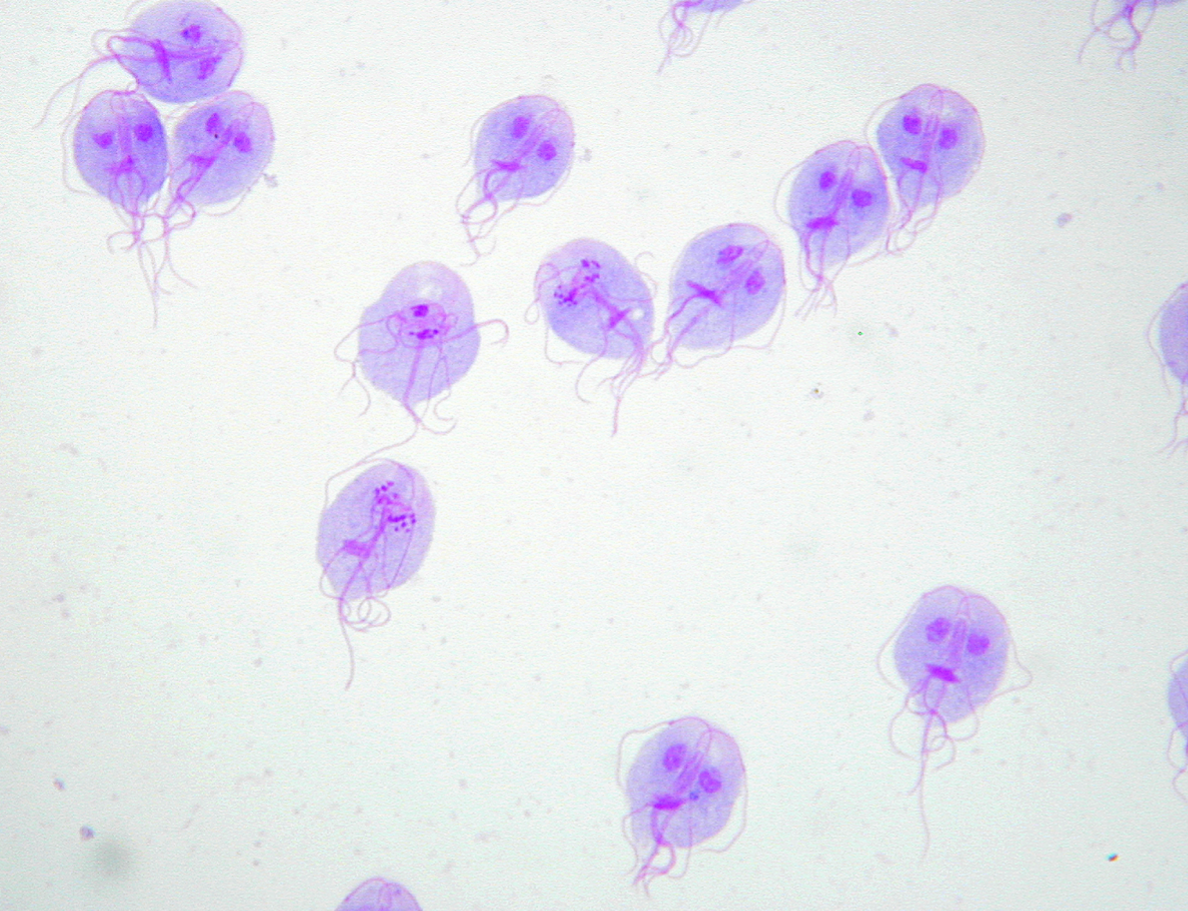
Giardia trophozoites stained with Giemsa; 100x magnification

G. duodenalis trophozoites are pear-shaped cells, 15 μm long, 8 μm across, and 3 μm thick. They are motile by way of four pairs of flagella, which propel the trophozoites through the intestine. Notably, each G. duodenalis cell has two nuclei, both of which actively transcribe genes. Adjacent to the nucleus, G. duodenalis cells have an endoplasmic reticulum that extends through much of the cell. Trophozoites about to differentiate into cysts also contain prominent vesicles termed encystation-specific vesicles that disappear once cyst wall construction begins. Unlike most other eukaryotes, G. duodenalis cells contain no visible mitochondria, but instead contains a substantially reduced metabolic organelle known as a mitosome. Additionally, cells appear to contain no Golgi bodies, and instead the secretory system consists entirely of the endoplasmic reticulum and numerous vesicles dispersed throughout the cell, termed peripheral vesicles. Peripheral vesicles are responsible both for taking up extracellular nutrients, and expelling waste outside the cell. Each cell also contains a pair of rigid structures called median bodies which make up part of the G. lamblia cytoskeleton. Trophozoites adhere to host epithelial cells via a specialized disk-shaped organelle called the ventral disk.

Cysts are oval-shaped cells slightly smaller than trophozoites. They lack flagella, and are covered by a smooth, clear cyst wall. Each cyst contains four nuclei and fragments of the ventral disc.

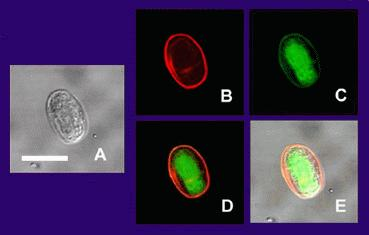
Multiple views of a G. lamblia cyst imaged by confocal microscopy: Bar = 10 micrometers (A) Cyst imaged by transmission (differential interference contrast) (B) Cyst wall selectively imaged through use of fluorescent-labelled antibody (C) Cyst imaged through use of carboxy fluorescein diacetate, a viability stain (D) Composite image of (B) and (C) (E) Composite image of (A), (B), and (C)

=== Metabolism ===
G. duodenalis primarily generates its energy by breaking down glucose via glycolysis, as well as the arginine deiminase pathway. It is unable to synthesize nucleotides on its own, instead salvaging them from its host. Synthesis of iron–sulfur clusters is done in a double-membrane-bound compartment called the mitosome, which is likely a remnant of mitochondria. Each cell contains 25 to 100 mitosomes divided into two categories - peripheral mitosomes, which are scattered throughout the cell, and central mitosomes, which gather at the center of the cell for unknown reasons. As in mitochondria, proteins with a certain peptide signal sequence are trafficked to and imported into the mitosome. Unlike mitochondria, mitosomes have no genome of their own. All mitosomal genes are encoded by the Giardia nuclear genome.

=== Genetics ===
Giardia and the other diplomonads are unique in their possession of two cell nuclei that are similar in appearance, DNA content, transcription, and time of replication. Giardia is a polyploid organism, with at least four, and perhaps eight or more, copies of each of five chromosomes per organism. The genome has been sequenced and was published in 2007, although the sequence contains several gaps. The sequence is about 12 million base pairs and contains about 5000 protein-coding genes. The GC-content is 46%. Trophozoites have a ploidy of four and the ploidy of cysts is eight, which in turn raises the question of how Giardia maintains homogeneity between the chromosomes of the same and opposite nuclei. Modern sequencing technologies have been used to resequence different strains. Eight genotype assemblages of G. duodenalis have been recognized to date (A-H). Genotyping of G. duodenalis isolated from various hosts has shown that assemblages A and B infect the largest range of host species, and appear to be the main assemblages that undeniably infect human subjects.

== Immunology ==
Infections with Giardia are self-limited in immunocompetent individuals, while people with immunodeficiency disorders may develop chronic giardiasis. During the infection different mechanisms from the innate and adaptive immune system are activated. The first physical barrier is the mucus layer where the organism interacts with epithelial, immune cells, and some antimicrobial peptides released by those cells as well as nitric oxide and inflammatory cytokines like interleukin 6. TLR2 and TLR4 also can be activated by Giardia. The T-cell response in giardiasis includes T helper cells and cytotoxic T cells, and the production of IgA by B cells also helps to eliminate the infection.

== Evolution ==
Giardia had been assumed to be primitively asexual and with no means of transferring DNA between nuclei. These assumptions made explaining the remarkably low level of allelic heterozygosity (< 0.01%) in the genome isolate, WB, very difficult, but all those assumptions of asexuality are now in doubt, with population genetics providing evidence for recombination and the identification of meiotic genes, evidence for recombination among isolates and the evidence for exchange of genetic material between nuclei during the process of encystation.

These findings on sexuality in Giardia, above, have important implications for understanding the origin of sexual reproduction in eukaryotes. Though sexual reproduction is widespread among extant eukaryotes, until recently, sex seemed unlikely to be a primordial and fundamental feature of eukaryotes. A probable reason for the view that sex may not be fundamental to eukaryotes was that sexual reproduction previously appeared to be lacking in certain human pathogenic single-celled eukaryotes (e.g. Giardia) that diverged from early ancestors in the eukaryotic lineage.

In addition to the evidence cited above for recombination in Giardia, Malik et al. reported that many meiosis specific genes occur in the Giardia genome, and further that homologs of these genes also occur in another unicellular eukaryote, Trichomonas vaginalis. Because these two species are descendants of lineages that are highly divergent among eukaryotes, Malik et al. suggested that these meiotic genes were present in a common ancestor of all eukaryotes. Thus, on this view, the earliest ancestor of eukaryotes was likely capable of sexual reproduction. Furthermore, Dacks and Roger proposed, based on phylogenetic analysis, that facultative sex was present in the common ancestor of all eukaryotes. Bernstein et al. also reviewed evidence in support of this view.

== Research ==
Frances Gillin of the University of California, San Diego, and her colleagues cultivated the entire lifecycle of this parasite in the laboratory, and identified biochemical cues in the host's digestive system that trigger Giardia's lifecycle transformations. They also uncovered several ways in which the parasite evades the defenses of the infected organism. One of these is by altering the proteins on its surface, which confounds the ability of the infected animal's immune system to detect and combat the parasite (called antigenic variation). Gillin's work reveals why Giardia infections are extremely persistent and prone to recur. In addition, these insights into its biology and survival techniques may enable scientists to develop better strategies to understand, prevent, and treat Giardia infections.

In December 2008, Nature published an article showing the discovery of an RNA interference mechanism that allows Giardia to switch variant-specific surface proteins to avoid host immune response. The discovery was made by the team working at the Biochemistry and Molecular Biology Laboratory, School of Medicine, Catholic University of Cordoba, Argentina, led by Dr. Hugo Lujan.

In 2022, a study conducted by Elisa Barroeta-Echegaray and colleagues concluded that Giardia duodenalis secretes enolase as a monomer during the interaction, or attachment, of trophozoites with intestinal epithelial cells. This interaction was shown to activate plasminogen and induce necroptotic damage in intestinal epithelial cells. Blocking the enolase inhibited trophozoite attachment to intestinal epithelial cells. Enolase was also shown to enhance plasmin activity, leading to significant cell damage characterized by vacuolization and intercellular separation. Enolase also induced necroptosis in epithelial cells via tumor necrosis factor α (TNF-α) and apoptosis-inducing factor (AIF), independent of caspase-3 activity. These findings suggest that Giardia enolase is a critical virulence factor in host-pathogen interactions.

Since 2022, the CRISPR-Cas9 system was established in Giardia. Constitutively expressed Cas9 nuclease in combination with a cassette bearing the recombining knock-out construct, allows to knock out all four alleles of interest in the trophozoite stage in vitro. Complementation and protein tagging are also available to study protein localization and function in Giardia. Making cysts in vitro is also possible, for example using the Uppsala encystation protocol. Excystation in vitro is also possible, although viable trophozoite numbers are quite low after excystation in vitro.

The main congress about Giardia is the International Giardia and Cryptosporidium Conference. A summary of results presented at the most recent editions (2019, in Rouen, France and 2025, in Melbourne, Australia) are available.

== History ==
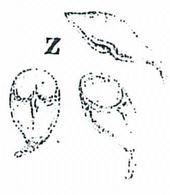
A Giardia trophozoite, drawn by Vilém Lambl and published in 1859

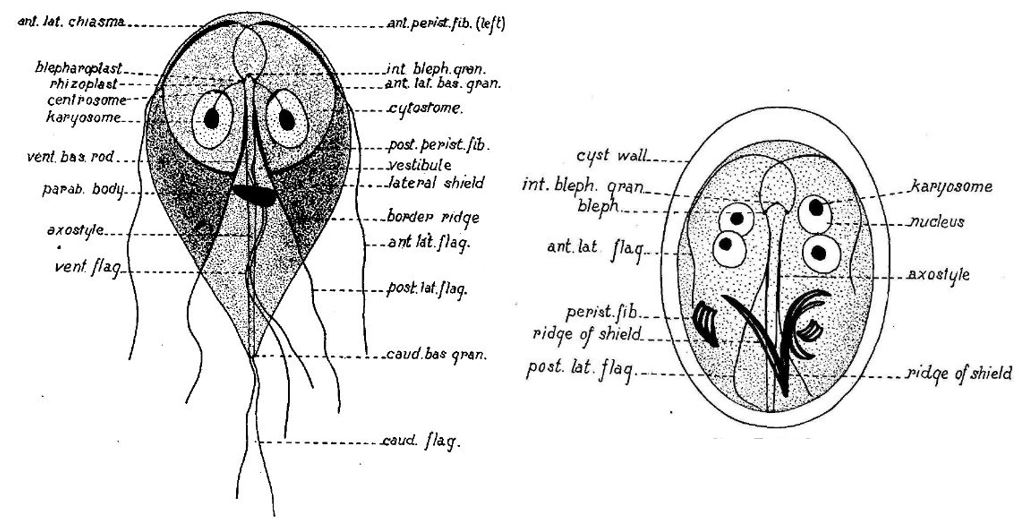
Drawings of a Giardia trophozoite and cyst by Charles E. Simon in 1921

The first likely description of Giardia was in 1681 by Antonie van Leeuwenhoek, who in a letter to Robert Hooke, described "animalcules" resembling Giardia trophozoites in his stool. The next known description of Giardia wasn't until 1859, when Czech medical doctor Vilém Dušan Lambl published a description of the trophozoite stages he saw in the stool of a pediatric patient. Lambl termed the organism Cercomonas intestinalis. In 1888, Raphaël Blanchard renamed the parasite Lamblia intestinalis in Lambl's honor. In 1915, Charles Stiles renamed the organism Giardia lamblia in honor of both Lambl and Professor Alfred Mathieu Giard of Paris. In 1921, Charles E. Simon published a detailed description of the parasite's morphology.

In the 21st century, many detection, diagnostics and characterization tools have been established for Giardia that contributed to knowledge regarding its systematics, metabolism and reproduction. By 2025, several genomes of G. duodenalis isolates (from A, B and E subspecies) have been whole-genome sequenced using long-read sequencing and compared, improving understanding of Giardia phylogeny and genetics.

== See also ==
- List of parasites of humans
