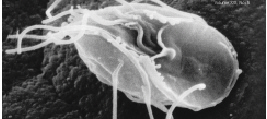
- Giardia lamblia

Scientific classification
- Domain: Eukaryota
- (unranked): incertae sedis
- Phylum: Fornicata
- Order: Diplomonadida; Klebs, 1892
- Family: Hexamitidae; Kent, 1881

Subfamilies
- Hexamitinae; Giardiinae

Synonyms
- Diplozoa Dangeard, 1910

= Diplomonad =

Group of mostly parasitic flagellates

The diplomonads (Greek for "two units") are a group of flagellates, most of which are parasitic. They include Giardia duodenalis, which causes giardiasis in humans. They are placed among the metamonads, and appear to be particularly close relatives of the retortamonads.

== Morphology ==
Most diplomonads are double cells: they have two nuclei, each with several associated flagella, arranged symmetrically about the body's main axis. Like the retortamonads, they lack both mitochondria and Golgi apparatuses. However, they are now known to possess modified mitochondria, in the case of G. duodenalis, called mitosomes. These are not used in ATP synthesis the way mitochondria are, but are involved in the maturation of iron-sulfur proteins.

Representation of a diplomonad: 1. Anterior flagellum; 2. Basal body; 3. Nucleus; 4. Nucleolus; 5. Recurrent flagellum; 6. Endoplasmic reticulum, the transport network for molecules going to specific parts of the cell; 7. Cytopharynx, works with the cytostome to import macromolecules; 8. Infranuclear microtubules; 9. Cytostomal fibre microtubules; 10. Mitosome, related to mitochondria; 11. Digestive Vacuole; 12. Granule; 13. Endosome, sorts material; 14. Cytostome, cell mouth

== Reproduction peculiarities ==
The extent of sexual reproduction among distinct diplomonad species is under intense research.

For example, the common intestinal parasite Giardia duodenalis (syn. G. lamblia, G. intestinalis) was once considered to be a descendant of a protist lineage that predated the emergence of meiosis and biological sex. However, with the advancements in sequencing and omics techniques, and the axenization of various Giardia isolates, it became evident that giardias do not utilize exclusively an asexual (clonal) mode of reproduction.

Firstly, a set of genes that function in meiosis and are widely present among sexual eukaryotes was found in the Giardia genome. Presence of the homologous recombination (or template-dependent recombination) machinery genes signifies a possibility of homologous recombination during reproductive cycle. Secondly, G. duodenalis possesses two functionally equivalent nuclei that are inherited independently during trophozoite fission. In the giardia cyst (which contains 4 nuclei), the nuclei temporarily fuse and DNA may undergo homologous recombination facilitated by meiosis gene homologs. This process is similar to karyogamy, but in the case of diplomonads it is termed diplomixis and signifies a temporary nuclear fusion (junction) and genetic material exchange.

Several researchers have found diplomixis evidence in Giardia. For example, Cooper et al. found direct evidence of infrequent meiotic recombination, indicative of sexual reproduction between individuals of G. duodenalis AII genotype isolates. Ankarklev and Lasek-Nesselquist and colleagues also detected molecular signatures consistent with meiotic sex between different Giardia genotypes. Xu et al. found that recombination between individuals from different assemblages is occurring, though very rarely. In summary, recent findings suggest that recombination occurs between distant Giardia isolates (from different genotypes, e.g. A & B, A & E) and between individuals of AII genotype, which are probably more apt to utilize homologous recombination during their reproductive cycle.
