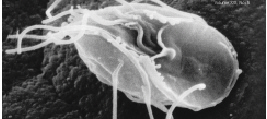
- Giardia lamblia, a parasitic diplomonad

Scientific classification
- Domain: Eukaryota
- Supergroup: Metamonada; Grassé 1952 emend. Cavalier-Smith 2003

Phyla and incertae sedis
- Fornicata; Parabasalia; Preaxostyla (=Anaeromonadea); Anaeramoebae; Incertae sedis; Notopharyngea (=BaSk)

Synonyms
- Archezoa Cavalier-Smith 1983 stat. n. emend. Cavalier-Smith 2022; Centrosomea Chatton Villeneuve 1937; Metamonadina Grassé 1952; Polymastigota Butschli 1884; Tetramastigota Hulsmann & Hausmann 1994

= Metamonad =

Clade of excavate protists

The metamonads are a large group of flagellate amitochondriate microscopic eukaryotes. They include the retortamonads, diplomonads, parabasalids, oxymonads, and a range of more poorly studied taxa, most of which are free-living flagellates. All metamonads are anaerobic (many being aerotolerant anaerobes), and most members of the four groups listed above are symbiotes or parasites of animals, as is the case with Giardia lamblia which causes diarrhea in mammals.

== Characteristics ==
A number of parabasalids and oxymonads are found in termite guts, and play an important role in breaking down the cellulose found in wood. Some other metamonads are parasites.

These flagellates are unusual in lacking aerobic mitochondria. Originally they were considered among the most primitive eukaryotes, diverging from the others before mitochondria appeared. However, they are now known to have lost aerobic mitochondria secondarily, and retain both organelles and nuclear genes derived ultimately from the mitochondrial endosymbiont genome. Mitochondrial relics include hydrogenosomes, which produce hydrogen (and make ATP), and small structures called mitosomes.

It now appears the Metamonada are, together with Malawimonas, sister clades of the Podiata.

All of these groups have flagella or basal bodies in characteristic groups of four (or more, in parabasalids), which are often associated with the nucleus, forming a structure called a karyomastigont. In addition, genera such as Carpediemonas and Trimastix are now known to be close relatives of the retortamonad-diplomonad lineage and the oxymonads, respectively. Most of the closer relatives of the retortamonad-diplomonad lineage actually have two flagella and basal bodies.

== Classification ==
The metamonads were thought to make up part of the Excavata, a proposed eukaryotic supergroup including flagellates with feeding grooves and their close relatives. Their relationships are uncertain, and they do not always appear together on molecular trees. Current opinion is that Excavata is not a monophyletic group, but it might be paraphyletic.

Metamonada were once again proposed to be basal eukaryotes in 2018.

A view of the metamonad taxonomy is:

- Clade Metamonada
  - Phylum Fornicata
    - Order Diplomonadida
      - Family Hexamitidae
        - Subfamily Hexamitinae
        - Subfamily Giardiinae
    - Order Retortamonadida (paraphyletic)
      - Family Retortamonadidae (paraphyletic)
    - Family Caviomonadidae
    - Informal group Carpediemonas-like organisms (polyphyletic)
      - Order Dysnectida
        - Family Dysnectidae
      - Family Kipferliidae
      - Genus Aduncisulcus
      - Genus Carpediemonas
      - Genus Ergobibamus
      - Genus Hicanonectes
  - Phylum Parabasalia
    - Class Hypotrichomonadea
      - Order Hypotrichomonadida
        - Family Hypotrichomonadidae
    - Class Pimpavickea
      - Order Pimpavickida
        - Family Pimpavickidae
    - Class Trichomonadea
      - Order Honigbergiellida
        - Family Hexamastigidae
        - Family Honigbergiellidae
        - Family Cthulhuidae
        - Family Tetratrichomastigidae
      - Order Trichomonadida
        - Family Lacusteriidae
        - Family Trichomonadidae
        - Family Incertae sedis
          - Genus Pseudotrichomonas
          - Genus †Paleotrichomones
    - Clade Tla
      - Class Lophomonadea
        - Order Lophomonadida
          - Family Lophomonadidae
      - Class Trichonymphea
        - Order Trichonymphida
          - Family Barbulanymphidae
          - Family Hoplonymphidae
          - Family Retractinymphidae
          - Family Spirotrichosomidae
          - Family Staurojoeninidae
          - Family Teranymphidae
          - Family Trichonymphidae
          - Family †Burmanymphidae
    - Clade Cadamassta
      - Class Cristamonadea
        - Order Calonymphida
          - Family Calonymphidae
          - Family Deltotrichonymphidae
          - Family Mixotrichidae
        - Order Devescovinida
          - Family Devescovinidae
        - Order Gigantomonadida
          - Family Gigantomonadidae
        - Order Incertae sedis
          - Genus Cyclojoenia
          - Genus Joenia
          - Genus Joenina
          - Genus Joenoides
          - Genus Joenopsis
          - Genus Pachyjoenia
          - Genus Parajoenopsis
          - Genus Placojoenia
          - Genus Projoenia
      - Class Dientamoebea
        - Order Dientamoebida
          - Family Dientamoebidae
      - Class Monocercomonadea
        - Order Monocercomonadida
          - Family Monocercomonadidae
      - Class Simplicimonadea
        - Order Simplicimonadida
          - Family Simplicimonadidae
      - Class Tritrichomonadea
        - Order Tritrichomonadida
          - Family Tritrichomonadidae
      - Class Spirotrichonymphea
        - Order Cononymphida
          - Family Cononymphidae
        - Order Holomastigotoidida
          - Family Holomastigotoididae
        - Order Spirotrichonymphida
          - Family Brugerollinidae
          - Family Fraterculidae
          - Family Holomastigotidae
          - Family Spirotrichonymphidae
    - Class Incertae sedis
      - Genus Chilomitus
      - Genus Rhizonympha
      - Genus Tricercomitus
      - Genus Trichocovina
  - Phylum Preaxostyla
    - Order Oxymonadida
      - Family Oxymonadidae
      - Family Pyrsonymphidae
      - Family Streblomastigidae
      - Family Saccinobaculidae
      - Family Polymastigidae
    - Order Trimastigida
      - Family Trimastigidae
    - Order Paratrimastigida
      - Family Paratrimastigidae
  - Phylum Anaeramoebae
    - Family Anaeramoebidae
  - Phylum Incertae sedis
    - Class Notopharyngea
      - Order Barthelonida
        - Family Barthelonidae
      - Order Skoliomonadida
        - Family Skoliomonadidae

== Evolution ==
Within Metamonada, two main branches are recovered in recent phylogenetic analyses. One branch contains the Parabasalia and the closely related anaeramoebae. The other branch contains two large groups: the Fornicata, which is closely related to barthelonids and the recently isolated Skoliomonas; and the Preaxostyla.

Early descriptions of several anaerobic protists as “amitochondriate” were interpreted as evidence that these organisms had diverged before mitochondrial acquisition, forming the basis of the now-rejected Archezoa hypothesis. Phylogenetic analyses provided independent evidence against this interpretation: nuclear gene phylogenies indicated that Giardia and Trichomonas had secondarily lost canonical mitochondria rather than diverging before mitochondrial acquisition, while later phylogenomic analyses placed Metamonada within the broader excavate radiation. Subsequent identification of mitochondrial-derived proteins and, in several lineages, double-membrane-bound mitochondrial remnants demonstrated that their apparent lack of mitochondria represented secondary reductive evolution, not a primitive cellular condition.
