= Cochlosoma =

Scientific classification
- Domain: Eukaryota
- Supergroup: Metamonada
- Phylum: Parabasalia
- Class: Trichomonadea
- Order: Trichomonadida
- Family: Trichomonadidae
- Genus: Cochlosoma; Kotlán, 1923

Genus of flagellated protozoa

Cochlosoma is a genus of flagellated protozoa in the order Trichomonadida created by A. Kotlán (1923). Some of their typical features include a prominent adhesive disc, axostyle, costa, and six flagella – one of which is attached to an undulating membrane that runs laterally along the body.

Cochlosoma species are parasites found in the intestines of birds and mammals. They are known to cause runting and enteritis in young turkey and ducks.

The genus currently contains five species, the most notable member being C. anatis, a parasite of ducks and turkeys.

== History of knowledge ==
Cochlosoma was first described by Kotlán (1923) to include C. anatis, a flagellate he found in the intestines of young European domestic ducks (Anas platyrhynchos) suffering from coccidiosis. Cochlosoma rostratum was identified in North American domestic ducks by Kimura in 1934, although this species is now recognized as a synonym of C.anatis.

Kimura was the first to describe the morphology of Cochlosoma in great detail. A second species was described under the name Cyanthosoma striatum (Tyzzer, 1930) and was reassigned as Cochlosoma striatum by Kulda and Nohýnková (1978). In 1938, Bernard V. Travis described two new species of Cochlosoma, C. picae and C. turdi. The most recent addition to genus Cochlosoma is C. soricis, which was found in shrews by Watkins et al. (1989).

Cochlosoma was originally proposed to be part of diplomonads because their prominent adhesive disc is similar to that of Giardia. In 1952, Grassé placed the genus into the order Retortamonadida. However, morphological and ultrastructural observations (i.e. parabasal apparatus, pelta, costa, and axostyle) suggest the genus is more likely related to trichomonads and in 1996, Pecka et al. moved Cochlosoma to order Trichomonadida. More recently, analysis of their rRNA gene sequence further supported their placement in Trichomonadida and led to their transfer from family Cochlosomatidae to family Trichomonadidae.

== Hosts ==
Cochlosoma species are parasitic and commonly found in the cloaca, large intestine, and ceca. The following are some species and their known hosts:

- C. anatis: reported in ducks and turkeys and has been experimentally transmitted to chickens
- C. picae: American magpie (Pica hudsonia)
- C. turdi: American robin (Turdus migratorius)
- C. striatum: ruffled grouse (Bonasa umbelus)
- C. sorecis: Shrews
- Cochlosoma sp.: American magpies, eastern robins, bobwhite quail, songbirds, waterfowl, blue-faced parrot-finch, zebra finch, painted finch, nutmeg manikin, double-barred finch, red-headed parrot-finches, Bengalese finches, Lady Gould finches, and bats

== Morphology ==
Cochlosoma species have asymmetrical ovoidal shaped bodies (6-18 μm) that are broader anteriorly and narrower posteriorly. Their anterior end is truncated by a spiraled adhesive disc that is used to attach to the intestinal mucosa of the host. A lateral groove develops along the side of the body from the disc.

Six flagella of varying lengths arise from the anterior end of the cell. A recurrent flagellum is attached to the cell body by an undulating membrane and is free at the posterior end. The undulating membrane travels along the lateral groove and is supported by a conspicuous costa with type B periodicity. Four flagella are free and emerge anterolaterally from the lateral groove. The sixth flagellum emerges from a basal body the dorsal side of the body, independent of the basal body complex of the other flagella. Fibrillar appendages arise from the basal bodies. An axostyle also originates near the anterior basal bodies, passes through the body of the cell, and protrudes posteriorly.

They are uninucleate and their nucleus can range from spherical to slightly oblong. The nucleus is situated near the centre of the body. A parabasal apparatus, composed of a golgi complex and a single parabasal fiber, can be found near the anterior side of the nucleus. Double membrane bound organelles similar to hydrogenosomes are present in the cytoplasm. Cochlosoma species are often distinguished by their differences in size and the presence or absence of cytoplasmic granules.

== Life cycle ==
Little is known about Cochlosoma life cycles and much of what is known has been observed in C. anatis. Reproduction occurs by longitudinal binary fission in the trophozite stage. A pseudocyst stage has been recorded and may be the form taken during transmission via the fecal-oral route.

== Practical importance ==
Infection of Cochlosoma species has also been associated with runting and catarrhal enteritis in wild and domestic turkey poults and ducklings. Most observed cases of infection in adult finches are subclinical.

Cochlosoma attach themselves onto the host via suction which leaves microscopic lesions and swelling on the surface epithelium. Although there are many cases in which Cochlosoma species have been found to be the main pathogen, they are often found in conjunction with Coccidia, Salmonella, and Hexamita. The most notable case directly associated with Cochlosoma occurred in Scotland in 1945 when an outbreak resulted in severe enteritis and high mortality rates in turkey poults. Large numbers of Cochlosoma were found in the duodenum and jejunum of the birds.

Outbreaks of Cochlosoma can be prevented by reducing overcrowding and environmental contamination. Infection can be effectively treated with metronidazole or ronidazole.

== List of species ==
Genus Cochlosoma currently includes 5 species:

- Cochlosoma anatis Kotlan, 1925
- Cochlosoma striatum Tyzzer, 1930
- Cochlosoma picae Travis, 1938
- Cochlosoma turdi Travis, 1938
- Cochlosoma sorecis Watkins, O'Dell, & Pinter 1989
