= Tritrichomonas blagburni =

Species of eukaryote

Tritrichomonas blagburni is a genus of parasite that infects the digestive system of cats.

Tritrichomonas blagburni is a single-celled eukaryote that moves with whip-like flagella located on the exterior of its cell membrane. It is transmitted between cattle through sexual activity and infects their reproductive tracts. In cats, it infects the digestive tract, causing chronic diarrhea, tenesmus, flatulence, and fecal incontinence. It is only the second species described in the reproductive tract of cattle and the intestine of cats.

T. blagburni, named after Dr. Byron Blagburn, was discovered in experimental cross-infection studies between feline and bovine trichomonad isolates and their respective hosts. Cattle inoculated with the feline trichomonad isolate were able to maintain the parasite, but they did not develop the level of disease associated with bovine trichomonad isolate infections. Similar results were found in cats: Bovine trichomonad isolates did not cause the severe bowel disease associated with feline trichomoniasis, and it was more difficult to establish infection in cats with the bovine isolate than with the feline trichomonad isolate.

== Disease ==
Trichomoniasis, found in cattle and cats, is caused by both T. fetus and T. blagburni. In cats, it infects the digestive tract, causing chronic disease and large bowel diarrhea. Infected cattle show signs of pyometra and mid- to late-term abortions.

== Treatment ==
Complete eradication of the parasite continues to be sought. However, antiprotozoal agents, such as ronidazole or metronidazole, are known to dramatically reduce symptoms in cats. Research has found that cats left untreated will have 88% of their symptoms cease after two years.
