= Tetratrichomonas undula =

Scientific classification
- Domain: Eukaryota
- (unranked): incertae sedis
- Clade: Metamonada
- Phylum: Parabasalia
- Class: Trichomonadea
- Order: Trichomonadida
- Family: Trichomonadidae
- Genus: Tetratrichomonas
- Species: T. undula

Binomial name
- Tetratrichomonas undula Cepicka, Hampl & Kulda, 2010

Species of parabasalid

Tetratrichomonas undula is a species of parabasalid.
