= Tetratrichomonas =

Scientific classification
- Domain: Eukaryota
- (unranked): incertae sedis
- Clade: Metamonada
- Phylum: Parabasalia
- Class: Trichomonadea
- Order: Trichomonadida
- Family: Trichomonadidae
- Genus: Tetratrichomonas; Parisi, 1910

Genus of protists

Tetratrichomonas is a genus of metamonads.

Species:

- Tetratrichomonas brumpti
- Tetratrichomonas buttreyi
- Tetratrichomonas gallinarum
- Tetratrichomonas limacis
- Tetratrichomonas prowazeki
- Tetratrichomonas undula
