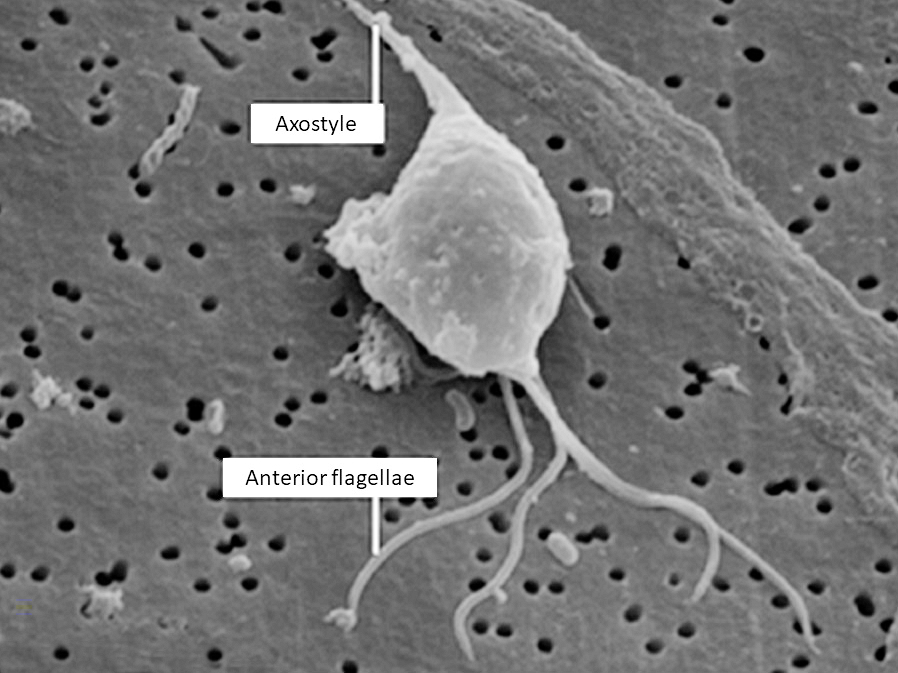
- Scanning electron micrograph of Trichomonas gallinae. Arrows indicate anterior flagella and axostyle.

Scientific classification
- Domain: Eukaryota
- Clade: incertae sedis
- Clade: Metamonada
- Phylum: Parabasalia
- Class: Trichomonadea
- Order: Trichomonadida
- Family: Trichomonadidae
- Genus: Trichomonas
- Species: T. gallinae

Binomial name
- Trichomonas gallinae (Rivolta, 1878)

= Trichomonas gallinae =

Species of bird parasite

Trichomonas gallinae is a cosmopolitan parasite of birds including finches, pigeons, doves, turkeys, chickens, parrots, and raptors (hawks, golden eagle, etc.). The condition in birds of prey is called frounce. It is believed to be an ancient pathogen causing frounce-like symptoms in theropod dinosaurs. The same condition in pigeons is commonly called canker.

The protozoa are small (5 to 20 μm size) oval or spherical flagellates with four free flagella found on the anterior aspect of the parasite. They also have an axostyle found on the posterior end as well as an undulating membrane on one side. An important microbiological diagnostic feature is the lack of a free posterior flagellum.

== Life cycle ==
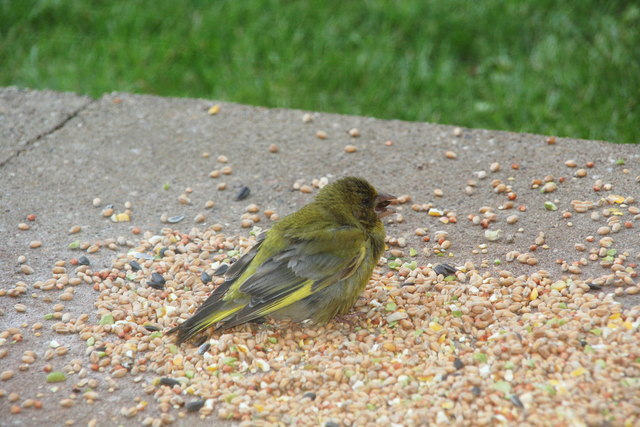
Greenfinch suffering 'fat finch disease' caused by Trichomonas gallinae.

T. gallinae is found in a motile trophozoite and nonmotile pseudocyst stage. It is generally found in the oral-nasal cavity or anterior end of the digestive and respiratory tracts. The trichomonads multiply rapidly by simple division (binary fission), but do not form a resistant cyst. They therefore die quickly when passed out of the host.

== Transmission ==
Pathogen transmission of the parasite from one bird to another occurs in one of three ways:

1. Infected parent feeding young
2. Contaminated drinking water
3. Infected bird is a prey meal for another bird (raptors most commonly)

In 2005, Trichomonas gallinae was first recognized as a cause of disease in British finches, with greenfinch and chaffinch most affected, although a range of garden birds have been found to be susceptible to the parasite. An outbreak in 2017 in Northern France concerned two species, the greenfinch and the goldfinch. Studies have shown that up to a third of adult wood pigeons in Spain may carry the disease.

In pigeons, transmission occurs when infected older birds (carriers) feed crop milk to newly hatched squabs. Adult birds, which may not show signs of disease, may carry the infection for a year or more and are a constant source of infection for their young.

Turkeys and chickens can become infected through drinking water or food contaminated with feces, saliva or crop secretions. Because the trichomonads do not survive for long outside the bird, transmission must occur rapidly. Newly introduced, unquarantined birds, as well as wild birds may be an important source of introducing the infection to domestic birds and vice versa.

The third method of transmission is more common to birds of prey. An infection may be established in a raptor that has fed on an infected prey bird.

== Pathology ==
Avian trichomoniasis is principally a disease of young birds. T. gallinae varies greatly in its virulence. The severity of the disease depends on the susceptibility of the bird and on the pathogenic potential of the strain of the parasite. Adult birds that recover from the infection may still carry the parasite, but are resistant to reinfection. These birds do not show obvious signs of infection. Infection and mortality rates are not closely linked. The disease varies from a mild condition to a rapidly fatal one with death in 4–18 days post infection.

In young birds, the early lesions appear as small white to yellowish areas in the mouth cavity, especially the soft palate. The lesions consist of inflammation and ulceration of the mucosal surface. The lesions increase in size and number and extend to the esophagus, crop and proventriculus. The lesions may develop into large, firm necrotic masses that may block the gastrointestinal or, more rarely, respiratory lumen. Occasionally, the disease may spread by penetrating the underlying tissues to involve the liver and other organs.

The early lesions in the mouth are small, yellowish, circumscribed plaques on the mucosa. More velogenic (highly virulent) strains can cause caseated abscessation of the oropharynx. Eventually these space occupying lesions obstruct the esophagus and trachea resulting in emaciation and asphyxiation.

Although lesions are usually seen in the mouth and oropharynx in raptors, it can also affect other mucous membranes. Jessup reports one owl having eye lesions from infection spreading into the nasolacrimal duct. Bony involvement can occur after soft tissue destruction. The organism does not survive posterior to the proventriculus, except in pigeons. Unlike other birds infected with T. gallinae, pigeons are susceptible to secondary organ invasion by virulent strains of the parasite. The visceral form of the disease involves the liver and gastrointestinal tract, causing organ dysfunction.

When observed under a light microscope, samples can be seen rapidly moving in a circular jerky motion. They will appear to be small, translucent flagellates as individuals or in clusters. The undulating membrane may appear to exhibit wave-like motions when higher magnification is used.

== Clinical signs ==
In acute cases, there may be little indication that the bird is infected, and death may occur quite suddenly. In other cases, infected birds may stop feeding, lose weight, look ruffled and dull, and be unable to stand or maintain their balance. Erosion of the papillae on the palatal flaps is a good sign of infection. White, sticky plaques may form yellow, necrotic, cheese-like masses on the choana, tongue, or pharyngeal mucosa; there may also be moisture around the beak as well as a foul odor coming from the affected area. Birds may have difficulty swallowing and breathing due to the cheese-like deposits in the mouth lining and down the esophagus and trachea.

Diarrhea may also occur. Death may occur within three weeks of infection. Greenish fluid or cheesy material may accumulate in the mouth and crop, and this material may exude from the beak. A pendulous crop may develop in turkey poults and chickens.

== Diagnosis ==
Diagnosis can be accomplished by clinical signs and direct exam or culture. Clinical signs of trichomoniasis include pronounced swallowing motions, excessive salivation and caseous-diphtheritic membranes of the mouth, crop and pharynx. Characteristic yellowish-white nodules in the oral cavity, esophagus and crop strongly suggest trichomoniasis. The infection is confirmed by finding the organism during microscopic examination of the greenish fluids, cheesy material or the lesion. Giemsa staining may aid in identifying the flagellate.

T. gallinae can be diagnosed by microscopic examination of a saline wet mount of oral excretions. The presence of a pear-shaped parasite with flagella is diagnostic. In psittacine birds, particularly in the early stages of infection, organisms often are not present on wet mounts of oral excretions.

== Treatment ==
Metronidazole is the treatment of choice. Treatment usually is successful after 1–2 days with early diagnosis. A new culture system called InPouch has practical advantages over the usual in vitro system. There is a risk of uncontrolled bleeding if oral plaques are removed by forceps, holding open the beak can also suffocate the bird.

== Prevention ==
Trichomoniasis can be controlled in a commercial/domestic flock by culling or treating carrier birds. Food and water sources, as well as bird baths, should be cleaned regularly and protected from contamination by wild birds.

Generally parasitic trichomonads cannot survive drying out. Cleaning feeders and bird baths and leaving them dry for a week may help in decreasing spread of disease although natural infections probably occur in the wider environment. Some related trichomonads do form cysts resistant to drying.

Bird diseases such as trichomoniasis rarely, if ever, affect people; but it is sensible to take care when handling bird feeders by good hand washing after tending the feeders, or wearing suitable disposable gloves. From the sources used, there have been no reports of Trichomonas gallinae infecting humans.

== Distribution ==
T. gallinae is found all over the world except in Antarctica, Greenland, and the northern parts of North America, Europe, and Asia.

== See also ==
- Trichomonas vaginalis is a related pathogen of humans
