= Frounce =

Frounce may refer to:

- Ruffle clothing.
- Trichomonas gallinae is a protist (or protozoan) that causes disease particularly in pigeons and doves. When it infects raptors the disease is called "frounce".
- Trichomonas an ancient group of disease-causing parasites in a wide variety of mammals and birds, as well as a "frounce"-like infection in dinosaurs.
