= Moaciria moraveci =

Scientific classification
- Kingdom: Animalia
- Phylum: Nematoda
- Class: Chromadorea
- Order: Rhabditida
- Family: Heterakidae
- Genus: Moaciria
- Species: M. moraveci

Binomial name
- Moaciria moraveci Bursey, Goldberg, and Kraus, 2007

Species of roundworm

Moaciria moraveci is a parasitic worm infecting a Hylophorbus frog on Fergusson Island, Papua New Guinea. It is a member of the genus Moaciria, a nematode in the family Heterakidae. The name of the species honours František Moravec. The genus Moaciria was first described, in 1956, from the Brazilian Noronha skink, but other species from more parts of the world have since been described.

Moaciria moraveci is a small but stout nematode. The male is smaller than the female. In males, total length is 2.59 to 2.85 mm, and in females, it is 2.94 to 4.16 mm.

The only known host is a frog in the genus Hylophorbus from Fergusson, close to but perhaps distinct from Hylophorbus rufescens; it is present in 10 out of 21 specimens examined. It infects the large intestine. Other parasites in this species include Cosmocerca novaeguineae, Cosmocerca tyleri, Oswaldocruzia bakeri, and a species of Physocephalus.

== Literature cited ==
- Bursey, Charles; Goldberg, Stephen & Kraus, Fred (2007). "A new species of Moaciria (Nematoda, Heterakidae) and other helminths in the red Mawatta frog, Hylophorbus cf. rufescens (Anura, Microhylidae) from Papua New Guinea". Acta Parasitologica. 52 (3): 233–237. doi:10.2478/s11686-007-0027-y.
