= Hexamastix coercens =

Scientific classification
- Domain: Eukaryota
- Supergroup: Metamonada
- Phylum: Parabasalia
- Class: Trichomonadea
- Order: Honigbergiellida
- Family: Hexamastigidae
- Genus: Hexamastix
- Species: H. coercens

Binomial name
- Hexamastix coercens Cepicka, Hampl & Kulda, 2010

Species of protist

Hexamastix coercens is a species of parabasalid.
