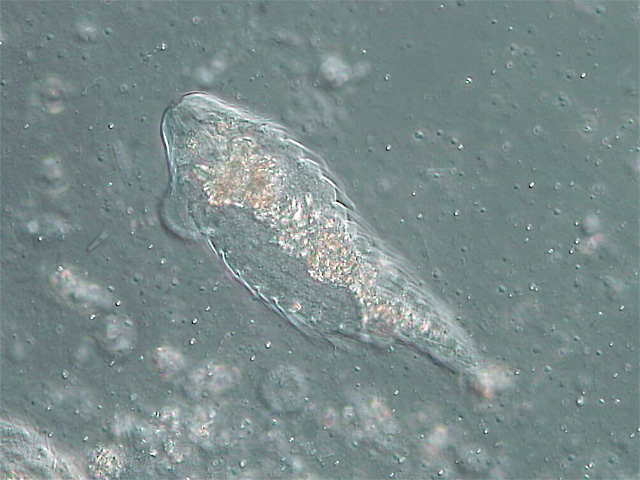
- Hypermastigid

Scientific classification
- Domain: Eukaryota
- Phylum: Metamonada
- Subphylum: Trichozoa
- Clade: Parabasalia

Groups included
- Tritrichomonadea; Hypotrichomonadea; Trichomonadea

Cladistically included but traditionally excluded taxa
- Trichonymphea; Spirotrichonymphea; Cristamonadea

= Hypermastigia =

Group of flagellate parasites

Hypermastigia (hypermastigids) within microbiology, is the name used for a group of flagellate endosymbionts which were placed under the Excavata class. They are now treated as belonging to one of the groups Tritrichomonadea, Hypotrichomonadea, or Trichomonadea within the Parabasalia.
