= Ronidazole =

Names
- Preferred IUPAC name (1-Methyl-5-nitro-1H-imidazol-2-yl)methyl carbamate

Identifiers
CAS Number	7681-76-7
3D model (JSmol)	Interactive image
ChEMBL	ChEMBL290299
ChemSpider	4915
ECHA InfoCard	100.028.796
PubChem CID	5094
UNII	E01R4M1063
CompTox Dashboard (EPA)	DTXSID6045400
- InChI: InChI=1S/C6H8N4O4/c1-9-4(3-14-6(7)11)8-2-5(9)10(12)13/h2H,3H2,1H3,(H2,7,11)
- SMILES: O=C(OCc1ncc(n1C)[N+]([O-])=O)N

Properties
Chemical formula	C_{6}H_{8}N_{4}O_{4}
Molar mass	200.154 g·mol^{−1}

Pharmacology
ATCvet code	QP51CA02 (WHO)
- Except where otherwise noted, data are given for materials in their standard state (at 25 °C [77 °F], 100 kPa). Infobox references

Ronidazole is an antiprotozoal agent used in veterinary medicine for the treatment of histomoniasis and swine dysentery as well as Trichomonas gallinae, hexamitosis, Giardia, and Cochlosoma in all aviary birds and pigeons. It may also have use for the treatment of Tritrichomonas foetus infection in cats and for the treatment of Clostridioides difficile infection in humans.
