= Ernest Tyzzer =

American pathologist and parasitologist

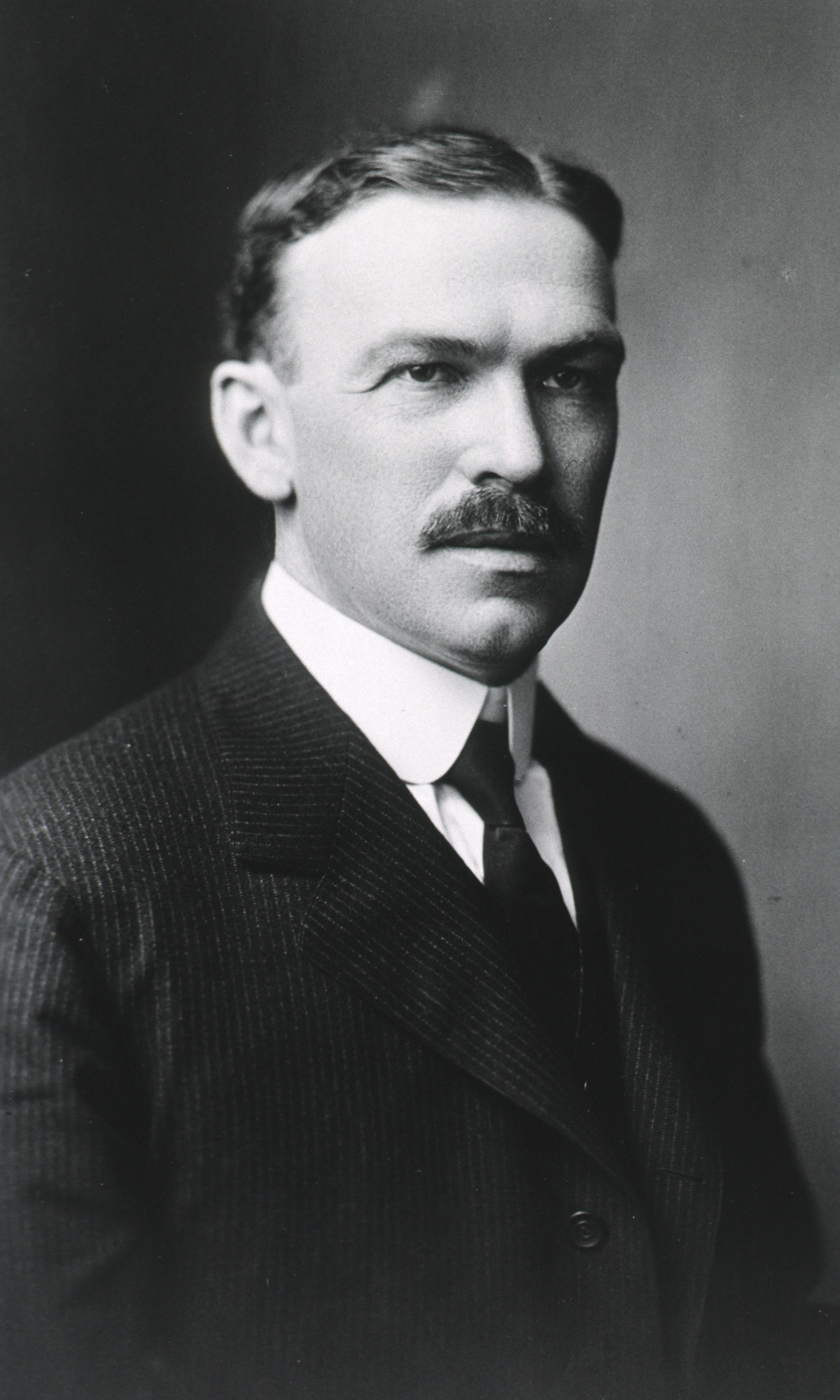
- Tyzzer in 1916
- Born: August 30, 1875; Wakefield, Massachusetts
- Died: January 23, 1965 (aged 89); Wakefield, Massachusetts
- Education: Brown University; Harvard Medical School
- Known for: Cancer genetics; Research on blackhead disease in poultry and its prevention
- Scientific career
- Fields: Cancer research, pathology, parasitology
- Workplaces: Harvard University

Ernest Edward Tyzzer (August 30, 1875 – January 23, 1965) was an American physician, pathologist and parasitologist. He was involved in cancer research but is particularly noted for his work in parasitology, describing numerous new species of avian parasites in a career spanning 40 years.

Tyzzer attended Brown University from 1893 to 1897, funding his studies on the proceeds of trapping animals such as fox and mink. Before attending medical school, he obtained master's degree on flounder (a type of flatfish), partly undertaken at Woods Hole Oceanographic Institution. He began at Harvard Medical School in 1898.

In 1905, while an assistant in Pathology at Harvard, he studied the histology of the skin lesions in varicella, being the first to recognize inclusion bodies in varicella.

In 1907, Tyzzer was a founder member of the American Association for Cancer Research, serving as its president from 1912 to 1913.

In 1913, when he was an assistant professor and director of cancer research at Harvard University, he and two other scientists (Richard P. Strong and C. T. Brues) studied tropical diseases in Peru and Ecuador.

Tyzzer was elected to the American Academy of Arts and Sciences in 1914.

Tyzzer was appointed head of the Department of Comparative Pathology at Harvard in 1916, remaining in that post until his retirement in 1942.

Tyzzer was elected to the American Philosophical Society in 1931 and the United States National Academy of Sciences in 1942.

== Blackhead disease ==
In 1918, Tyzzer began studying infectious enterohepatitis of turkeys, then commonly known as blackhead disease (histomoniasis), which was causing severe losses in the turkey industry and threatening the commercial viability of turkey farming. His studies identified the causative organism as a parasitic protozoan, which he named Histomonas meleagridis. In collaboration with Marshall Fabyan, Tyzzer demonstrated that the protozoan could be harbored within the eggs of the cecal nematode Heterakis gallinarum, and that blackhead resulted from ingestion of contaminated eggs. With this understanding of the disease's transmission cycle, Tyzzer established an experimental turkey farm to develop and demonstrate practical methods for preventing infection. The methods were later described for farmers in pamphlets issued by the Massachusetts Department of Agriculture. In 1942, Tyzzer received a citation from Governor Leverett Saltonstall for saving the turkey industry of Massachusetts.

== Personal life ==
Tyzzer was born in Wakefield, Massachusetts, on August 20, 1875, the youngest of five children. He married Jessie Gowen, and they had three sons surviving into adulthood: Gerald, Franklin, and Roger. Roger died in a boating accident in 1935, aged 26. Jessie died in 1946, and Tyzzer later married Helen Bartlett. He died in 1965 at the age of 89.
