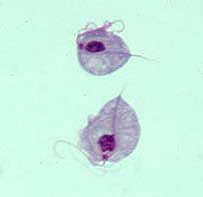
- Two trophozoites of Trichomonas vaginalis stained with Giemsa

Scientific classification
- Domain: Eukaryota
- Supergroup: Metamonada
- Phylum: Parabasalia
- Class: Trichomonadea
- Order: Trichomonadida
- Family: Trichomonadidae
- Genus: Trichomonas

Species
- Trichomonas vulgaris; Trichomonas canistomae; Trichomonas equibuccalis; Trichomonas gallinae; Trichomonas gypaetinii; Trichomonas stableri; Trichomonas tenax; Trichomonas vaginalis

= Trichomonas =

Genus of parasitic, flagellated protists

Trichomonas is a genus of anaerobic excavate parasites of vertebrates. It was first discovered by Alfred François Donné in 1836 when he found these parasites in the vagina of a patient suffering from vaginitis, an inflammation of the vagina. Donné named the genus from its morphological characteristics. The prefix tricho- originates from the Ancient Greek word θρίξ (thrix) meaning hair, describing Trichomonas's flagella. The suffix -monas (μονάς – single unit), describes its similarity to unicellular organisms from the genus Monas.

== Habitat and ecology ==
Trichomonas is typically found in anaerobic environments. It is a known parasite of many different animals including humans, birds, dogs, and cats. In humans, it can be found in the urogenital tract and in the oral cavity. It is estimated that 276 million new cases of urogenital infections occur each year. Depending on the Trichomonas species, it can either be transmitted through direct sexual contact or through contaminated water sources. In birds, it can be found in the upper digestive tract and is transmitted when adult birds regurgitate food to feed their young, when a bird of prey feeds on an infected bird, and through contaminated food or water.

== Morphology ==
Trichomonas is around 10 μm in length and is normally pear-shaped. It has four flagella at its anterior end, distinguishing itself from closely related organisms that have different numbers of anterior flagella. At the base of these flagella are the parabasal bodies, kinetosomes accompanied by Golgi stacks. The pelta is a sheet of microtubules that curves around the flagellar bases. Posterior to the pelta is the axostyle,a bundle of microtubules that extends from the anterior end of the organism all the way to the posterior end. The nucleus of Trichomonas is situated close to where the pelta and axostyle meet.

Another distinguishing feature of Trichomonas is the presence of an undulating membrane which is a fin-like extension of the plasma membrane located on the side of the organism. A flagellum that extends to the posterior end of the organism is attached to the outer edge of the undulating membrane. At the base of the undulating membrane is a striated fiber called the costa, which is thought to exist for structural support.

Trichomonas has the organelle, the hydrogenosome, which is a double-membraned organelle used by trichomonads, instead of mitochondria, to produce ATP. It does not require oxygen and instead uses pyruvate:ferredoxin oxidoreductase and hydrogenase to produce ATP from pyruvate, generating hydrogen gas as a by-product.

== Genetics ==
Trichomonas vaginalis, the species that causes the most complications in humans, is the only Trichomonas species to have its genes fully sequenced. Through whole-genome shotgun sequencing, the T. vaginalis genome is estimated to be around 160 Mb long, divided into six chromosomes, but at least 65% of its genome was found to be redundant. This material is hypothesized to have emerged during Trichomonas's transition from aerobic to anaerobic environments.

In addition to discovering the large proportion of repetitive DNA in the T. vaginalis genome, the sequenced genes were also characterized. About 60,000 protein-coding genes were found. Transfer RNA for all 20 amino acids and around 250 ribosomal RNA genes were all found on the same chromosome.

== Lifecycle ==
Trichomonas's trophozoite form, pear-shaped, is most commonly observed; an amoeboid form appears during host colonization. It lacks a cyst form, but many studies have noted a unique form in which Trichomonas appears ovoidal rather than its typical pear-shaped form. In this ovoidal form, all its flagella are retracted in endocytic vacuoles, giving the impression of a cystic form. Due to the lack of a cystic wall surrounding the organism, though, many studies describe this form as a pseudocystic form.

In its trophozoite form, Trichomonas undergoes cell division through an interesting process called cryptopleuromitosis. The three common forms of mitosis are open, closed, and semiopen. In open mitosis, the nuclear envelope disappears so that mitotic spindles can interact with the chromosomes. In closed mitosis, the nuclear envelope does not disappear, but mitotic spindles appear within the nucleus to separate the chromosomes. In semiopen mitosis, the nuclear envelope remains intact, but the mitotic spindles pierce through the nuclear envelope to divide the chromosomes. Cryptopleuromitosis is different from all the other more commonly known methods of cell division. In it, the chromosomes divide without the breakdown of the nuclear envelope and without the entry of mitotic spindles into the nucleus.

== Diseases ==
Trichomonas causes disease in humans and in birds. In humans, the causative species are T. vaginalis and T. tenax. In birds, the causative species are T. gallinae, T. gypactinii, and T. stableri.

=== In humans ===
T. vaginalis is sexually transmitted and causes trichomoniasis. It resides on squamous epithelium of the urogenital tract. Many carriers of T. vaginalis, especially men, are asymptomatic. Complications for symptomatic women include vaginitis, endometritis, infertility, and cervical cancer. Complications for symptomatic men include urethritis, prostatitis, epididymitis, and infertility. It is also associated with increased risk of transmission and acquisition of HIV.

T. tenax is transmitted through exchange of saliva and contaminated water sources. It is an opportunistic pathogen and may cause pulmonary trichomoniasis.

=== In birds ===
Trichomonas species in birds inhabit the upper digestive tract and also cause trichomoniasis. They create lesions in the trachea and esophagus, occupying space and eventually causing emaciation and asphyxiation.

== Species ==
- T. brixi — inhabits the oral cavity of dogs and cats.
- T.s gallinae — inhabits the upper digestive tract of pigeons and doves, but is also able to cause disease in many other bird species.
- T. gypactinii — inhabits the upper digestive tract of scavenging birds of prey, such as vultures.
- T. stableri — inhabits the upper digestive tract of pigeons.
- T. tenax — inhabits the oral cavity of humans.
- T. vaginalis — infects the urogenital tract of humans.
