= Lactoscope =

Cream-estimating instrument

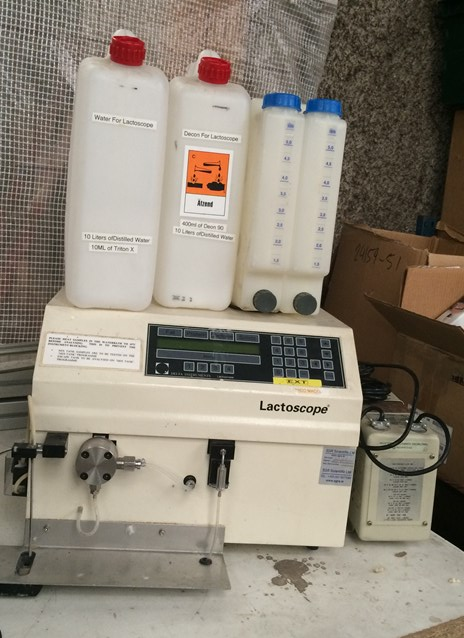
An electronic lactoscope.

The lactoscope is an instrument for estimating the amount of cream in milk, based on its relative opacity. The higher the opacity, the greater the amount of cream present. Credit for the development of this instrument is given to Alfred Donné in 1843. The instrument was also used to measure the fat content of milk, but it gave inaccurate results.

== See also ==
- Lactometer
