= Simplicimonas similis =

Scientific classification
- Domain: Eukaryota
- (unranked): Excavata
- Phylum: Metamonada
- Class: Parabasalia
- Order: Trichomonadida
- Family: Simplicimonadidae
- Genus: Simplicimonas
- Species: S. similis

Binomial name
- Simplicimonas similis Cepicka, Hampl & Kulda, 2010

Species of protist

Simplicimonas similis is a species of parabasalid.
