= Histomonas =

Scientific classification
- Domain: Eukaryota
- Supergroup: Metamonada
- Phylum: Parabasalia
- Class: Dientamoebea
- Order: Dientamoebida
- Family: Dientamoebidae
- Genus: Histomonas; Tyzzer, 1920
- Species: H. meleagridis

Binomial name
- Histomonas meleagridis (Smith, 1895)

Species of protozoan parasite

Histomonas meleagridis is a species of parasitic protozoan that infects a wide range of birds including chickens, turkeys, peafowl, quail and pheasants, causing infectious enterohepatitis, or histomoniasis (blackhead diseases). H. meleagridis can infect many birds, but it is most deadly in turkeys. It inhabits the lumen of cecum and parenchyma of liver, where it causes extensive necrosis. It is transmitted by another cecal parasite, the nematode Heterakis gallinarum.

== Description ==
Histomonas meleagridis is a microscopic, pleomorphic protozoan, and can exist in two forms, amoeboid and flagellated. Within the tissue, it is present as an amoeboid protozoan, while in the lumen or free in the contents of cecum, it lives as an elongated flagellated form. The amoeboid form is typically 8–15 μm in diameter, whereas the flagellated form can reach up to 30 μm in diameter. Histomonads do not possess mitochondria, but instead produce energy inside hydrogenosomes. The flagellum shows the common 9x2+2 type.

== Lifecycle ==
Histomonas meleagridis reproduces by binary fission. The free trophozoites are very delicate and can survive only for a few hours in the external environment. However, they are transmitted between flocks in the eggs of Heterakis gallinarum, a cecal nematode, which in turn can be transmitted by earthworms that ingested the nematode eggs. The eggs with the trophozoites are passed out into the environment through the feces. In this way, the trophozoites can remain viable up to two years in the external environment. Within turkey flocks H. meleagridis is also known to be directly transmitted from bird to bird. Histomonads, either released from the heterakid nematode larvae in the ceca or after direct infection via the cloaca, replicate rapidly in the cecal tissues. They migrate to the submucosa and muscularis mucosae and cause severe necrosis. The parasites then move to the liver through the vascular system. There, they cause typical crater-like necrotic lesions. Mortality in turkey flocks can be very high (80–100%).

== Pathogenicity ==
Histomonas meleagridis is the causal organism of histomoniasis of gallinaceous birds. It induces extensive and severe necrosis of the tissues of the mucosa and submucosa of cecum and parenchyma of the liver. The lesions are sometimes exacerbated by other pathogens such as Escherichia coli and coccidia. The symptoms appear within seven to 12 days after infection, and include depression, reduced appetite, poor growth, increased thirst, sulphur-yellow diarrhoea, listlessness, drooping wings, and unkempt feathers. The symptoms are highly fatal to turkeys, but effect less damage in chickens. However, outbreaks in chickens may result in high morbidity, moderate mortality, and extensive culling, leading to overall poor flock performance. Concurrence of Salmonella typhmurium and E. coli was found to cause high mortality in broiler chickens. Young birds, particularly those three to 12 weeks old, are most susceptible. Generally, the symptoms are profound in turkeys, while chickens are usually asymptomatic.

== Diagnosis and control ==
Diagnosis can be easily performed by necropsy of the fresh or preserved carcass, particularly on the liver. Recently paromomycin has been approved by the Italian authorities for treatment (Paromomicina 200 mg/g Huvepharma). However good management of the farm and sanitation are the essential effective strategies to control the spread of infection.
