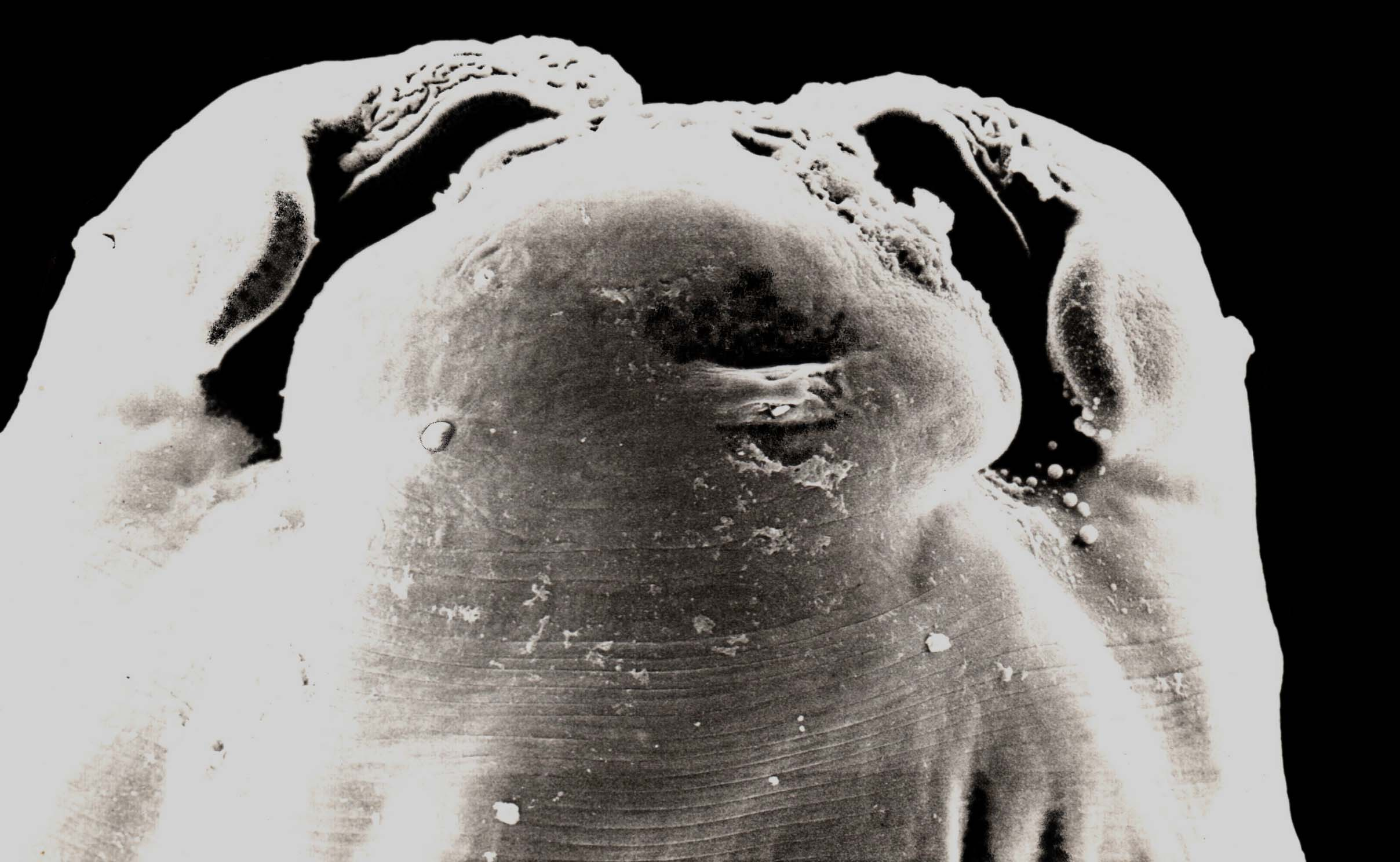

Scientific classification
- Domain: Eukaryota
- Kingdom: Animalia
- Phylum: Nematoda
- Class: Chromadorea
- Order: Ascaridida
- Family: Heterakidae
- Genus: Heterakis
- Species: H. gallinarum

Binomial name
- Heterakis gallinarum Schrank, 1788

Synonyms
- Heterakis gallinae Heterakis papillosa Heterakis vesicularis Ascaris gallinae Ascaris vesicularis

= Heterakis gallinarum =

Species of roundworm

Heterakis gallinarum is a nematode parasite that lives in the cecum of some galliform birds, particularly in ground feeders such as domestic chickens and turkeys. It causes infection that is mildly pathogenic. However, it often carries a protozoan parasite Histomonas meleagridis which causes histomoniasis (blackhead disease). Transmission of H. meleagridis is through the H. gallinarum egg. H. gallinarum is about 1–2 cm in length with a sharply pointed tail and a preanal sucker. The parasite is a diecious species with marked sexual dimorphism. Males are smaller and shorter, measuring around 9 mm in length, with a unique bent tail. Females are stouter and longer, measuring roughly 13 mm in length, with a straight tail end.

== Lifecycle ==
H. gallinarum has a direct lifecycle involving birds such as chickens, turkeys, ducks, geese, grouse, guineafowl, partridges, pheasants, and quails as definitive hosts. Eggs of H. gallinarum are passed in feces by the host. At optimal temperature (22 °C), they become infective in 12–14 days and remain infective for years in soil. Upon ingestion by a host, the embryonated eggs hatch into second-stage juveniles in the gizzard or duodenum, and are passed to the cecum. Their development is completed in the lumen, but some may enter the mucosa and remain for years without further development. The prepatent time is 24–30 days. Earthworms and houseflies are considered paratenic hosts, as they can ingest the egg in feces and a juvenile may hatch in tissues, which stays dormant until eaten by birds.

== Epidemiology ==
H. gallinarum is geographically distributed worldwide, commonly found in chickens, domesticated turkeys, and many other species of fowl, primarily of poultry. Their eggs are found to live for years in soil making it difficult to eliminate H. gallinarum from a domestic flock. Earthworms may ingest the eggs of H. gallinarum and contribute to the cause of infections in poultry. Although the eggs are themselves infective, they can develop further into a second infective larval stage. This development occurs around 27 °C and takes 2–4 weeks.

== Pathogenesis ==
H. gallinarum infection is itself is mildly pathogenic. However, H. gallinarum plays the role of carrier in the lifecycle of Histomonas meleagridis, the causal pathogen of enterohepatitis "blackhead" of turkeys. H. meleagridis stays viable while inside the egg of H. gallinarum. Heavy infection in pheasants indicated gross lesions characterized by congestion, thickening, petechial haemorrhages of the mucosa, intussusception, and nodules in the cecal wall. In addition under microscopy, chronic diffuse typhlitis, haemosiderosis, granulomas with necrotic center in the submucosa and leiomyomas in the submucosa, muscular and serosa associated with immature H. gallinarum worms were observed.

== Diagnosis and treatment ==
Primary infections are usually not apparent. Secondary infections are characterized by the formation of nodules in the cecum and the submucosa of the cecum. During heavy infections, intestinal walls may thicken and exhibit marked inflammation. In egg-laying hens, heavy infection significantly reduces egg production. Diagnosis commonly is through the presence of eggs in host feces. Effective treatment is by using mebendazole, which is normally distributed to a flock of birds in their food and water. In addition, rearing the birds on hardware cloth assists in the elimination this parasite. Free-range chickens can also be infected.
