= Hylophorbus picoides =

Conservation status
- Least Concern (IUCN 3.1)

Scientific classification
- Kingdom: Animalia
- Phylum: Chordata
- Class: Amphibia
- Order: Anura
- Family: Microhylidae
- Genus: Hylophorbus
- Species: H. picoides

Binomial name
- Hylophorbus picoides Günther, 2001

Species of frog

Hylophorbus picoides is a species of frog in the family Microhylidae. It is endemic to West Papua, Indonesia. Its natural habitat is subtropical or tropical moist lowland forests. It is threatened by habitat loss.
