= Hylophorbus rainerguentheri =

Conservation status
- Least Concern (IUCN 3.1)

Scientific classification
- Kingdom: Animalia
- Phylum: Chordata
- Class: Amphibia
- Order: Anura
- Family: Microhylidae
- Genus: Hylophorbus
- Species: H. rainerguentheri

Binomial name
- Hylophorbus rainerguentheri Richards and Oliver, 2007

Species of amphibian

Hylophorbus rainerguentheri is a frog species in the family Microhylidae. It is endemic to New Guinea and only known from the Huon Peninsula in the Morobe Province, Papua New Guinea. The specific name rainerguentheri honours Rainer Günther, a German herpetologist from the Natural History Museum, Berlin. Common name Huon Mawatta frog has been proposed for this species.

== Description ==
Adult males measure 30–31 mm (1.2–1.2 in) in snout–vent length; females are unknown. The body is robust and broader than the head. The snout is truncate and rounded in lateral profile and truncate in dorsal view. The tympanum is indistinct and the supra-tympanic fold is short. The fingers and toes are unwebbed but bear discs with distinct circum-marginal grooves. The dorsum is mostly brown but bears conspicuous, dark brown lumbar ocelli; some mottling may be present too. The flanks are flesh-toned and have small whitish flecks, sometimes also small brown spots and blotches. Some specimens have a faint, flesh-toned inter-orbital bar. The legs have cross-bars.

The male advertisement call is a very long series of single-note calls, lasting up to two minutes. A single call lasts about 0.1 seconds. The dominant frequency is relatively low, about 1100 Hz.

== Habitat and conservation ==
Hylophorbus rainerguentheri in habits extremely wet, lower-montane rainforests at elevations of 1,100–1,830 m (3,610–6,000 ft) above sea level. Males have been observed calling from the ground or from logs on the forest floor, or from more elevated positions (≤1.5 m (5 ft) above the ground), normally from inside dense clumps of moss on tree trunks or tree branches.

Threats to this species are not known. The type locality is a reasonably well-protected Wildlife Management Area, thanks to efforts to protect tree-kangaroos.
