= Jody L. Gookin =

American professor at North Carolina State University

Jody L. Gookin is a distinguished professor at North Carolina State University. Her research is concerned with small animal gastroenterology. Gookin and her associates identified Tritrichomonas foetus in felines and then pioneered the diagnosis and treatment of the infection.

== Education ==
She earned a Doctor of Veterinary Medicine degree from the University of California, Davis and she has a Ph.D. in Gastrointestinal physiology from North Carolina State University. She became a Diplomate of the American College of Veterinary Internal Medicine following the completion of the Small Animal Internal Medicine Clinician Scientist training program at North Carolina State University.

== Career ==
Gookin is a Distinguished Professor in the Department of Clinical Sciences and she is a Chancellor's University Faculty Scholar at North Carolina State University. She is a researcher, also involved with clinical service and teaching. Much of her research centers on feline gastroenterology. Gookin and her associates identified the parasite Tritrichomonas foetus as a cause of infectious diarrhea in cats. Her continued research has resulted in advances in the diagnosis and treatment of this infection.

In 2011 she received an American Veterinary Medical Association Research Award.
