= Strawberry cervix =

Medical sign

A strawberry cervix is a finding upon physical examination where the cervix has an erythematous, punctate, and papilliform appearance. It is named because of the superficial similar appearance to a strawberry.

As opposed to a more general inflammation of the cervix found in cervicitis, the strawberry cervix appearance is considered to be selectively associated with Trichomonas infections. A clinician discovering this finding would have a high suspicion for Trichomonas infection.

== See also ==
- Strawberry tongue
- Blueberry muffin baby
- Petechia
