= Tooth worm =

Erroneous theory of dental disease

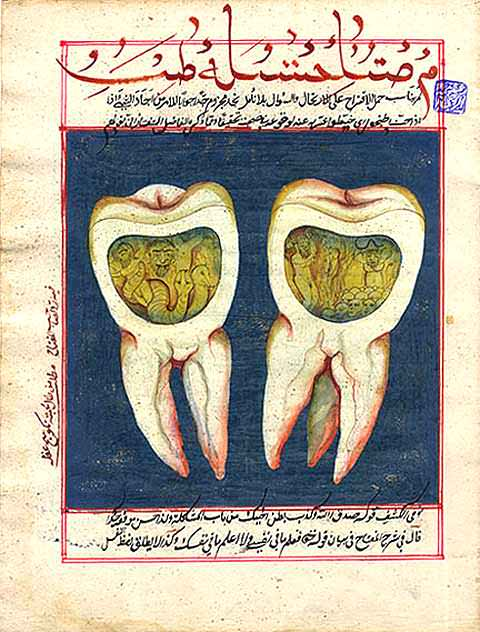
18th century hand-illustrated page from an Ottoman Turk dental book

The idea of a tooth worm is a hypothesis of the cause of dental caries, periodontitis and toothaches. Once widespread, the belief is now obsolete, having been superseded by more scientific rationales. It was supposed that the disease was caused by small worms resident within the tooth, eating it away.

== History ==
The origins of the belief are wrapped in obscurity. A prominent early mention, a Babylonian cuneiform tablet titled "The Legend of the Worm" (sometimes erroneously dated to Sumerian times), recounts how the tooth worm drinks the blood and eats the roots of the teeth – causing caries and periodontitis:

"After Anu [had created heaven],
Heaven had created [the earth],
The earth had created the rivers,
The rivers had created the canals,
The canals had created the marsh,
(And) the marsh had created the worm—
The worm went, weeping, before Shamash, his tears flowing before Ea: "What wilt thou give for my food? What wilt thou give me for my sucking?"
"I shall give thee the ripe fig, (and) the apricot."
"Of what use are they to me, the ripe fig and the apricot? Lift me up and among the teeth and the gums cause me to dwell! The blood of the tooth I will suck, and of the gum I will gnaw its roots!"

Accounts are also found in the Central American legends of Popol Vuh. The belief persisted into the 18th century, only being disproven by the microscopical endeavors of M. Pierre Fauchard. Modern veterinary practice shows that when removed intact, the necrotic or partially necrotic tooth pulp can have an appearance like that of a worm.

Sinhalese Charm for toothache:

Ira deyené asyā!
Sanda deyené aeyā!
Passé Buduné acyā!
Daté nositoo dat aeyā!

Worm of the sun-god!
Worm of the moon god!
Worm of the Passé Buddha!
Stay not in the tooth, thou tooth-worm!

== Evidence ==
A 2009 study by the University of Maryland Baltimore using micro imaging revealed worm-like structures within a dissected molar, though not worms or caused by worms. It is unclear what these structures are or what caused them.

== See also ==
- Trichomonas tenax
