= Hylophorbus wondiwoi =

Conservation status
- Least Concern (IUCN 3.1)

Scientific classification
- Kingdom: Animalia
- Phylum: Chordata
- Class: Amphibia
- Order: Anura
- Family: Microhylidae
- Genus: Hylophorbus
- Species: H. wondiwoi

Binomial name
- Hylophorbus wondiwoi Günther, 2001

Species of amphibian

Hylophorbus wondiwoi is a species of frogs in the family Microhylidae. It is endemic to West Papua, Indonesia. Its natural habitat is subtropical or tropical moist lowland forests. It is threatened by habitat loss.
