= Meteterakis =

Scientific classification
- Domain: Eukaryota
- Kingdom: Animalia
- Phylum: Nematoda
- Class: Chromadorea
- Order: Ascaridida
- Family: Heterakidae
- Genus: Meteterakis; Karve, 1930

Genus of roundworms

Meteterakis is a genus of nematodes belonging to the family Heterakidae.

The species of this genus are found in Malesia and Japan.

Species:

- Meteterakis amamiensis
- Meteterakis formosensis Karve, 1930
- Meteterakis formosensis Sata, 2018
- Meteterakis ishikawanae Hasegawa, 1987
- Meteterakis japonica Wilkie, 1930
- Meteterakis occidentalis Karve, 1930
- Meteterakis occidentalis Sata, 2018
- Meteterakis singaporensis
- Meteterakis wangi
- Meteterakis wonosoboensis
