= Heterakis =

Scientific classification
- Domain: Eukaryota
- Kingdom: Animalia
- Phylum: Nematoda
- Class: Chromadorea
- Order: Ascaridida
- Family: Heterakidae
- Genus: Heterakis; Schrank, 1790

Diversity
- ~10 species

Genus of roundworms

Heterakis is a genus of parasitic nematodes. Members of the genus are minute roundworms, hardly 1 cm long, infecting different species of gallinaceous birds, including chickens, turkeys, ducks, geese, grouse, guineafowl, partridges, pheasants, and quail. About 10 species are placed in the genus, but classification is often ambiguous due to their close resemblance, and a number of synonyms have arisen. H. gallinarum Schrank, 1788; H. isolonche von Linstow, 1906; and H. dispar Schrank, 1870 are the best understood species in terms of prevalence, pathogenicity, and biology. They inhabit the lumen of the cecum of the host.

The nematodes are whitish in colour, cylindrical, and with fine longitudinal striations throughout the body. The body covering is a proteinaceous layer named cuticle. The anterior end is the mouth with distinct lips, and the anus opens towards the posterior. They are diecious with marked sexual dimorphism. Males are shorter and smaller, with straight blunt tails, while females are bigger and longer, with curved tails. They all exhibit direct lifecycles. They cause nodular typhlitis, diarrhoea, emaciation, and death. H. gallinarum is the most well-known species, and is most important as it transmits the protozoan parasite, Histomonas meleagridis in birds.
