= Hylophorbus rufescens =

Conservation status
- Data Deficient (IUCN 3.1)

Scientific classification
- Kingdom: Animalia
- Phylum: Chordata
- Class: Amphibia
- Order: Anura
- Family: Microhylidae
- Genus: Hylophorbus
- Species: H. rufescens

Binomial name
- Hylophorbus rufescens Macleay, 1878

Synonyms
- Metopostira ocellata Méhely, 1901; Metopostira macra Van Kampen, 1906; Hylophorbus ocellatus (Méhely, 1901); Phrynomantis ocellatus (Méhely, 1901); Phrynomantis rufescens (Macleay, 1878); Asterophrys rufescens (Macleay, 1878)

Species of frog

Hylophorbus rufescens is a species of frog in the family Microhylidae. It is endemic to New Guinea and some nearby islands, and occurs in both West Papua (Indonesia) and Papua New Guinea. Common name red Mawatta frog has been coined for it.

Three subspecies are recognized:

- Hylophorbus rufescens rufescens Macleay, 1878
- Hylophorbus rufescens extimus Zweifel, 1972
- Hylophorbus rufescens myopicus Zweifel, 1972

However, it is a species complex that is not yet fully resolved. Because of continual uncertainties with delimitation of this species, its range cannot be determined accurately.

The Fergusson Island form, which may be distinct from H. rufescens proper, is infected by the nematode Moaciria moraveci.

Hylophorbus rufescens is a terrestrial frog living on the forest floor in tropical rainforests at elevations up to 3,570 m (11,710 ft) above sea level. It is nocturnal.
