= Hylophorbus infulatus =

Conservation status
- Data Deficient (IUCN 3.1)

Scientific classification
- Kingdom: Animalia
- Phylum: Chordata
- Class: Amphibia
- Order: Anura
- Family: Microhylidae
- Genus: Hylophorbus
- Species: H. infulatus

Binomial name
- Hylophorbus infulatus (Zweifel, 1972)

Synonyms
- Phrynomantis infulata Zweifel, 1972; Mantophryne infulata (Zweifel, 1972); Hylophorbus infulata (Zweifel, 1972)

Species of frog

Hylophorbus infulatus is a species of frog in the family Microhylidae. It is endemic to New Guinea and known from its type locality, Arau in the Kratke Mountains, as well as from the Adelbert Range, both in Papua New Guinea. Common name Arau archipelago frog has been proposed for it.

== Description ==
Hylophorbus infulatus is a relatively slender and long-legged frog. The holotype is an adult female measuring 37 mm (1.5 in) in snout–vent length; the maximum length is 39 mm (1.5 in) SVL. The head is narrower than the body. The eyes are relatively large. The tympanum is indistinct, as is the supratympanic fold. The fingers and toes have small, grooved discs. The back is brown with indistinct brown mottling, surrounded by two dorsolateral dark-brown bands alluded to in its specific name infulatus, which is Latin for "adorned with a band". The bands are sharply delimited towards the light gray-brown flanks and belly. The throat is heavily mottled with brown. Males have a single subgular vocal sac.

== Habitat and conservation ==
Hylophorbus infulatus is known from transitional zone between mature mid-montane and lower-montane forest, at elevations of 1,100–1,400 m (3,600–4,600 ft) above sea level. Males call from exposed positions on the forest floor. It has been recorded as reasonably common where it has been encountered. Threats to this species are unknown. It is not known to occur in any protected areas.
