= Bronislaw M. Honigberg =

Zoologist

Bronisław M. Honigberg
- Born: May 14, 1920
- Died: May 1, 1992 (aged 71); Amherst, Massachusetts, US
- Resting place: Wildwood Cemetery, Amherst.
- Citizenship: Naturalized American
- Education: University of California, Berkeley
- Known for: Kinetoplastida
- Spouse: Rhoda Honigberg
- Children: 2
- Scientific career
- Fields: Protozoology; Parasitology
- Workplaces: University of Massachusetts Amherst
- Author abbrev. (zoology): Honigberg

Bronisław M. Honigberg (14 May 1920 – 1 May 1992) was a Polish-born American zoologist. Born in Warsaw, he settled in the United States as a refugee during World War II. He was professor of parasitology at the University of Massachusetts Amherst. His research centered on unicellular organisms such as Trichomonadida and Kinetoplastida, the name which he invented. He was a leading authority on the naming system (systematics) of protozoans. He led the Committee on Taxonomy and Taxonomical Problems of the Society of Protozoologists and made a new Systematics of Protozoa in 1964.

A protozoan, Ditrichomonas honigbergii, described in 1993 was named in his honour.

== Biography ==
Bronisław M. Honigberg was born and educated in Warsaw, Poland. He completed secondary education just before World War II broke out. He and his family fled to US. They arrived at San Francisco on 10 May 1941 by the ship Asama Maru. They were detained at the port as their ticket was not specific for the family. Confirming that he was a medical student, they were released after five days.

Entering the University of California, Berkeley, he earned a BA in 1943, an MA in 1946, PhD in 1950. His research was supervised by Harold Kirby, who had established the order Trichomonadida.

He became naturalized citizen in 1948. In 1950, he was appointed assistant professor at the University of Massachusetts Amherst, becoming full professor in 1961. He was director of the Parasitological Center of the university from 1980. He continued research on protozoology, concentrating on trichomonads and kinetoplastids.

In 1963, he became chairman of the first Committee on Taxonomy and Taxonomical Problems of the Society of Protozoologists. Under his leadership a revised Systematics of Protozoa was published in 1964.

He died of heart attack, and is interred at Wildwood Cemetery at Amherst. He and his wife Rhoda had two sons, Paul Mark and Martin Philip.

== Honours ==
Honigberg was elected honorary member of the International Society of Protozoologists in 1979. He was member of the International Union of Biological Sciences Commission on Protozoology from 1965 to 1985, Committee on Nomenclature of Protists of the International Commission on Zoological Nomenclature, and various sections of US Public Health Services. He was president of the Society of Protozoologists in 1965, and editor-in-chief of the society's journal The Journal of Protozoology from 1971 to 1980. He was also elected president of the American Microscopical Society in 1964. He was elected member of the New York Academy of Sciences, the American Society of Zoologists, the Royal Society of Tropical Medicine and Hygiene, and the American Association for the Advancement of Science.
