= Hylophorbus proekes =

Scientific classification
- Kingdom: Animalia
- Phylum: Chordata
- Class: Amphibia
- Order: Anura
- Family: Microhylidae
- Genus: Hylophorbus
- Species: H. proekes

Binomial name
- Hylophorbus proekes Kraus and Allison, 2009

Species of frog

Hylophorbus proekes is a species of frog in the family Microhylidae. It is endemic to Papua New Guinea and only known from the vicinity of its type locality on the southern slope of Mount Sapau in the Torricelli Mountains, West Sepik Province.

Hylophorbus proekes is only known from Mount Sapau in the Torricelli Mountains

== Description ==
Adult males measure 27–35 mm (1.1–1.4 in) and adult females 33–37 mm (1.3–1.5 in) in snout–vent length. The snout is relatively long and pointed, especially in adults. The fingers and toes are unwebbed but bear discs with terminal grooves. Dorsal skin is pustulose. The dorsum is dark gray-brown or mud-brown, flecked or blotched with black. The fronts of the thighs and groin have conspicuous series of bright orange spots. The venter is gray with darker flecks. The iris is black, speckled with silver.

The male advertisement call is a rapid train of 5–7 pulsed, barking notes. The calls are delivered at intervals of 8–27 seconds and dominant frequency of about 1000 Hz.

== Habitat and conservation ==
Hylophorbus proekes is known from primary lowland and lower montane rainforests of Mount Sapau at elevations of 450–1,150 m (1,480–3,770 ft) above sea level. It was fairly common in the area. Males call while hidden under leaves, but sometimes also from exposed sites on the ground. As of late 2020, the conservation status of this species has not been assessed by the International Union for Conservation of Nature (IUCN).
