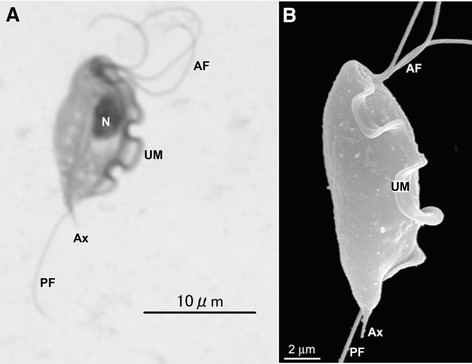

Scientific classification
- Domain: Eukaryota
- Clade: Metamonada
- Phylum: Parabasalia
- Clade: Cadamassta
- Class: Tritrichomonadea; Čepička, Hampl & Kulda 2010 emend. Boscaro & Keeling 2024
- Order: Tritrichomonadida; Čepička, Hampl & Kulda 2010 emend. Boscaro & Keeling 2024
- Family: Tritrichomonadidae; Čepička, Hampl & Kulda 2010
- Genus: Tritrichomonas; Kofoid 1920

= Tritrichomonas =

Genus of flagellated protists

Tritrichomonas is a genus of single-celled flagellated parasitic excavates, some of whose species are known to be pathogens of the bovine reproductive tract as well as the intestinal tract of felines.

== Species ==
Example species within the genus Tritrichomonas are T. augusta and T. foetus, the latter of which characteristically interacts with bacteria that reside in the intestinal tract by adhering to the intestinal epithelium of the host. T. augusta have been observed in the rough-skinned newt, Taricha granulosa, in certain northern California coastal counties in the United States.
