= Hylophorbus =

Scientific classification
- Kingdom: Animalia
- Phylum: Chordata
- Class: Amphibia
- Order: Anura
- Family: Microhylidae
- Subfamily: Asterophryinae
- Genus: Hylophorbus; Macleay, 1878

Type species
- Hylophorbus rufescens Macleay, 1878

Species
- 12 species (see text)

Synonyms
- Metopostira Méhely, 1901

Genus of amphibians

Hylophorbus is a genus of microhylid frogs endemic to New Guinea. Common name Mawatta frogs has been coined for them.

Molecular data suggest that Hylophorbus is monophyletic and that its sister taxon is Callulops.

== Species ==
There are 12 recognized species:

- Hylophorbus atrifasciatus Kraus, 2013
- Hylophorbus infulatus (Zweifel, 1972)
- Hylophorbus nigrinus Günther, 2001
- Hylophorbus picoides Günther, 2001
- Hylophorbus proekes Kraus and Allison, 2009
- Hylophorbus rainerguentheri Richards and Oliver, 2007
- Hylophorbus richardsi Günther, 2001
- Hylophorbus rufescens Macleay, 1878
- Hylophorbus sextus Günther, 2001
- Hylophorbus sigridae Günther, Richards, and Dahl, 2014
- Hylophorbus tetraphonus Günther, 2001
- Hylophorbus wondiwoi Günther, 2001
