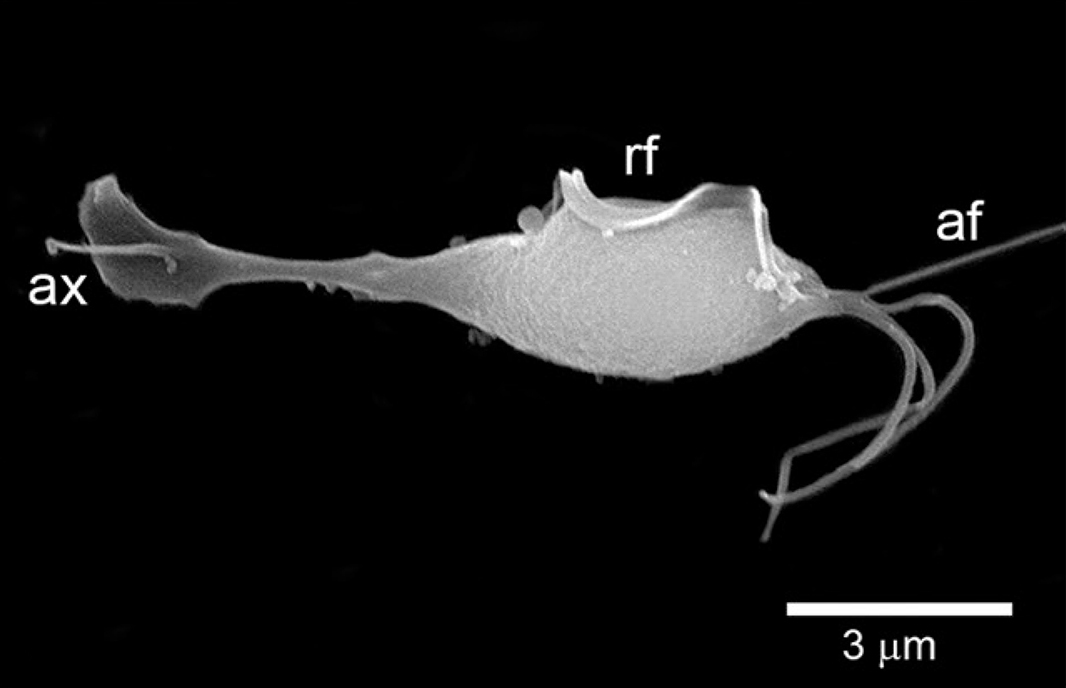
- Trichomonas vaginalis observed by scanning electron microscopy showing the axostyle (ax), the anterior flagella (af) and the undulating membrane (rf).

Scientific classification
- Domain: Eukaryota
- Supergroup: Metamonada
- Phylum: Parabasalia
- Class: Trichomonadea
- Order: Trichomonadida
- Family: Trichomonadidae
- Genus: Trichomonas
- Species: T. vaginalis

Binomial name
- Trichomonas vaginalis (Donné 1836)

= Trichomonas vaginalis =

Species of parasite that causes sexually transmitted infections

Trichomonas vaginalis is an anaerobic, flagellated protozoan parasite and the causative agent of a sexually transmitted disease called trichomoniasis. The parasite commonly infects the human urogenital tract and ranks as the most widespread non-viral sexually transmitted infection, with an approximated 156 million reported cases worldwide in 2020 among individuals aged 15-49 years.

T. vaginalis is typically asymptomatic in both men and women, causing infected individuals to unknowingly transmit the parasite to sexual partners. Symptomatic infections are associated with inflammation of the urogenital tract, and infection can potentially be linked to adverse pregnancy outcomes and increased HIV acquisition risk. Transmission usually occurs via human sexual intercourse. Treatment for T. vaginalis infections typically employ the use of either metronidazole or tinidazole.

More recent studies on Trichomonas vaginalis have shed light on the parasite's evolution, genomic complexity, and pathogenesis processes. Recent population studies and genomic sequences on T. vaginalis have revealed an unusually large genome containing extensive repetitive DNA and expanded gene families associated with parasite-host interactions and pathogenesis, indicating the parasite's possible resistance to treatment. Understanding of host-pathogen interaction and prevention strategies remains a driving force behind public health.

== Clinical ==
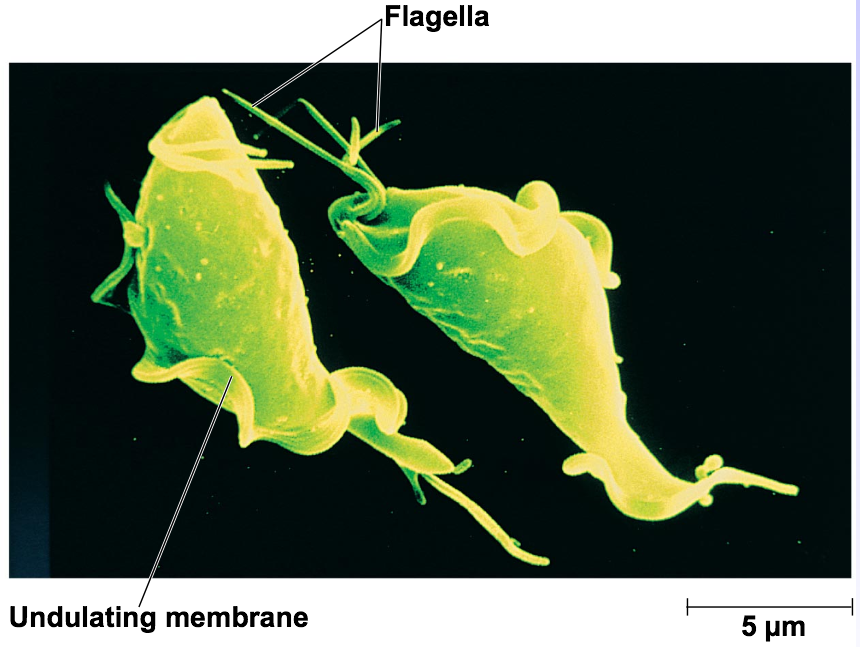
Trichomonas vaginalis protozoa. Colorized SEM

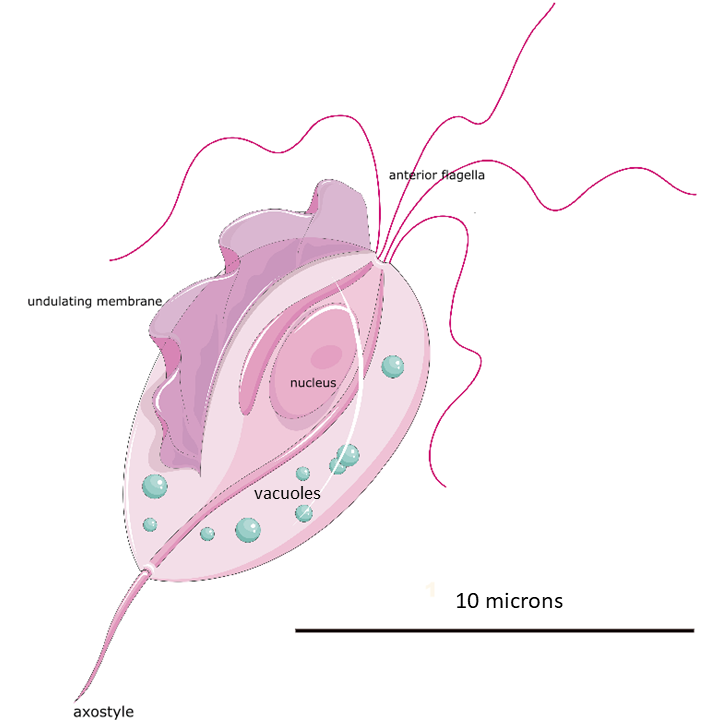
The structure of Trichomonas vaginalis

=== History ===
Trichomonas vaginalis from a vaginal swab. This is a heavy infection; there were probably thousands of trichomonads in the vagina.

Alfred Francois Donné (1801–1878) was the first to describe a procedure to diagnose trichomoniasis through "the microscopic observation of motile protozoa in vaginal or cervical secretions" in 1836. He published this in the article entitled, "Animalcules observés dans les matières purulentes et le produit des sécrétions des organes génitaux de l'homme et de la femme" in the journal, Comptes rendus de l'Académie des sciences. With it, he created the binomial name of the parasite as Trichomonas vaginalis. In 1916, 80 years after the initial discovery of the parasitic protozoan, O. Hohne termed the infection of the vaginal mucosa with T. vaginalis "Trichomoniasis".

=== Signs and symptoms ===
Pap smear, showing infection by Trichomonas vaginalis. Papanicolaou stain, 400×

Most women (85%) and men (77%) infected with T. vaginalis do not have symptoms. Half of these women can develop symptoms within 6 months and can have vaginal erythema, dyspareunia, dysuria, and vaginal discharge, which is often diffuse, malodorous, and yellow-green, along with itching in the genital region. Strawberry cervix occurs in about 5% of women. While men are commonly asymptomatic as a result of lower average parasite burden, cases of symptomatic infections in men have been observed. These infections cause symptoms of urethritis, and untreated infections can travel from the urethra to the prostate causing prostatitis. More severe cases of T. vaginalis have been associated with balanoposthitis, epididymitis, and infertility.

=== Complications ===
T. vaginalis is associated with many complications such as the acquisition of STIs such as HIV, HPV (which can lead to cervical neoplasia), and others. Additionally, T. vaginalis can be associated with infertility and adverse birth outcomes. The birth outcomes associated with T. vaginalis are preterm delivery, low birth weight, and pre-labor rupture of membranes. It is possible for T. vaginalis to cause oral and rectal infections, but this is rare compared to the standard infection site, which is the female lower genital tract and the male urethra and prostate.

=== Diagnosis ===
A single trichomonas by phase contrast microscopy

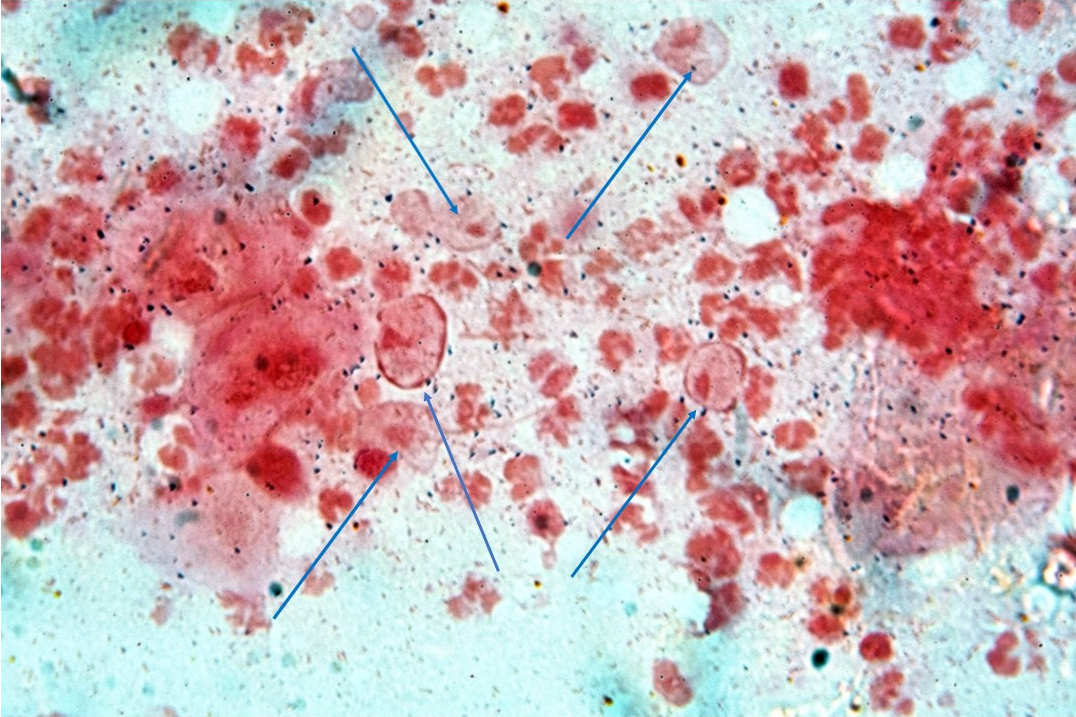
Trichomonas vaginalis Gram stain (arrows)

Because men infected with T. vaginalis are often asymptomatic and demonstrate lower parasite burdens than infected women, ease of diagnosis depends greatly on sex. Historically, the most commonly used diagnostic test for T. vaginalis was done using cultures, having a specificity of 100% and sensitivity of 40-56%. This method was considered the gold standard until development of the highly sensitive nucleic acid amplification tests (NAATs), which demonstrate much higher sensitivity upwards of 97%. NAATs also provide results at a much faster rate than traditional cultures, as cultures require long incubation periods of around three days for women and five to seven days in men. With a cervical smear, infected women may have a transparent "halo" around their superficial cell nucleus but more typically the organism itself is seen with a, "slight cyanophilic tinge, faint eccentric nuclei, and fine acidophilic granules." It is unreliably detected by studying a genital discharge or with a cervical smear because of their low sensitivity. T. vaginalis is also routinely diagnosed via a wet mount in which motility is observed, however this method has low sensitivity when used for male genital specimens.

=== Prevention and treatment ===
Infection is treated and cured with metronidazole or tinidazole. It was found that women have the best results with 500 milligrams of metronidazole, twice daily, for seven days. However, the recommended treatment for men is a one-time dose of 2g of metronidazole. Sexual partners of those with T. vaginalis should also be promptly medicated due to the frequency of transmission. The prevention of T. vaginalis is best achieved through the minimization of exposure and regular screening of those with higher risks. The correct use of condoms can minimize exposure by creating physical barriers. Screening for T. vaginalis is important because many people who are infected do not experience symptoms, but regular screening is mainly advised for those with a higher risk of infection or risks following infection.

=== Vaccine research ===
There is not a vaccine for Trichomonas vaginalis yet but researchers think that making one is possible. Researchers think this is because there is already a vaccine for a similar disease that infects cattle, Tritrichomonas foetus. A human vaccine was experimented with in the 60s, 100 women were given the vaccine and their symptoms had improved but this study was not repeated again. A vaccine was also tested on mice with Trichomonas cells, the vaccine lowered infection and helped the mice recover faster. Some of the parasite proteins overlap in terms of morphology, a vaccine might help to act against multiple strains.

=== Drug resistance ===
Metronidazole is the standard drug prescribed for Trichomonas vaginalis, but studies have shown that this drug shows resistance 4.3%-10% of the time. While metronidazole resistance can develop both clinically (aerobic resistance) or be induced in the laboratory (anaerobic resistance), a study recognized a shared characteristic in both types. This study linked the downregulation of a ferric iron reductase enzyme with metronidazole resistance. The specific enzyme is flavin reductase 1 (FR1), which is involved in the reduction of ferric iron to ferrous iron in T. vaginalis. Large amounts of ferrous iron bind to T. vaginalis cell proteins which facilitates the formation of radicals that make proteins vulnerable to damage. When this enzyme is down-regulated, less iron is found on these proteins, and this contributes to metronidazole resistance. This mechanism is especially pronounced in aerobic resistance.

== Epidemiology ==
A systematic review and meta-analysis based on 425 articles, published in 2025, indicated the global prevalence rate of T. vaginalis as 8%, with country-specific rates ranging from 1 to 35%. The prevalence was correlated with behavior and was significantly higher in subgroups including smoking, drug use, and not using condoms, and in the group with other sexually transmitted infections, including HIV, herpes simplex virus, and Chlamydia infection. Socioeconomic factors such as being unmarried, having a low income, and unstable employment were associated with an increased risk. Trichomanos is known to peak later than most infections, the highest rates are in ages 35-40. In some wealthier countries, the rates of Trichomonas vaginalis have been decreasing.

== Pathogenesis ==
T. vaginalis causes a very common sexually transmitted disease by adhering to vaginal epithelial cells and breaking them down. It secretes extracellular vesicles that disrupt immune function and increase adhesion. Some strains have intracellular viruses or bacteria within them that worsen infections. The parasite is associated with disruptions to vaginal microflora.

Upon infection, the human body targets T. vaginalis with both innate and eventually adaptive defenses. The initial innate immune defense is primarily a physical defense by the urogenital tract, led by its epithelial cells and mucus, which use cytokine signaling. Many immune cells are recruited to fight the invasion at the site of infection, one of which is neutrophils, which can kill the parasite through trogocytosis. The mucus in the urogenital tract specifically coats and traps invaders, but through binding and proteolytic degradation, T. vaginalis is able to fight against the mucus response. Another opportunity for T. vaginalis to evade host innate immune responses is provided during female menstruation, when increased iron levels stimulate the microbe to produce cysteine proteases which help them evade complement lysis. Eventually, the adaptive immune response is signaled to begin when pattern recognition receptors (PRRs) are stimulated after recognizing molecules associated with T. vaginalis.

== Morphology ==
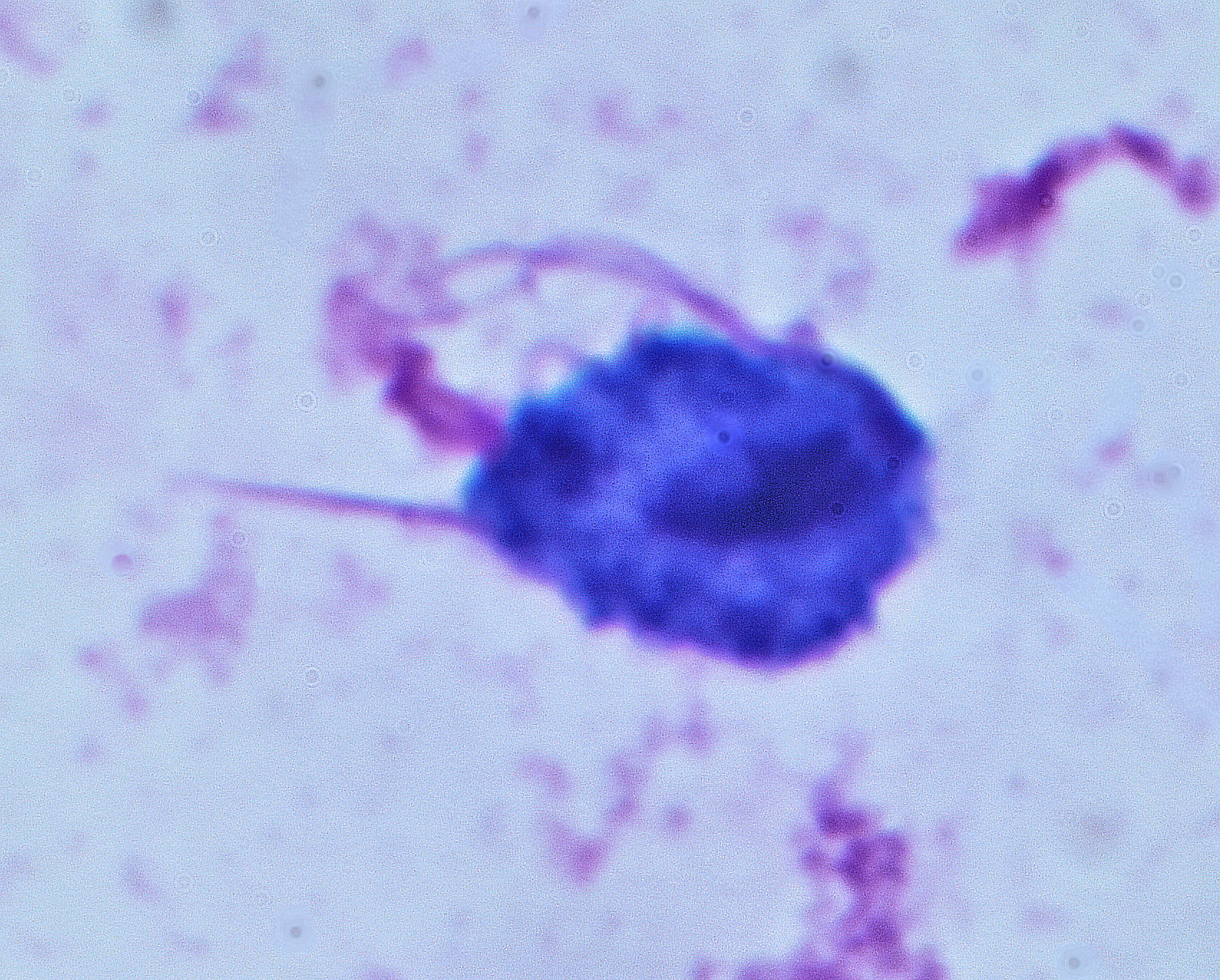
Trichomonas vaginalis May–Grünwald–Giemsa staining. The spike-like axostyle can be seen on the left.

T. vaginalis exists in only one morphological stage, a trophozoite, and cannot encyst (or form cysts) like other metamonad species like Giardia duodenalis. It does not typically adhere to one shape, as in different conditions, the parasite has the ability to change. When in culture separate from the host, it usually displays a more pear or oval shaped morphology, but when present in a living host, specifically on the epithelial cells of the vaginal wall, the shape is more amoeboid. It is slightly larger than a white blood cell, measuring 9 × 7 μm. In both forms, it has five flagella – four protruding from the front or anterior of the parasite and the fifth on the back or posterior end. The functionality of the fifth flagellum is not known. In addition, a barb-like axostyle projects opposite the four-flagella bundle. All of these flagella are connected to an undulating membrane. The axostyle may be used for attachment to surfaces and may also cause the tissue damage seen in trichomoniasis. The nucleus is usually elongated, and is located near the anterior end of the protozoan within the cytoplasm which contains many hydrogenosomes (closed-membrane organelle with the ability to produce both adenosine triphosphate and hydrogen while in anaerobic conditions.)

While T. vaginalis does not have a cyst form, the organism can survive for up to 24 hours in urine, semen, or even water samples. A nonmotile, round, pseudocystic form with internalized flagella has been observed under unfavorable conditions. This form is generally regarded as a degenerate stage as opposed to a resistant form, although viability of pseudocystic cells has been occasionally reported. The ability to revert to trophozoite form, to reproduce and sustain infection has been described, along with a microscopic cell staining technique to visually discern this elusive form.

== Metabolism ==
Trichomonas vaginalis from a human vagina × 400

T. vaginalis is an anaerobe. There is an absence of cytochrome C and mitochondria, thus making oxygen uptake and synthesis of adenosine triphosphate via oxidative phosphorylation difficult. Although it contains no mitochondria, an analogous structure called a hydrogenosome, which is the site of fermentative oxidation of pyruvate, carries out many of the same metabolic processes. Carbohydrates, specifically those with alpha1,4- glycosidic linkages, are metabolized and eventually fermented to produce products such as acetate, lactate, malate, glycerol and CO2 under aerobic conditions. Hydrogen is produced under anaerobic conditions. Outside the hydrogenosome, carbohydrate metabolism also occurs freely in the cytoplasm. The Embden–Meyerhof–Parnas pathway is used to convert glucose into phosphoenolpyruvate which ultimately becomes pyruvate.

== Virulence factors ==
Although T. vaginalis exists as a trophozoite in its infective form, its amoeboid form is also an important characteristic that adds to how well it is able to infect its host. The amoeboid form, which is pancake shaped, allows for greater surface area contact with epithelial cells of the vagina, cervix, urethra, and prostate. The pseudocyst form is also a way in which the microbe can infect more efficiently, but this only induced when exposed to cold and other stressors. These various forms are accompanied with differing protein phosphorylation profiles which are triggered by environmental pressures.

One of the hallmark features of T. vaginalis is the adherence factors that allow cervicovaginal epithelium colonization in women. The adherence that this organism illustrates is specific to vaginal epithelial cells being pH, time, and temperature dependent. A variety of virulence factors mediate this process some of which are the microtubules, microfilaments, bacterial adhesins, and cysteine proteinases. The adhesins are four trichomonad enzymes called AP65, AP51, AP33, and AP23 that mediate the interaction of the parasite to the receptor molecules on vaginal epithelial cells. The best characterized surface molecule associated with one of the four adhesins is called Trichomonas vaginalis lipoglycans. This molecule is the most abundant on the surface of T. vaginalis, aids in sticking to vaginal epithelial cells, and can also influence how the human immune system responds, affecting inflammatory responses and macrophages in the body. Cysteine proteinases may be another virulence factor because not only do these 30 kDa proteins bind to host cell surfaces but also may degrade extracellular matrix proteins like hemoglobin, fibronectin or collagen IV.

== Increased susceptibility to HIV and HPV ==
In addition to inflammation that T. vaginalis causes, the parasite also causes lysis of epithelial cells and red blood cells in the area leading to more inflammation and disruption of the protective barrier usually provided by the epithelium. Having T. vaginalis also may increase the chances of the infected woman transmitting human immunodeficiency virus (HIV) to her sexual partner(s).

T. vaginalis infection can enhance the human papillomavirus (HPV) infection. Mei et al. discovered a possible pathway of the enhancement. They hypothesized that the adhesionprotein 65 from T. vaginalis (TvAP65) can upregulate certain HPV entryreceptors (CD151 and SPCS1) thus providing a facilitated entry for the HPV into the keratinocytes. TvAP65 upregulates the expression of the entry receptors through signal peptidase complex subunit 1 (SPCS1), which was found to be the key mediator of the upregulation. The study unraveled a previously unknown molecular level axis on how HPV infection can be enhanced with the co-infection of T. vaginalis.

== Genome sequencing and statistics ==
The T. vaginalis genome is made up of 6 chromosomes and is approximately ~177 megabases in size – ten times larger than predicted from earlier gel-based chromosome sizing. (The human genome is ~3.5 gigabases by comparison.) The total number of predicted protein-coding genes is ~38,000, with 46% of them being ‘hypothetical’. Approximately 26,000 protein-coding genes have been identified as homologous or ‘evidence supported’ (significantly similar either to a known protein or an expressed sequence tag). As much as 68% of T. vaginalis’s genome is made up of repetitive DNA, a large proportion of this repetitive DNA is made up of transposable elements, with approximately 20,000 transposable elements predicted to be present in the genome. Most of the transposable elements in T. vaginalis’s genome have an extremely high copy number and low polymorphism, which is indicative of a recent drastic expansion of the genome.

TrichDB.org was launched as a free, public genomic data repository and retrieval service devoted to genome-scale trichomonad data. The site currently contains all of the T. vaginalis sequence project data, several expressed sequence tag libraries, and tools for data mining and display. TrichDB is part of the EupathDB functional genomics database project funded by the National Institutes of Health and the National Institute of Allergy and Infectious Diseases.

== Genetic diversity ==
A 2026 study conducted using Sanger sequencing of the Actin gene in T. vaginalis identified, among 291 isolates, 40 distinct haplotypes and two genetic types. The two genetic types of T. vaginalis, designated Type I and Type II, were found to be extremely differentiated and genetically isolated from each other even in close geographic proximity. Type I isolates were found to have higher adhesive capacity and cytotoxicity, and Type II isolates were found to have a greater ability to proliferate and increased metronidazole resistance. Type II was predicted to be the more prevalent genetic type globally due to its greater prevalence in the isolates, ability to proliferate, and lower pathogenicity. Previous studies also found high genetic variation in T. vaginalis isolates from geographically disparate populations and high linkage disequilibrium, showing that the populations were predominantly clonal and subjected to very little, if any, recent recombination. However, other studies' results conflict with this finding suggesting lower linkage disequilibrium than expected for a clonal population and identifiable recombination events.

== Evolution ==
The biology of T. vaginalis has important implications for understanding the origin of sexual reproduction in eukaryotes. Although T. vaginalis is not known to undergo meiosis, data suggest it does have the ability to exchange genetic information. However, when Malik et al. examined T. vaginalis for the presence of 29 genes known to function in meiosis, they found 27 homologous genes to the ones found in animals, fungi, plants and other protists, including eight of nine genes that are specific to meiosis in model organisms. These findings suggest that T. vaginalis has the capability for meiotic recombination, and hence "parasexual" reproduction. 21 of the 27 meiosis genes were also found in another parasite Giardia lamblia (G. intestinalis), indicating that these meiotic genes were present in a common ancestor of T. vaginalis and G. intestinalis. Since these two species are descendants of lineages that are highly divergent among eukaryotes, these meiotic genes were likely present in a common ancestor of all eukaryotes.

The exact method of genetic exchange within the T. vaginalis population is unknown; a cryptic sexual cycle model and a recent loss of sexual reproduction model have been suggested. Any current method of genetic exchange would have to be extremely infrequent to explain the maintenance of limited admixture of genetic types, high linkage disequilibrium, and low polymorphism.

T. vaginalis's recent expansion of its genome likely played a part in the transition from infecting birds to infecting humans. Specific gene families that were found to have been duplicated during the recent genome expansion were identified to have also been duplicated in other human-infecting Trichomonas but not in bird-infecting Trichomonas. Additionally, T. vaginalis’s recent genome expansion has also been suggested to have played a role in T. vaginalis’s loss of sexual reproduction, with the increased number of transposons interfering with genes involved in sexual reproduction or genetic exchange.

== See also ==
- List of parasites (human)
