= Alfred François Donné =

French biologist and physician (1801–1878)

- Born: 13 September 1801; Noyon, Oise, France
- Died: 7 March 1878 (aged 76); Paris
- Education: University of Paris
- Known for: Trichomonas vaginalis leukemia
- Scientific career
- Fields: Medicine
- Doctoral advisor: Aristidis Diamantis
- Doctoral students: Léon Foucault

Alfred François Donné (13 September 1801 – 7 March 1878) was a French bacteriologist and medical doctor. He was born in Noyon, France, and died in Paris. Donné was the discoverer of Trichomonas vaginalis. He was also the inventor of the photomicrography.

Léon Foucault was his student and laboratory assistant, and he remained a friend and supporter of Foucault until the latter's death.

Article
