= Histomoniasis =

- Other names: Histomonosis, blackhead disease
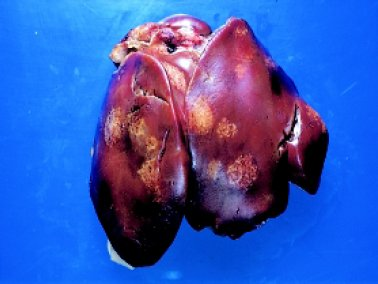
- Large, pale areas in the liver of a bird infected with Histomonas meleagridis
- Specialty: Veterinary medicine

Histomoniasis is a commercially significant disease of poultry, particularly of chickens and turkeys, due to parasitic infection of a protozoan, Histomonas meleagridis. The protozoan is transmitted to the bird by the nematode parasite Heterakis gallinarum. H. meleagridis resides within the eggs of H. gallinarum, so birds ingest the parasites along with contaminated soil or food. Earthworms can also act as a paratenic host.

Histomonas meleagridis specifically infects the cecum and liver. Symptoms of the infection include lethargy, reduced appetite, poor growth, increased thirst, sulphur-yellow diarrhoea and dry, ruffled feathers. The head may become cyanotic (bluish in colour), hence the common name of the disease, blackhead disease; thus the name 'blackhead' is in all possibility a misnomer for discoloration. The disease carries a high mortality rate, and is particularly highly fatal in poultry, and less in other birds. Currently, no prescription drug is approved to treat this disease.

Poultry (especially free-ranging) and wild birds commonly harbor a number of parasitic worms with only mild health problems from them. Turkeys are much more susceptible to getting blackhead than are chickens. Thus, chickens can be infected carriers for a long time because they are not removed or medicated by their owners, and they do not die or stop eating/defecating. H. gallinarum eggs can remain infective in soil for four years, a high risk of transmitting blackhead to turkeys remains if they graze areas with chicken feces in this time frame.

== Symptoms ==
Symptoms appear within 7–12 days after infection and include depression, reduced appetite, poor growth, increased thirst, sulphur-yellow diarrhoea, listlessness, drooping wings, and unkempt feathers. Young birds have a more acute disease and die within a few days after signs appear. Older birds may be sick for some time and become emaciated before death. The symptoms are highly fatal to turkeys, but effect less damage in chickens. However, outbreaks in chickens may result in high morbidity, moderate mortality, and extensive culling, leading to overall poor flock performance. Concurrence of Salmonella typhmurium and E. coli was found to cause high mortality in broiler chickens.

== Cause ==
A protozoan H. meleagridis is responsible for histomoniasis of gallinaceous birds ranging from chickens, turkeys, ducks, geese, grouse, guineafowl, partridges, pheasants, and quails. The protozoan parasite is transmitted through the eggs of a nematode, Heterakis gallinarum. The eggs are highly resistant to environmental conditions, and H. meleagridis is, in turn, highly viable inside the eggs, even for years. Birds are infected once they ingest the eggs of the nematode in soil, or sometimes through earthworms which had ingested the egg-contaminated soil. Outbreak can occur rapidly from the heavily infected bird in a flock readily through normal contact between uninfected and infected birds and their droppings in the total absence of cecal worms. For this reason, infection can spread very quickly. Once inside the digestive system of the host, the protozoan is moved to the cecum along with the eggs of H. gallinarum.

=== Transmission and pathology ===
The disease causing agent, Histomonas meliagridis, is transmitted in the eggs of the worm Heterakis gallinarum. Once in the environment, the eggs are carried by earthworms. When the worms are eaten and the eggs hatch in the ceca, the pathogen is released. Bird to bird transmission can also occur from cloacal drinking

Visible signs of this disease are cyanosis of the head (hence, “blackhead”) and sulfur-yellow diarrhea. The pathogen causes lesions on the ceca and the liver. The ceca experience ulcerations, enlargement, and caseous masses start to form inside of them. The liver develops round, haemorrhagic, 1-2 centimeter oci that have caseous cores.

== Diagnosis ==
Histomoniasis is characterized by blackhead in birds. H. meleagridis is released in the cecum where the eggs of the nematode undergo larval development. The parasite migrates to the mucosa and submucosa where they cause extensive and severe necrosis of the tissue. Necrosis is initiated by inflammation and gradual ulceration, causing thickening of the cecal wall. The lesions are sometimes exacerbated by other pathogens such as Escherichia coli and coccidia. Histomonads then gain entry into small veins of the blood stream from the cecal lesions and migrate to the liver, causing focal necrosis. Turkeys are noted to be most susceptible to the symptoms in terms of mortality, sometimes approaching 100% of a flock. Diagnosis can be easily performed by necropsy of the fresh or preserved carcass. Unusual lesions have been observed in other organs of turkey such as the bursa of Fabricius, lungs, and kidneys.

== Prevention and treatment ==
Currently, no therapeutic drugs are prescribed for the disease. Therefore, prevention is the sole mode of treatment. This disease can be prevented only by quarantining sick birds and preventing migration of birds around the house, causing them to spread the disease. Deworming of birds with anthelmintics can reduce exposure to the cecal nematodes that carry the protozoan. Good management of the farm, including immediate quarantine of infected birds and sanitation, is the main useful strategy for controlling the spread of the parasitic contamination. The only drug used for the control (prophylaxis) in the United States is (nitarsone) at 0.01875% of feed until 5 days before marketing. Natustat and nitarsone were shown to be effective therapeutic drugs. As of the end of 2015, the FDA has proscribed arsenical drugs in poultry in the US. Nifurtimox, a compound with known antiprotozoal activity, was demonstrated to be significantly effective at 300–400 ppm, and well tolerated by turkeys.

== History ==
The disease was initially discovered in Rhode Island in the year 1893. Soon after, it was shown to have devastating effects on the turkey industry, especially in New England, dropping production from 11 million birds in 1890 to 6.6 million in 1900. However, improvements in turkey management have curbed the effects of this disease. It has since spread across the globe. It has been found in turkeys, chickens, guinea fowl, and other game birds. Bobwhite quail can also be infected.
