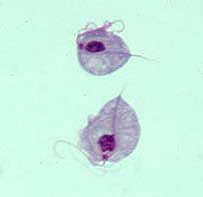
- Two trophozoites of Trichomonas vaginalis stained with Giemsa

Scientific classification
- Domain: Eukaryota
- Clade: Metamonada
- Phylum: Parabasalia
- Class: Trichomonadea
- Order: Trichomonadida
- Family: Trichomonadidae

Genera
- Cochlosoma; Lacusteria; Pentatrichomonas; Pentatrichomonoides; Pseudotrypanosoma; Tetratrichomonas; Trichomitopsis; Trichomonas

= Trichomonadidae =

Family of protists

Trichomonadidae is a family of anaerobic protozoa. Many of its members are parasitic, causing disease in humans or domestic animals.
