= Heterakidae =

Scientific classification
- Kingdom: Animalia
- Phylum: Nematoda
- Class: Chromadorea
- Order: Rhabditida
- Suborder: Spirurina
- Infraorder: Ascaridomorpha
- Superfamily: Heterakoidea
- Family: Heterakidae; Railliet & Henry, 1912

Family of roundworms

Heterakidae is a family of nematodes belonging to the order Rhabditida.

== Genera ==
Genera:

- Africana Travassos, 1920
- Bufonerakis Baker, 1980
- Cagourakis Petter, Chermette & Vassart, 1988
- Haroldakis Inglis, 1991
- Hatterianema Chabaud & Dollfus, 1966
- Heterakis Dujardin, 1845
- Kiwinema Inglis & Harris, 1990
- Meteterakis Karve, 1930
- Moaciria Teixeira de Freitas, 1956
- Musserakis Hasegawa, Dewi & Asakawa, 2014-04
- Neoheterakis Kumar & Thienpont, 1974
- Odontoterakis Skrjabin & Schikhobalova, 1947
- Pseudostrongyluris Guerrero, 1971
- Spinicauda Travassos, 1920
- Strongyluris Müller, 1894
