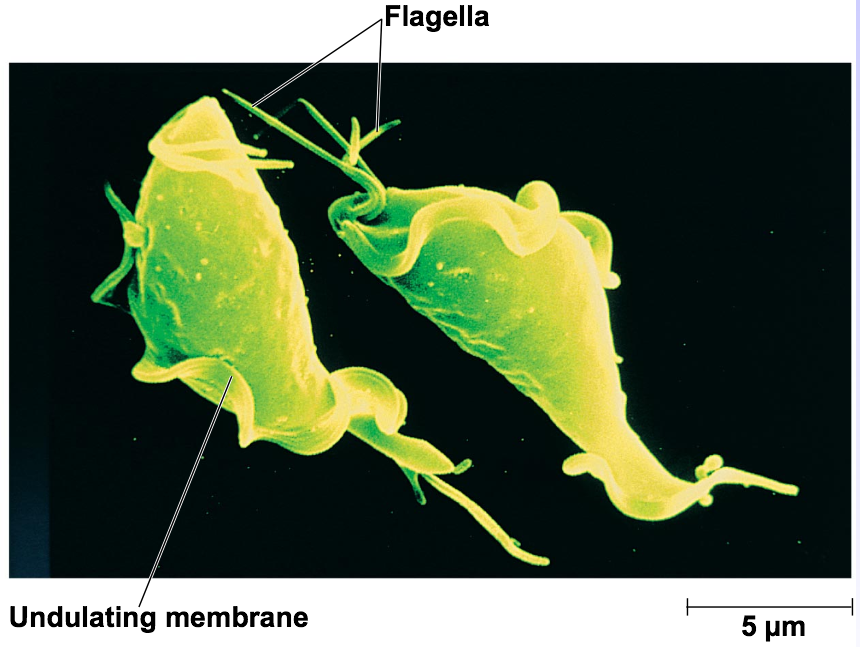
- Two T. vaginalis trophozoites. Colorized SEM

Scientific classification
- Domain: Eukaryota
- Supergroup: Metamonada
- Phylum: Parabasalia
- Class: Trichomonadea
- Order: Trichomonadida; Brugerolle & Lee 2000

Families
- Calonymphidae; Cochlosomatidae; Devescovinidae; Monocercomonadidae; Trichomonadidae

= Trichomonadida =

Order of flagellated protists

Trichomonadida is an order of anaerobic protists, included with the parabasalids. Members of this order are referred to as trichomonads.

Some organisms in this order include:

- Trichomonas vaginalis, an organism living inside the vagina of humans
- Dientamoeba fragilis, parasitic ameboid in humans
- Histomonas meleagridis, parasite that causes blackhead disease in poultry
- Mixotricha paradoxa, a symbiotic organism inside termites, host of endosymbionts
- Simplicimonas similis, a parasite originally described from a gecko

== Anatomy ==
Species in this order typically have four to six flagella at the cell's apical pole, one of which is recurrent - that is, it runs along a surface wave, giving the aspect of an undulating membrane. Like other parabasalids, they typically have an axostyle, a pelta, a costa, and parabasal bodies. In Histomonas only one flagellum and a reduced axostyle are found, and in Dientamoeba, both are absent.

== Behavior ==
Most species are either parasites or other endosymbionts of animals.

Trichomonads reproduce by a special form of longitudinal fission, leading to large numbers of trophozoites in a relatively short time. Cysts never form, so transmission from one host to another is always based on direct contact between the sites they occupy.

== Treatment ==
The preferred treatment for trichomonad infection is metronidazole.
