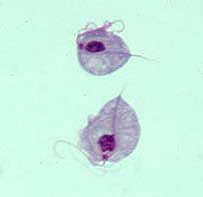
- Two trophozoites of Trichomonas vaginalis stained with Giemsa

Scientific classification
- Domain: Eukaryota
- Supergroup: Metamonada
- Phylum: Parabasalia; Honigberg 1973

Orders
- Trichomonadida; Cristamonadida; Spirotrichonymphida; Trichonymphida

= Parabasalid =

Group of flagellated protists

The parabasalids are a group of flagellated protists within the supergroup Excavata. Most of these eukaryotic organisms form a symbiotic relationships with animals. These include a variety of forms found in the intestines of termites and cockroaches, many of which have symbiotic bacteria that help them digest cellulose in woody plants. Other species within this supergroup are known parasites and include human pathogens.

== Characteristics ==
The flagella are arranged in one or more clusters near the anterior of the cell. Their basal bodies are linked to parabasal fibers that are associated with a prominent Golgi complex, together forming a parabasal apparatus distinctive to the group. Attachment of a parabasal fiber to the first Golgi cisterna by thin filaments has been reported in Tritrichomonas foetus. Usually they also give rise to a sheet of cross-like microtubules that runs down the center of the cell and in some cases projects past the end. This is called the axostyle, but is different in structure from the axostyles of oxymonads.

Parabasalids are anaerobic, and lack mitochondria, but this is now known to be a result of secondary loss, and they contain small hydrogenosomes which apparently developed from reduced mitochondria. Similar relics have been found in other amitochondriate flagellates, and the parabasalids are probably related to them, forming a group called the metamonads. They lack the feeding grooves found in most others, but this is probably a secondary loss as well.

Representation of a Parabasalid: 1. Anterior flagellum; 2. Recurrent flagellum; 3. Undulating membrane; 4. Basal bodies; 5. Golgi apparatus; modifies proteins and sends them out of the cell; 6. Nucleus; 7. Costa, a striated fiber associated with the undulating membrane; 8. Pelta, made of microtubules and creates cell structure; 9. Parabasal fibre; 10. Axostyle, may be involved in movement or support for the cell; 11. Endoplasmic reticulum, the transport network for molecules going to specific parts of the cell; 12. Vacuole; 13. Hydrogenosome, produces molecular hydrogen and ATP (energy) in anaerobic conditions; 14. Lysosome, holds enzymes

== Classification ==
Before reclassification, the parabasalids were divided into about seven to 10 orders depending on sources. Present classification divides Parabasalia into four orders, that is, Trichonymphida, Spirotrichonymphida, Cristamonadida, and Trichomonadida.

- The trichomonads have one group of 4–6 flagella, one of which is attached to the side of the cell and often forms an undulating membrane. Many are found in vertebrate hosts, including Trichomonas vaginalis, which causes a sexually transmitted disease in humans.
- The other orders, formerly grouped as the hypermastigids, have a large number of flagellar clusters and are found exclusively in the guts of insects. (The term "Hypermastigida" is still occasionally encountered.)

== Evolution ==
The parabasalid Trichomonas vaginalis is not known to undergo meiosis. However, Malik et al. examined T. vaginalis for the presence of 29 genes that function in meiosis and found 27 such genes, including eight genes specific to meiosis in model organisms. These findings suggested that the capability for meiosis, and hence sexual reproduction, was likely present in a recent parabasalid ancestor of T. vaginalis.
