= Two-domain system =

Biological classification system

The tree of life. Two domains of life are Bacteria (top branches) and Archaea (bottom branches, including eukaryotes).

The two-domain system is a biological classification system that groups all cellular organisms in the tree of life into two domains: Archaea and Bacteria, while eukaryotes are considered a specialized clade under Archaea. It emerged from increasingly developed knowledge of archaean diversity and challenges the widely accepted three-domain system, which classifies cellular life into three domains: Bacteria, Archaea and Eukarya.

The two-domain system was preceded by the eocyte hypothesis proposed by James A. Lake in the 1980s, which was largely superseded by the three-domain system due to inadequate evidence at the time. Better understanding of archaean biology, especially of their roles in the origin of eukaryotes through symbiogenesis with endosymbiont α-proteobacteria (which evolved into mitochondria), led to the revival of the eocyte hypothesis in the 2000s. The two-domain system became more widely accepted after the discovery of a large kingdom of deep-sea archaea called Promethearchaeati (a.k.a. "Asgard archaea") in 2017, which evidence suggests to be the evolutionary root of eukaryotes, thereby making eukaryotes members of the domain Archaea.

While the features of promethearchaea do not completely rule out the three-domain system, the notion that eukaryotes originated within Archaea has been strengthened by genetic and proteomic studies. Under the three-domain system, Eukarya is mainly distinguished by the presence of "eukaryotic signature proteins" that are not found in Archaea and Bacteria. However, promethearchaea contain genes that code for multiple such proteins.

== Background ==
Classification of life into two main divisions is not a new concept, with the first such proposal by French biologist Édouard Chatton in 1938. Chatton distinguished organisms into:

1. Procaryotes (including bacteria)
2. Eucaryotes (including protozoans)

While he coined the terms in 1925, his detailed classification was published in a limited circulation format in 1938, titled Titres et Travaux Scientifiques (1906–1937) de Edouard Chatton. These were later named empires, and Chatton's classification as the two-empire system. Chatton used the name Eucaryotes only for protozoans, excluded other eukaryotes, and published in limited circulation so that his work was not recognised. His classification was rediscovered by Canadian bacteriologist Roger Yates Stanier of while at the Pasteur Institute in Paris. The next year, Stanier and his colleague Cornelis Bernardus van Niel published in Archiv für Mikrobiologie (now Archives of Microbiology) Chatton's classification with Eucaryotes eloborated to include higher algae, protozoans, fungi, plants, and animals. It became a popular system of classification, as John O. Corliss wrote in 1986: "[The] Chatton-Stanier concept of a kingdom (better, superkingdom) Prokaryota for bacteria (in the broadest sense) and a second superkingdom Eukaryota for all other organisms has been widely accepted with enthusiasm."

In 1977, Carl Woese and George E. Fox classified prokaryotes into two groups (kingdoms), Archaebacteria (for methanogens, the first known archaea) and Eubacteria, based on their 16S ribosomal RNA (16S rRNA) genes. In 1984, James A. Lake, Michael W. Clark, Eric Henderson, and Melanie Oakes of the University of California, Los Angeles described what was known as "a group of sulfur-dependent bacteria" as a new group of organisms called eocytes (for "dawn cells") and created a new kingdom Eocyta. With it they proposed the existence of four kingdoms, based on the structure and composition of the ribosomal subunits, namely Archaebacteria, Eubacteria, Eukaryote and Eocyta Lake further analysed the rRNA sequences of the four groups and suggested that eukaryotes originated from eocytes, and not archaebacteria, as was generally assumed. This was the basis of the eocyte hypothesis. In 1988, he proposed the division of all life forms into two taxonomic groups:

1. Karyotes (that include eukaryotes and proto-eukaryotic organisms such as eocytes)
2. Parkaryotes (Note: not to be confused with parakaryote) (that consist of eubacteria and archaea such as halobacteria and methanogens)

In 1990, Woese, Otto Kandler, and Mark Wheelis showed that archaea are a distinct group of organisms and that eocytes (renamed Crenarchaeota as a phylum of Archaea but corrected as Thermoproteota in 2021) are Archaea. They introduced the major division of life into the three-domain system comprising domain Eucarya, domain Bacteria, and domain Archaea. With a number of revisions of details and discoveries of several new archaea lineages, Woese's classification gradually gained acceptance as "arguably the best-developed and most widely-accepted scientific hypotheses [with the five-kingdom classification] regarding the evolutionary history of life."

The three-domain concept did not, however, resolve the issues with the relationship between Archaea and eukaryotes. As Ford Doolittle, then at the Dalhousie University, put it in 2020: "[The] three-domain tree wrongly represents evolutionary relationships, presenting a misleading view about how eukaryotes evolved from prokaryotes. The three-domain tree does recognize a specific archaeal–eukaryotic affinity, but it would have the latter arising independently, not from within, the former."

== Concept ==
The two-domain system relies mainly on two key concepts that define eukaryotes as members of the domain Archaea and not as a separate domain: eukaryotes originated within Archaea, and promethearchaea represent the origin of eukaryotes.

=== Eukaryotes evolved from archaea ===
The three-domain system presumes that eukaryotes are more closely related to archaea than to Bacteria and are sister group to Archaea, thus, it treats them as separate domain. As more new archaea were discovered in the early 2000s, this distinction became doubtful as eukaryotes became deeply nested within Archaea. The origin of eukaryotes from Archaea, meaning the two are of the same larger group, came to be supported by studies based on ribosome protein sequencing and phylogenetic analyses in 2004. Phylogenomic analysis of about 6000 gene sets from 185 bacterial, archaeal, and eukaryotic genomes in 2007 also suggested the origin of eukaryotes from Methanobacteriota (specifically the Thermoplasmatales).

In 2008, researchers from Natural History Museum, London and Newcastle University reported a comprehensive analysis of 53 genes from archaea, bacteria, and eukaryotes that included essential components of the nucleic acid replication, transcription, and translation machineries. The conclusion was that eukaryotes evolved from archaea, specifically Crenarchaeota (eocytes) and the results "favor a topology that supports the eocyte hypothesis rather than archaebacterial monophyly and the 3-domains tree of life." A study around the same time also found several genes common to eukaryotes and Crenarchaeota. These accumulating evidences support the two-domain system.

In 2019, research led by Gergely J. Szöllősi assistant professor at ELTE has also concluded that two domains are the correct system. The studies conducted used simulations of more than 3,000 gene families. The study concluded that eukaryotes probably evolved from a bacterium entering a Promethearchaeati host (probably from the phylum Heimdallarchaeota).

One of the distinctions of the domain Eukarya in the three-domain system is that eukaryotes have unique proteins such as actin (cytoskeletal microfilament involved in cell motility), tubulin (component of the large cytoskeleton, microtubule), and the ubiquitin system (protein degradation and recycling) that are not found in prokaryotes. However, these so-called "eukaryotic signature proteins" are encoded in genomes of Thermoproteati (comprising the phyla Thaumarchaeota, Aigarchaeota, Crenarchaeota and Korarchaeota) archaea, but not encoded in other archaea genomes. The first eukaryotic proteins identified in Crenarchaeota were actin and actin-related proteins (Arp) 2 and 3, perhaps explaining the origin of eukaryotes by symbiogenic phagocytosis, in which an ancient archaeal host had an actin-based mechanism by which to envelop other cells, like protomitochondrial bacteria.

Tubulin-like proteins named artubulins are found in the genomes of several ammonium-oxidising Thaumarchaeota. Homologs for a unique class of endosomal sorting complexes required for transport (ESCRT) involved in eukaryotic cell division, known as ESCRT-III, are found in all Thermoproteati groups. The ESCRT-III-like proteins constitute the primary cell division system in these archaea. Genes encoding the ubiquitin system are known from multiple genomes of Aigarchaeota. Ubiquitin-related protein called Urm1 is also present in Crenarchaeota. DNA replication system (GINS proteins) in Crenarchaeota and Halobacteria are similar to the CMG (CDC45, MCM, GINS) complex of eukaryotes. The presence of these eukaryotic proteins in Archaea indicates their direct relationship and that eukaryotes emerged from Archaea.

=== Promethearchaea are the last eukaryotic common ancestor ===
The discovery of Promethearchaeati, described as "eukaryote-like archaea", in 2012 and the following phylogenetic analyses have strengthened the two-domain view of life. Promethearchaea called Lokiarchaeota contain even more eukaryotic protein-genes than the Thermoproteati kingdom. Initial genetic analysis and later reanalysis showed that out of over 31 selected eukaryotic genes in the archaea, 75% of them directly support eukaryote-archaea grouping, meaning a single domain of Archaea including eukaryotes; although the findings did not completely rule out the three-domain system.

As more Promethearchaeati groups were subsequently discovered including Thorarchaeota, Odinarchaeota, and Heimdallarchaeota, their relationships with eukaryotes became better established. Phylogenetic analyses using ribosomal RNA genes indicated that eukaryotes stemmed from promethearchaea, and that Heimdallarchaeota are the closest relatives of eukaryotes. Eukaryotic origin from Heimdallarchaeota is also supported by phylogenomic study in 2020. A new group of Promethearchaeati found in 2021 (provisionally named Wukongarchaeota) also indicated a deep root for eukaryotic origin. A report in 2022 of another Promethearchaeati, named Njordarchaeota, indicates that Heimdallarchaeota-Wukongarchaeota branch is possibly the origin group for eukaryotes.

The promethearchaea contain at least 80 genes for eukaryotic signature proteins. In addition to actin, tubulin, ubiquitin, and ESCRT proteins found in Thermoproteati archaea, promethearchaea contain functional genes for several other eukaryotic proteins such as profilins, ubiquitin system (E1-like, E2-like and small-RING finger (srfp) proteins), membrane-trafficking systems (such as Sec23/24 and TRAPP domains), a variety of small GTPases (including Gtr/Rag family GTPase orthologues), and gelsolins. Although this information do not completely resolve the three-domain and two-domain controversies, they are generally considered to favour the two-domain system.

== Classification ==
The two-domain system defines classification of all known cellular life forms into two domains: Bacteria and Archaea. It overrides the domain Eukaryota recognised in the three-domain classification as one of the main domains. In contrast to the eocyte hypothesis, which proposed two major groups of life (similar to domains) and posited that Archaea could be divided to both bacterial and eukaryotic groups, it merged Archaea and eukaryotes into a single domain, Bacteria entirely in a separate domain.

=== Domain Bacteria ===
It consists of all bacteria, which are prokaryotes (lacking nucleus), thus, Domain Bacteria is made up solely of prokaryotic organisms. Some examples are:

- Cyanobacteriota – photosynthesising bacteria related to the plastids of eukaryotes.
- Spirochaetota – Gram-negative bacteria involved in human diseases like syphilis and lyme disease.
- Actinomycetota – Gram-positive bacteria including Streptomyces species from which several antibiotics are derived including streptomycin, neomycin, bottromycins and chloramphenicol.

=== Domain Archaea ===
It comprises both prokaryotic and eukaryotic organisms.

Archaea

Archaea are prokaryotic organisms, some examples are:

- All methanogens – which produce the gas methane.
- Most halophiles – which live in very salty water.
- Most thermoacidophiles – which live in acidic high-temperature water.

Eukarya

Eukaryotes have a nucleus in their cells, and include:

- Protists – many unicellular eukaryotes including malarial parasites, amoeba, and diatoms.
- Kingdom Fungi – eukaryotes such as mushroom, yeast, and mould; all fungi.
- Kingdom Plantae – all plants.
- Kingdom Animalia – all animals.

== See also ==
- Two-empire system
- Three-domain system
- Domain (biology)
