= Schizophyte =

Schizophyte was a botanical classification proposed by Ferdinand Cohn to describe the class of primitive "plants" that reproduce solely by fission. It has been considered synonymous with the Protophyta of Sachs and the Monera of Haeckel. In modern taxonomy, it is equivalent with the concept of prokaryotes, single-celled microorganisms with no nucleus or other membrane-bound organelles, now divided into the domains Bacteria and Archaea.
