= Eocyte hypothesis =

Hypothesis in evolutionary biology

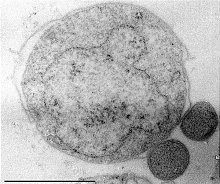
Ignicoccus hospitalis (and its symbiote Nanoarchaeum equitans)

The eocyte hypothesis in evolutionary biology proposes that the eukaryotes originated from a group of prokaryotes called eocytes (later classified as Thermoproteota, a group of archaea). After his team at the University of California, Los Angeles discovered eocytes in 1984, James A. Lake formulated the hypothesis as "eocyte tree" that proposed eukaryotes as part of archaea. Lake hypothesised the tree of life as having only two primary branches: prokaryotes, which include Bacteria and Archaea, and karyotes, that comprise Eukaryotes and eocytes. Parts of this early hypothesis were revived in a newer two-domain system of biological classification which named the primary domains as Archaea and Bacteria.

Lake's hypothesis was based on an analysis of the structural components of ribosomes. It was largely ignored, being overshadowed by the three-domain system which relied on more precise genetic analysis. In 1990, Carl Woese and his colleagues proposed that cellular life consists of three domains—Eucarya, Bacteria, and Archaea – based on the ribosomal RNA sequences. The three-domain concept was widely accepted in genetics, and became the presumptive classification system for high-level taxonomy, and was promulgated in many textbooks.

Resurgence of archaea research after the 2000s, using advanced genetic techniques, and later discoveries of new groups of archaea revived the eocyte hypothesis; consequently, the two-domain system of Archaea and Bacteria has found wider acceptance.

== Description ==
In 1984, James A. Lake, Michael W. Clark, Eric Henderson, and Melanie Oakes of the University of California, Los Angeles described a new group of prokaryotic organisms designated as "a group of sulfur-dependent bacteria." Based on the structure and composition of their ribosomal subunits, they found that these organisms were different from other prokaryotes, bacteria and archaea, known at the time. They named them eocytes (for "dawn cells") and proposed a new biological kingdom Eocyta. According to this discovery, the tree of life is represented by four kingdoms, Archaebacteria, Eubacteria, Eukaryote and Eocyta.

Following analyses of the rRNA sequences of the four groups, Lake concluded in 1988 that eukaryotes were closely related to eocytes so that the two groups constitute the same (monophyletic) group, meaning that eukaryotes originated from eocytes and not archaebacteria, as was generally assumed. This was the establishment of the eocyte hypothesis. In 1988, Lake proposed a systematic classification of all life forms into two taxonomic groups, which he later mentioned as superkingdoms:

1. Karyotes (that include eukaryotes and proto-eukaryotic organisms such as eocytes)
2. Parkaryotes (that consists of eubacteria and two groups of archaea known at the time, halobacteria and methanogens)

== Development and competition ==
Lake's classification was not widely recognised, but the eocyte hypothesis gained considerable attention after its introduction due to the interest in determining the origin of the eukaryotic cell. However, the concept faced a problem because it was not known that eocytes, the main organism group on which the hypothesis was based, were archaea. For example, studies in the late 1980s and early 1990s still treated eocytes as separate group from archaea. As Lake also argued, the rival hypothesis was called archaebacterial tree (as introduced by Carl Woese of the University of Illinois in 1987) or archaebacterial theory, which (supposedly) stated that eukaryotes originated from archaea, and not eocytes.

Due to such confusion, some studies appeared to invalidate the hypothesis. For example, Japanese scientists reported in 1990 their study on the elongation factors Tu(EF-Tu) and G(EF-G) from various organisms that showed that eukaryotes are most closely related to archaea (methanogen and halobacteria), and not eocytes. Other studies also supported the eukaroyte-archaea relationship and rejected the eocyte hypotheses. Ribosomal RNA sequencing in 1989 also opposed the eocyte tree as the origin of eukaryotes.

=== Three-domain system ===
The most important blow to the eocyte hypothesis and Lake's classification was the development of ribosomal RNA sequencing that became a reliable determinant in biological classification. Introduced in 1977 by Carl Woese and George E. Fox in classification, the technique indicated that archaea (with only methanogens known at the time) and bacteria were distinct groups of organisms. Two kingdoms, Archaebacteria (archaea) and Eubacteria (for bacteria) were established. Based on further studies, Woese, Otto Kandler and Mark Wheelis introduced the concept of "domain" in 1990 as the highest level of biological classification, and proposed the three-domain system consisting of Eucarya, Bacteria and Archaea. With it they classified eocytes as archaea under the phylum Crenarchaeota (which was renamed Thermoproteota in 2021).

The classification gradually gained acceptance and was recognised as "arguably the best-developed and most widely-accepted scientific hypotheses [with the five-kingdom classification] regarding the evolutionary history of life." It became a scientific concept and general taxonomy in textbooks. Although Lake continued to advocate his eocyte taxonomy and hypothesis instead of conceding that eocytes were archaea, the hypothesis was largely neglected and support of it waned in favour of the three-domain system.

== Archaeal studies ==
In addition to a Thermoproteota origin of eukaryotes, some studies have suggested that eukaryotes may also have originated in the Nitrososphaerota (formerly Thaumarchaeota). A superphylum TACK has been proposed that includes the Nitrososphaerota, Thermoproteota, and other groups of archaea, so that this superphylum may be related to the origin of eukaryotes. It is seen that eukaryotes share a large number of proteins with members of the TACK superphylum and that these complex archaea may have had rudimentary phagocytosis abilities to engulf bacteria.

As a result of metagenomic analysis of material found nearby hydrothermal vents, another superphylum — Asgard — has been named and proposed to be more closely related to the original eukaryote and a sister group to TACK more recently. Asgard consists of phyla Lokiarchaeota (found first), Heimdallarchaeota (possibly related closest to eukaryotes) and others.

== Root of the eocyte tree ==
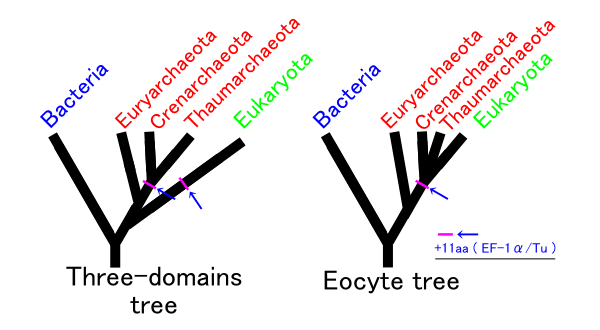
Schematic representation

The eocyte tree root may be located in the RNA world; that is, the root organism may have been a ribocyte (also known as a ribocell). For cellular DNA and DNA handling, an "out of virus" scenario has been proposed: storing genetic information in DNA may have been an innovation performed by viruses and later handed over to ribocytes twice, once transforming them into bacteria and once transforming them into archaea.

Although archaeal viruses are not as well-studied as bacterial phages, it is thought that dsDNA viruses led to the incorporation of the viral genome into archaeal genomes. The transduction of genetic material through a viral vector led to an increase in complexity in the pre-eukaryotic cells. All these findings do not change the eocyte tree as given here in principle, but examine a higher resolution of it.

== Arguments against ==
Due to the similarities found between eukaryotes and both archaea and bacteria, it is thought that a major source of the genetic variation is through horizontal gene transfer. Horizontal gene transfer explains why archaeal sequences are found in bacteria and bacterial sequences are found in archaea. This could explain why elongation factors found in archaea and eukaryotes are so similar, the data currently out is obscured as horizontal gene transfer, vertical gene transfer, or endosymbiosis and could be behind the gene sequence similarity. The eocyte hypothesis also has troubles due to the endosymbiotic theory, with the archaea being able to phagocytize bacteria for the formation of membrane-bound organelles. It is thought that these ancestral prokaryotes began to have ectosymbiotic relationships with other prokaryotes and gradually engulfed these symbiotes through cell membrane protrusions.

Although more recent data provides evidence in favour of the relationship between eukaryotes and Thermoproteota through the analysis of elongation factors, earlier experimentation with elongation factors provided evidence against such a relationship. Hasegawa et al. uses these elongation factors to show that eukaryotes and archaebacteria are more closely related than archaebacteria and eubacteria than is explained in this two-tree system.

== Competing hypothesis ==
A competing hypothesis is that prokaryotes evolved towards thriving in higher temperatures to evade viruses through the thermoreduction hypothesis, however this does not account for the arising of eukaryotes and only takes into consideration the prokaryotic origins. However decrease in complexity from a more complex origin is the basis of reductive evolution where a commensal relationship occurs, while this reduction explained in the thermoreduction hypothesis uses a parasitic relationship with viruses to explain the movement of complex pre-eukaryotes to a more harsh environment; that being ocean floor hydrothermal vents.

== Revival ==
=== Molecular studies ===
With advancements in genomics, the eocyte hypothesis experienced a revival beginning in the mid-2000s. As more archaeal genomes were sequenced, numerous genes coding for eukaryotic traits have been discovered in various archaean phyla, seemingly providing support for the eocyte hypothesis. Proteomics based research has also found supporting data with the use of elongation factor 1-α (eEF-1), a common housekeeping protein, to compare structural homology between eukaryotic and archaean lineages. Furthermore, other proteins have been sequenced through proteomics with homologous structures in heat shock proteins found in both eukaryotes and archaea. The structure of these heat shock proteins were identified through X-ray crystallography to find the three dimensional structure of the proteins. These proteins however have differing purposes as the eukaryote heat shock protein is a part of the T-complex while the archaeal heat shock protein is a molecular chaperone. This creates an issue with the sequence homology that has been seen between 70 kilodalton heat shock proteins in eukaryotes and Gram-negative bacteria.

Ribosome protein sequencing and phylogenetic analyses in 2004 showed that eukaryotes emerged from archaea. Phylogenomic analysis in 2007 also pointed to the origin of eukaryotes specifically from the Thermoplasmatales. The so-called "eukaryotic signature proteins" actin (cytoskeletal microfilament involved in cell motility), tubulin (component of the large cytoskeleton, microtubule), and the ubiquitin system (protein degradation and recycling), which are thought to be unique to eukaryotes, were found in TACK (comprising the phyla Thaumarchaeota, Aigarchaeota, Crenarchaeota and Korarchaeota) archaea but not in other archaea. These indicate that eukaryotes can be merged into archaea.

=== Discovery of Asgards ===
Asgard, described as "eukaryote-like archaea", were discovered in 2012. The first known Asgards called Lokiarchaeota contain more eukaryotic protein-genes than the TACK group that supported the merging of eukaryote–archaea grouping, meaning a single domain of Archaea. Phylogenomic studies indicated that Heimdallarchaeota, another group of Asgards, are the closest relatives of eukaryotes. A new group of Asgard described in 2021, named Wukongarchaeota, are also among the eukaryotic roots. Another new Asgard reported in 2022, named Njordarchaeota, is related to the Heimdallarchaeota–Wukongarchaeota branch and is possibly the origin group for eukaryotes.

The Asgards contain at least 80 genes for eukaryotic signature proteins. In addition to actin, tubulin, ubiquitin and ESCRT proteins found in TACK archaea, Asgards contain functional genes for several other eukaryotic proteins such as profilins, ubiquitin system (E1-like, E2-like and small-RING finger (srfp) proteins), membrane-trafficking systems (such as Sec23/24 and TRAPP domains), variety of small GTPases (including Gtr/Rag family GTPase orthologues), and gelsolins.

=== Two-domain system ===
As more archaea were later discovered and better genetic analyses were available, it was realised that the three-domain concept might not have represented the correct origin of eukaryotes. Ford Doolittle, then at Dalhousie University, wrote in 2020:

"[The] three-domain tree wrongly represents evolutionary relationships, presenting a misleading view about how eukaryotes evolved from prokaryotes. The three-domain tree does recognize a specific archaeal–eukaryotic affinity, but it would have the latter arising independently, not from within, the former."

This is because research since the early 2000s has revealed two important issues: eukaryotes originated within Archaea, and a new group of archaea called Asgards represent the root of eukaryotes. This led to the rebirth of the eocyte hypothesis and development of the two-domain system.

Discoveries of eukaryotic signature proteins in TACK and Asgard archaea support the notion that eukaryotes evolved from archaea. Discoveries of more Asgards and better understanding of their nature indicate that they are the likely root of eukaryotes and are considered strong "evidence of the Eocyte hypothesis." Although these facts do not completely rule out the three-domain concept, they generally strengthened the two-domain system.

== See also ==
- Hydrogen hypothesis
