= Kingdom (taxonomy) =

Taxonomic rank

The hierarchy of biological classification's eight major taxonomic ranks. Intermediate minor rankings are not shown.

In biology, a kingdom is the second highest taxonomic rank, just below domain. Kingdoms are divided into smaller groups called phyla (singular phylum).

Traditionally, textbooks from the United States and some of Canada have used a system of six kingdoms (Animalia, Plantae, Fungi, Protista, Archaea or Archaebacteria, and Bacteria or Eubacteria), while textbooks in other parts of the world, such as Bangladesh, Brazil, Greece, India, Pakistan, Spain, and the United Kingdom have used five kingdoms (Animalia, Plantae, Fungi, Protista, and Monera).

Some recent classifications based on modern cladistics have explicitly abandoned the term kingdom, noting that some traditional kingdoms are not monophyletic, meaning that they do not consist of all the descendants of a common ancestor. The terms flora (for plants), fauna (for animals), and, in the 21st century, funga (for fungi) are also used for life present in a particular region or time.

== Definition and associated terms ==
When Carl Linnaeus introduced the rank-based system of nomenclature into biology in 1735, the highest rank was given the name "kingdom" and was followed by four other main or principal ranks: class, order, genus and species. Later two further main ranks were introduced, making the sequence kingdom, phylum or division, class, order, family, genus and species. In 1990, the rank of domain was introduced above kingdom.

Prefixes can be added so subkingdom (subregnum) and infrakingdom (also known as infraregnum) are the two ranks immediately below kingdom. Superkingdom may be considered as an equivalent of domain or empire or as an independent rank between kingdom and domain or subdomain. In some classification systems the additional rank branch (Latin: ramus) can be inserted between subkingdom and infrakingdom, e.g., Protostomia and Deuterostomia in the classification of Cavalier-Smith.

== History ==
=== Two kingdoms of life ===
The classification of living things into animals and plants is an ancient one. Aristotle (384–322 BC) classified animal species in his History of Animals, while his pupil Theophrastus (c. 371 – c. 287 BC) wrote a parallel work, the Historia Plantarum, on plants.

Carl Linnaeus (1707–1778) laid the foundations for modern biological nomenclature, now regulated by the Nomenclature Codes, in 1735. He distinguished two kingdoms of living things: Regnum Animale ('animal kingdom') and Regnum Vegetabile ('vegetable kingdom', for plants). Linnaeus also included minerals in his classification system, placing them in a third kingdom, Regnum Lapideum.

- - Life
    - Regnum Animale (animals)
    - Regnum Vegetabile ('vegetables'/plants)
  - Non‑life
    - Regnum Lapideum (minerals)

=== Three kingdoms of life ===
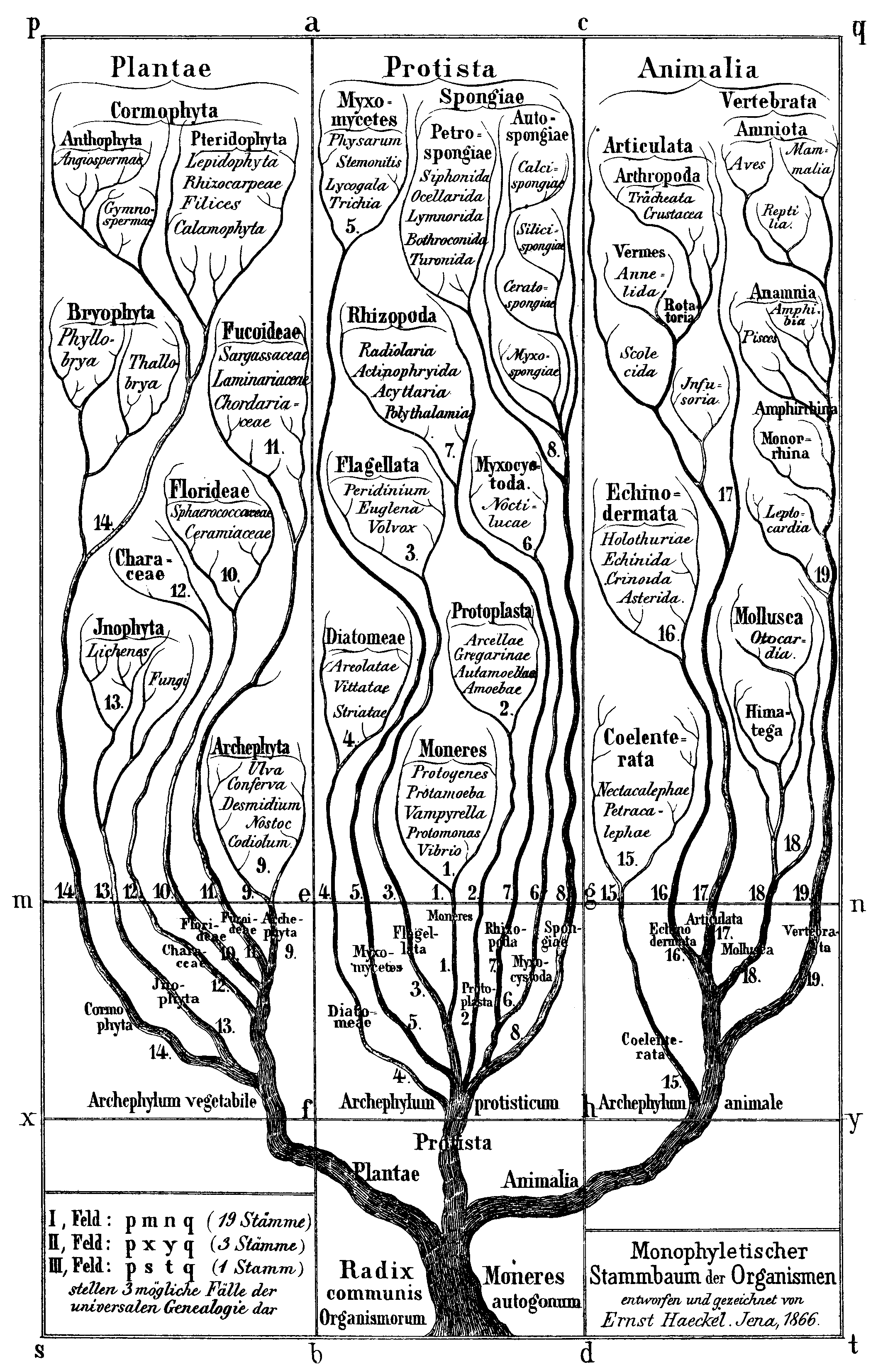
Haeckel's original (1866) conception of the three kingdoms of life, including the new kingdom Protista. Notice the inclusion of the cyanobacterium Nostoc with plants.

In 1674, Antonie van Leeuwenhoek, often called the "father of microscopy", sent the Royal Society of London a copy of his first observations of microscopic single-celled organisms. Until then, the existence of such microscopic organisms was entirely unknown. Despite this, Linnaeus did not include any microscopic creatures in his original taxonomy.

At first, microscopic organisms were classified within the animal and plant kingdoms. However, by the mid–19th century, it had become clear to many that "the existing dichotomy of the plant and animal kingdoms [had become] rapidly blurred at its boundaries and outmoded".

In 1860 John Hogg proposed the Protoctista, a third kingdom of life composed of "all the lower creatures, or the primary organic beings"; he retained Regnum Lapideum as a fourth kingdom of minerals. In 1866, Ernst Haeckel also proposed a third kingdom of life, the Protista, for "neutral organisms" or "the kingdom of primitive forms", which were neither animal nor plant; he did not include the Regnum Lapideum in his scheme. Haeckel revised the content of this kingdom a number of times before settling on a division based on whether organisms were unicellular (Protista) or multicellular (animals and plants).

- - Life
    - Kingdom Protista or Protoctista
    - Kingdom Plantae
    - Kingdom Animalia
  - Non‑life
    - Regnum Lapideum (minerals)

=== Four kingdoms ===
The development of microscopy revealed important distinctions between those organisms whose cells do not have a distinct nucleus (prokaryotes) and organisms whose cells do have a distinct nucleus (eukaryotes). In 1937 Édouard Chatton introduced the terms "prokaryote" and "eukaryote" to differentiate these organisms.

In 1938, Herbert F. Copeland proposed a four-kingdom classification by creating the novel Kingdom Monera of prokaryotic organisms; as a revised phylum Monera of the Protista, it included organisms now classified as Bacteria and Archaea. Ernst Haeckel, in his 1904 book The Wonders of Life, had placed the blue-green algae (or Phycochromacea) in Monera; this would gradually gain acceptance, and the blue-green algae would become classified as bacteria in the phylum Cyanobacteria.

In the 1960s, Roger Stanier and C. B. van Niel promoted and popularized Édouard Chatton's earlier work, particularly in their paper of 1962, "The Concept of a Bacterium"; this created, for the first time, a rank above kingdom—a superkingdom or empire—with the two-empire system of prokaryotes and eukaryotes. The two-empire system would later be expanded to the three-domain system of Archaea, Bacteria, and Eukaryota.

- Life
  - Empire Prokaryota
    - Kingdom Monera
  - Empire Eukaryota
    - Kingdom Protista or Protoctista
    - Kingdom Plantae
    - Kingdom Animalia

=== Five kingdoms ===
The differences between fungi and other organisms regarded as plants had long been recognised by some; Haeckel had moved the fungi out of Plantae into Protista after his original classification, but was largely ignored in this separation by scientists of his time. Robert Whittaker recognized an additional kingdom for the Fungi. The resulting five-kingdom system, proposed in 1969 by Whittaker, has become a popular standard and with some refinement is still used in many works and forms the basis for new multi-kingdom systems. It is based mainly upon differences in nutrition; his Plantae were mostly multicellular autotrophs, his Animalia multicellular heterotrophs, and his Fungi multicellular saprotrophs.

The remaining two kingdoms, Protista and Monera, included unicellular and simple cellular colonies. The five kingdom system may be combined with the two empire system. In the Whittaker system, Plantae included some algae. In other systems, such as Lynn Margulis's system of five kingdoms, the plants included just the land plants (Embryophyta), and Protoctista has a broader definition.

Following publication of Whittaker's system, the five-kingdom model began to be commonly used in high school biology textbooks. But despite the development from two kingdoms to five among most scientists, some authors as late as 1975 continued to employ a traditional two-kingdom system of animals and plants, dividing the plant kingdom into subkingdoms Prokaryota (bacteria and cyanobacteria), Mycota (fungi and supposed relatives), and Chlorota (algae and land plants).

- Life
  - Empire Prokaryota
    - Kingdom Monera
  - Empire Eukaryota
    - Kingdom Protista or Protoctista
    - Kingdom Plantae
    - Kingdom Fungi
    - Kingdom Animalia

Whittaker's five kingdom system (1969)
Kingdom Monera: Branch Myxomonera; Phylum Cyanophyta; Phylum Myxobacteriae; Branch Mastigomonera; Phylum Eubacteriae; Phylum Actinomycota; Phylum Spirochaetae	Kingdom Protista: Phylum Euglenophyta; Phylum Chrysophyta; Phylum Pyrrophyta; Phylum Hyphochytridiomycota; Phylum Plasmodiophoromycota; Phylum Sporozoa; Phylum Cnidosporidia; Phylum Zoomastigina; Phylum Sarcodina; Phylum Ciliophora	Kingdom Plantae: Subkingdom Rhodophycophyta; Phylum Rhodophyta; Subkingdom Phaeophycophyta; Phylum Phaeophyta; Subkingdom Euchlorophyta; Branch Chlorophycophyta; Phylum Chlorophyta; Phylum Charophyta; Branch Metaphyta; Phylum Bryophyta; Phylum Tracheophyta	Kingdom Fungi: Subkingdom Gymnomycota; Phylum Myxomycota; Phylum Acrasiomycota; Phylum Labyrinthulomycota; Subkingdom Dimastigomycota; Phylum Oomycota; Subkingdom Eumycota; Branch Opisthomastigomycota; Phylum Chytridiomycota; Branch Amastigomycota; Phylum Zygomycota; Phylum Ascomycota; Phylum Basidiomycota	Kingdom Animalia: Subkingdom Agnotozoa; Phylum Mesozoa; Subkingdom Parazoa; Phylum Porifera; Phylum Archaeocyatha †; Subkingdom Eumetazoa; Branch Radiata; Phylum Cnidaria; Phylum Ctenophora; Branch Bilateria; Grade Acoelomata; Phylum Platyhelminthes; Phylum Nemertea or Rhynchocoela; Grade Pseudocoelomata; Phylum Acanthocephala; Phylum Aschelminthes; Phylum Entoprocta or Kamptozoa; Grade Coelomata; Subgrade Schizocoela; Phylum Bryozoa or Ectoprocta; Phylum Brachiopoda; Phylum Phoronida; Phylum Mollusca; Phylum Sipunculoidea; Phylum Echiuroidea; Phylum Annelida; Phylum Arthropoda; Subgrade Enterocoela; Phylum Brachiata or Pogonophora; Phylum Chaetognatha; Phylum Echinodermata; Phylum Hemichordata; Phylum Chordata

=== Six kingdoms ===
In 1977, Carl Woese and colleagues proposed the fundamental subdivision of the prokaryotes into the Eubacteria (later called the Bacteria) and Archaebacteria (later called the Archaea), based on ribosomal RNA structure; this would later lead to the proposal of three "domains" of life, of Bacteria, Archaea, and Eukaryota. Combined with the five-kingdom model, this created a six-kingdom model, where the kingdom Monera is replaced by the kingdoms Bacteria and Archaea. This six-kingdom model is commonly used in recent US high school biology textbooks, but has received criticism for compromising the current scientific consensus. But the division of prokaryotes into two kingdoms remains in use with the recent seven kingdoms scheme of Thomas Cavalier-Smith, although it primarily differs in that Protista is replaced by Protozoa and Chromista.

- Life
  - - Domain Prokaryota
      - Kingdom Eubacteria (Bacteria)
      - Kingdom Archaebacteria (Archaea)
  - - Domain Eukaryota
      - Kingdom Protista or Protoctista
      - Kingdom Plantae
      - Kingdom Fungi
      - Kingdom Animalia

=== Cavalier-Smith's classifications ===
==== Eight kingdoms ====
Thomas Cavalier-Smith supported the consensus at that time, that the difference between Eubacteria and Archaebacteria was so great (particularly considering the genetic distance of ribosomal genes) that the prokaryotes needed to be separated into two different kingdoms. He then divided Eubacteria into two subkingdoms: Negibacteria (Gram-negative bacteria) and Posibacteria (Gram-positive bacteria). Technological advances in electron microscopy allowed the separation of the Chromista from the Plantae kingdom. Indeed, the chloroplast of the chromists is located in the lumen of the endoplasmic reticulum instead of in the cytosol. Moreover, only chromists contain chlorophyll c. Since then, many non-photosynthetic phyla of protists, thought to have secondarily lost their chloroplasts, were integrated into the kingdom Chromista.

Finally, some protists lacking mitochondria were discovered. As mitochondria were known to be the result of the endosymbiosis of a proteobacterium, it was thought that these amitochondriate eukaryotes were primitively so, marking an important step in eukaryogenesis. As a result, these amitochondriate protists were separated from the protist kingdom, giving rise to the, at the same time, superkingdom and kingdom Archezoa. This superkingdom was opposed to the Metakaryota superkingdom, grouping together the five other eukaryotic kingdoms (Animalia, Protozoa, Fungi, Plantae and Chromista). This was known as the Archezoa hypothesis, which has since been abandoned; later schemes did not include the Archezoa–Metakaryota divide.

- Life
  - - Superkingdom Prokaryota
      - Kingdom Eubacteria
      - Kingdom Archaebacteria
  - - Superkingdom Archezoa‡
      - Kingdom Archezoa‡
  - - Superkingdom Metakaryota‡
      - Kingdom Protozoa
      - Kingdom Chromista
      - Kingdom Plantae
      - Kingdom Fungi
      - Kingdom Animalia

‡ No longer recognized by taxonomists.

==== Six kingdoms (1998) ====
In 1998, Cavalier-Smith published a six-kingdom model, which has been revised in subsequent papers. The version published in 2009 is shown below. (Note: Compared to the version Cavalier-Smith published in 2004, the alveolates and the rhizarians have been moved from Kingdom Protozoa to Kingdom Chromista.) Cavalier-Smith no longer accepted the importance of the fundamental Eubacteria–Archaebacteria divide put forward by Woese and others and supported by recent research. The kingdom Bacteria (sole kingdom of empire Prokaryota) was subdivided into two sub-kingdoms according to their membrane topologies: Unibacteria and Negibacteria. Unibacteria was divided into phyla Archaebacteria and Posibacteria; the bimembranous-unimembranous transition was thought to be far more fundamental than the long branch of genetic distance of Archaebacteria, viewed as having no particular biological significance.

Cavalier-Smith does not accept the requirement for taxa to be monophyletic ("holophyletic" in his terminology) to be valid. He defines Prokaryota, Bacteria, Negibacteria, Unibacteria, and Posibacteria as valid paraphyla (therefore "monophyletic" in the sense he uses this term) taxa, marking important innovations of biological significance (in regard of the concept of biological niche).

In the same way, his paraphyletic kingdom Protozoa includes the ancestors of Animalia, Fungi, Plantae, and Chromista. The advances of phylogenetic studies allowed Cavalier-Smith to realize that all the phyla thought to be archezoans (i.e. primitively amitochondriate eukaryotes) had in fact secondarily lost their mitochondria, typically by transforming them into new organelles: Hydrogenosomes. This means that all living eukaryotes are in fact metakaryotes, according to the significance of the term given by Cavalier-Smith. Some of the members of the defunct kingdom Archezoa, like the phylum Microsporidia, were reclassified into kingdom Fungi. Others were reclassified in kingdom Protozoa, like Metamonada which is now part of infrakingdom Excavata.

Because Cavalier-Smith allows paraphyly, the diagram below is an "organization chart", not an "ancestor chart", and does not represent an evolutionary tree.

- Life
  - - Empire Prokaryota
      - Kingdom Bacteria — includes Archaebacteria as part of a subkingdom
  - - Empire Eukaryota
      - Kingdom Protozoa — e.g. Amoebozoa, Choanozoa, Excavata
      - Kingdom Chromista — e.g. Alveolata, cryptophytes, Heterokonta (brown algae, diatoms etc.), Haptophyta, Rhizaria
      - Kingdom Plantae — e.g. glaucophytes, red and green algae, land plants
      - Kingdom Fungi
      - Kingdom Animalia

Cavalier-Smith's six kingdom system (1998)
Kingdom Bacteria; Subkingdom Negibacteria; Infrakingdom Lipobacteria; Superphylum Eobacteria; Phylum Heliobacteria; Phylum Hadobacteria; Subphylum Chlorobacteria; Subphylum Deinobacteria; Superphylum Endoflagellata; Phylum Spirochaetae; Subphylum Euspirochaetae; Subphylum Leptospirae; Infrakingdom Glycobacteria; Superphylum Pimelobacteria; Phylum Sphingobacteria; Subphylum Chlorobibacteria; Subphylum Flavobacteria; Phylum Eurybacteria; Subphylum Sclenobacteria; Subphylum Fusobacteria; Subphylum Fibrobacteria; Phylum Cyanobacteria; Subphylum Gloeobacteria; Subphylum Phycobacteria; Phylum Proteobacteria; Subphylum Rhodobacteria; Infraphylum Alphabacteria; Infraphylum Chromatibacteria; Subphylum Thiobacteria; Superphylum Planctobacteria; Phylum Planctobacteria; Subkingdom Unibacteria; Infrakingdom Posibacteria; Phylum Posibacteria; Subphylum Teichobacteria; Infraphylum Endobacteria; Infraphylum Actinobacteria; Subphylum Togobacteria; Infrakingdom Archaebacteria; Phylum Mendosicutes; Subphylum Euryarcheota; Infraphylum Halomebacteria; Infraphylum Eurytherma; Subphylum Sulfobacteria	Kingdom Protozoa; Subkingdom Archezoa; Phylum Metamonada; Subphylum Eopharyngia; Subphylum Axostylaria; Phylum Trichozoa; Subphylum Anaeromonada; Subphylum Parabasala; Subkingdom Neozoa; Infrakingdom Sarcomastigota; Phylum Neomonada; Subphylum Apusozoa; Subphylum Isomita; Subphylum Choanozoa; Phylum Cercozoa; Subphylum Phytomyxa; Subphylum Reticulofilosa; Subphylum Monadofilosa; Phylum Foraminifera; Phylum Amoebozoa; Subphylum Lobosa; Subphylum Conosa; Infraphylum Archamoebae; Infraphylum Mycetozoa; Superclass Eumyxa; Superclass Dictyostelia; Infrakingdom Discicristata; Phylum Percolozoa; Subphylum Tetramitia; Subphylum Pseudociliata; Phylum Euglenozoa; Subphylum Plicostoma; Subphylum Saccostoma; Infrakingdom Alveolata; Superphylum Miozoa; Phylum Dinozoa; Subphylum Protalveolata; Subphylum Dinoflagellata; Phylum Sporozoa; Subphylum Gregarinae; Subphylum Coccidiomorpha; Subphylum Manubrispora; Superphylum Heterokaryota; Phylum Ciliophora; Subphylum Tubulicorticata; Subphylum Epiplasmata; Subphylum Filocorticata; Infrakingdom Actinopoda; Phylum Heliozoa; Phylum Radiozoa; Subphylum Spasmaria; Subphylum Radiolaria	Kingdom Fungi; Subkingdom Eomycota; Phylum Archemycota; Subphylum Dictyomycotina; Class Chytridiomycetes; Subclass Rumpomycetidae; Subclass Spizomycetidae; Class Enteromycetes; Subphylum Melanomycotina; Infraphylum Allomycotina; Class Allomycetes; Infraphylum Zygomycotina; Superclass Eozygomycetia; Class Bolomycetes; Class Glomomycetes; Superclass Neozygomycetia; Class Zygomycetes; Subclass Mucoromycetidae; Subclass Meromycetidae; Class Zoomycetes; Subclass Entomycetidae; Subclass Pedomycetidae; Superorder Trichomycetalia; Superorder Pyxomycetalia; Phylum Microsporidia; Class Minisporea; Class Microsporea; Subclass Pleistophorea; Subclas Disporea; Subkingdom Neomycota; Phylum Ascomycota; Subphylum Hemiascomycotina; Class Taphrinomycetes; Class Geomycetes; Class Endomycetes; Subclass Dipomycetidae; Subclass Saccharomycetidae; Subphylum Euascomycotina; Class Discomycetes; Subclass Calycomycetidae; Subclass Lecomycetidae; Subclass Pezomycetidae; Class Pyrenomycetes; Subclass Verrucomycetidae; Subclass Ostiomycetidae; Class Loculomycetes; Subclass Dendromycetidae; Subclass Loculoascomycetidae; Class Plectomycetes; Phylum Basidiomycota; Subphylum Septomycotina; Class Septomycetes; Subclass Sporidiomycetidae; Subclass Uredomycetidae; Subphylum Orthomycotina; Superclass Hemibasidiomycetia; Class Ustomycetes; Superclass Hymenomycetia; Class Gelimycetes; Subclass Tremellomycetidae; Subclass Dacrymycetidae; Subclass Auromycetidae; Class Homobasidiomycetes; Subclass Clavomycetidae; Subclass Pileomycetidae	Kingdom Animalia; Subkingdom Radiata; Infrakingdom Spongiaria; Phylum Porifera; Subphylum Hyalospongiae; Subphylum Calcispongiae; Subphylum Archaeocyatha †; Infrakingdom Coelenterata; Phylum Cnidaria; Subphylum Anthozoa; Subphylum Medusozoa; Infrakingdom Placozoa; Phylum Placozoa; Subkingdom Myxozoa; Phylum Myxosporidia; Subkingdom Bilateria; Branch Protostomia; Infrakingdom Lophozoa; Superphylum Polyzoa; Phylum Bryozoa; Subphylum Gymnolaemata; Subphylum Lophopoda; Phylum Kamptozoa; Subphylum Entoprocta; Subphylum Cycliophora; Superphylum Conchozoa; Phylum Mollusca; Subphylum Bivalvia; Subphylum Glossophora; Infraphylum Univalvia; Infraphylum Spiculata; Infraphylum Cephalopoda; Phylum Brachiozoa; Subphylum Brachiopoda; Subphylum Phoronida; Superphylum Sipuncula; Phylum Sipuncula; Superphylum Vermizoa; Phylum Annelida; Subphylum Polychaeta; Infraphylum Operculata; Infraphylum Pharyngata; Subphylum Clitellata; Subphylum Echiura; Subphylum Pogonophora; Phylum Nemertina; Infrakingdom Chaetognathi; Phylum Chaetognatha; Infrakingdom Ecdysozoa; Superphylum Haemopoda; Phylum Arthropoda; Subphylum Cheliceromorpha; Infraphylum Pycnogonida; Infraphylum Chelicerata; Subphylum Trilobitomorpha †; Subphylum Mandibulata; Infraphylum Crustacea; Infraphylum Myriapoda; Infraphylum Insecta; Phylum Lobopoda; Subphylum Onychophora; Subphylum Tardigrada; Superphylum Nemathelminthes; Phylum Nemathelminthes; Subphylum Scalidorhyncha; Infraphylum Priapozoa; Infraphylum Kinorhyncha; Subphylum Nematoida; Infraphylum Nematoda; Infraphylum Nematomorpha; Infrakingdom Platyzoa; Phylum Acanthognatha; Subphylum Trochata; Infraphylum Rotifera; Infraphylum Acanthocephala; Subphylum Monokonta; Phylum Platyhelminthes; Subphylum Turbellaria; Infraphylum Mucorhabda; Infraphylum Rhabditophora; Subphylum Neodermata; Infraphylum Trematoda; Infraphylum Cercomeromorpha; Branch Deuterostomia; Infrakingdom Coelomopora; Phylum Hemichordata; Subphylum Pterobranchia; Subphylum Enteropneusta; Phylum Echinodermata; Subphylum Homalozoa; Subphylum Pelmatozoa; Infraphylum Blastozoa; Infraphylum Crinozoa; Subphylum Eleutherozoa; Infraphylum Asterozoa; Infraphylum Echinozoa; Infrakingdom Chordonia; Phylum Urochorda; Subphylum Tunicata; Infraphylum Ascidiae; Infraphylum Thaliae; Subphylum Appendicularia; Phylum Chordata; Subphylum Acraniata; Infraphylum Cephalochordata; Infraphylum Conodonta †; Subphylum Vertebrata; Infraphylum Agnatha; Infraphylum Gnathostomata; Subkingdom Mesozoa; Phylum Mesozoa	Kingdom Plantae; Subkingdom Biliphyta; Infrakingdom Glaucophyta; Phylum Glaucophyta; Infrakingdom Rhodophyta; Phylum Rhodophyta; Subphylum Rhodellophytina; Subphylum Macrorhodophytina; Subkingdom Viridiplantae; Infrakingdom Chlorophyta; Phylum Chlorophyta; Subphylum Chlorophytina; Infraphylum Prasinophytae; Infraphylum Tetraphytae; Subphylum Phragmophytina; Infraphylum Charophytae; Infraphylum Rudophytae; Infrakingdom Cormophyta; Phylum Bryophyta; Subphylum Hepaticae; Subphylum Anthocerotae; Subphylum Musci; Infraphylum Sphagneae; Infraphylum Bryatae; Phylum Tracheophyta; Subphylum Pteridophytina; Infraphylum Psilophytae; Infraphylum Lycophytae; Infraphylum Sphenophytae; Infraphylum Filices; Subphylum Spermatophytina; Infraphylum Gymnospermae; Infraphylum Angiospermae	Kingdom Chromista; Subkingdom Cryptista; Phylum Cryptophyta; Subkingdom Chromobiota; Infrakingdom Heterokonta; Superphylum Sagenista; Phylum Sagenista; Subphylum Bicoecia; Subphylum Labyrinthista; Phylum Ochrophyta; Subphylum Phaeista; Infraphylum Hypogyrista; Infraphylum Chrysista; Subphylum Diatomeae; Phylum Bigyra; Subphylum Bigyromonada; Subphylum Pseudofungi; Subphylum Opalinata; Infrakingdom Haptophyta; Phylum Haptophyta

==== Seven kingdoms ====
Cavalier-Smith and his collaborators revised their classification in 2015. In this scheme they introduced two superkingdoms of Prokaryota and Eukaryota and seven kingdoms. Prokaryota have two kingdoms: Bacteria and Archaea. (This was based on the consensus in the Taxonomic Outline of Bacteria and Archaea, and the Catalogue of Life). The Eukaryota have five kingdoms: Protozoa, Chromista, Plantae, Fungi, and Animalia. In this classification a protist is any of the eukaryotic unicellular organisms.

- Life
  - - Superkingdom Prokaryota
      - Kingdom Bacteria
      - Kingdom Archaea
  - - Superkingdom Eukaryota
      - Kingdom Protozoa—e.g. Amoebozoa, Choanozoa, Excavata
      - Kingdom Chromista—e.g. Alveolata, cryptophytes, Heterokonta (Brown Algae, Diatoms etc.), Haptophyta, Rhizaria
      - Kingdom Plantae—e.g. glaucophytes, red and green algae, land plants
      - Kingdom Fungi
      - Kingdom Animalia

=== Summary ===
Linnaeus 1735	Haeckel 1866	Chatton 1925	Copeland 1938	Whittaker 1969	Woese et al. 1977	Woese et al. 1990	Cavalier-Smith 1993	Cavalier-Smith 1998	Ruggiero et al. 2015
—	—	2 empires	2 empires	2 empires	2 empires	3 domains	3 superkingdoms	2 empires	2 superkingdoms
2 kingdoms	3 kingdoms	—	4 kingdoms	5 kingdoms	6 kingdoms	—	8 kingdoms	6 kingdoms	7 kingdoms
—	Protista	Prokaryota	Monera	Monera	Eubacteria	Bacteria	Eubacteria	Bacteria	Bacteria
—	Protista	Prokaryota	Monera	Monera	Archaebacteria	Archaea	Archaebacteria	Bacteria	Archaea
—	Protista	Eukaryota	Protista	Protista	Protista	Eucarya	Archezoa	Protozoa	Protozoa
—	Protista	Eukaryota	Protista	Protista	Protista	Eucarya	Protozoa	Protozoa	Protozoa
—	Protista	Eukaryota	Protista	Protista	Protista	Eucarya	Chromista	Chromista	Chromista
Vegetabilia	Plantae	Eukaryota	Plantae	Plantae	Plantae	Eucarya	Plantae	Plantae	Plantae
Vegetabilia	Plantae	Eukaryota	Plantae	Fungi	Fungi	Eucarya	Fungi	Fungi	Fungi
Animalia	Animalia	Eukaryota	Animalia	Animalia	Animalia	Eucarya	Animalia	Animalia	Animalia

The kingdom-level classification of life is still widely employed as a useful way of grouping organisms, notwithstanding some problems with this approach:

- Kingdoms such as Protozoa represent grades rather than clades, and so are rejected by phylogenetic classification systems.
- The most recent research does not support the classification of the eukaryotes into any of the standard systems. In 2009, Andrew Roger and Alastair Simpson emphasized the need for diligence in analyzing new discoveries: "With the current pace of change in our understanding of the eukaryote tree of life, we should proceed with caution." Kingdoms are rarely used in academic phylogeny and are more common in introductory education, where 5–6 kingdom models are preferred.

== Beyond traditional kingdoms ==
While the concept of kingdoms continues to be used by some taxonomists, there has been a movement away from traditional kingdoms, as they are no longer seen as providing a cladistic classification, where there is emphasis in arranging organisms into natural groups.

=== Three domains of life ===
A phylogenetic tree based on rRNA data showing Woese's three-domain system. All smaller branches can be considered kingdoms.

Based on RNA studies, Carl Woese thought life could be divided into three large divisions and referred to them as the "three primary kingdom" model or "urkingdom" model.

In 1990, the name "domain" was proposed for the highest rank, with Latin equivalent regio. Woese divided the prokaryotes (previously classified as the Kingdom Monera) into two groups, called Eubacteria and Archaebacteria, stressing that there was as much genetic difference between these two groups as between either of them and all eukaryotes.

- Life
  - Domain Bacteria (Eubacteria)
  - Domain Archaea (Archaebacteria)
  - Domain Eukarya (Eukaryota)

According to genetic data, although eukaryote groups such as plants, fungi, and animals may look different, they are more closely related to each other than they are to either the Eubacteria or Archaea. It was also found that the eukaryotes are more closely related to the Archaea than they are to the Eubacteria. Although the primacy of the Eubacteria-Archaea divide has been questioned, it has been upheld by subsequent research. There is no consensus on how many kingdoms exist in the classification scheme proposed by Woese.

=== Eukaryotic supergroups ===
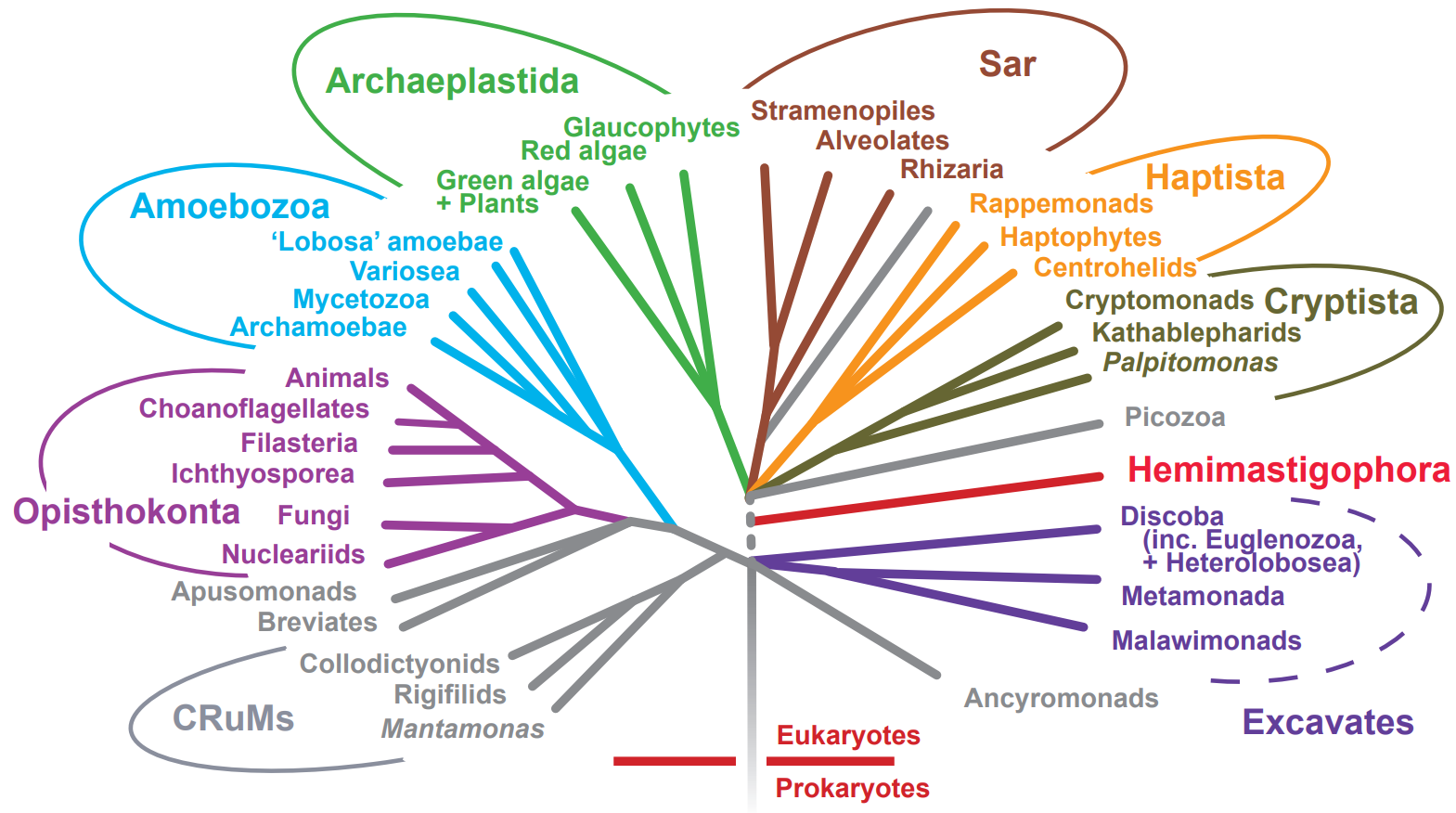
One hypothesis of eukaryotic relationships depicted by Alastair Simpson

In 2004, a review article by Simpson and Roger noted that the Protista were "a grab-bag for all eukaryotes that are not animals, plants or fungi". They held that only monophyletic groups should be accepted as formal ranks in a classification and that – while this approach had been impractical previously (necessitating "literally dozens of eukaryotic 'kingdoms'") – it had now become possible to divide the eukaryotes into "just a few major groups that are probably all monophyletic".

On this basis, the diagram opposite (redrawn from their article) showed the real "kingdoms" (their quotation marks) of the eukaryotes. A classification which followed this approach was produced in 2005 for the International Society of Protistologists, by a committee which "worked in collaboration with specialists from many societies". It divided the eukaryotes into the same six "supergroups". The published classification deliberately did not use formal taxonomic ranks, including that of "kingdom".

- Life
  - - Domain Bacteria
      - prokaryotic Bacteria
  - - Domain Archaea
      - prokaryotic Archaeans
  - - Domain Eukaryota
      - Excavata
        various flagellate protozoa
      - Amoebozoa
        most lobose amoeboids and slime moulds
      - Opisthokonta
        animals, fungi, choanoflagellates, etc.
      - Rhizaria
        Foraminifera, Radiolaria, and various other amoeboid protozoa
      - Chromalveolata
        Stramenopiles (Brown Algae, Diatoms, etc.), Haptophyta, Cryptophyta (or cryptomonads), and Alveolata
      - Archaeplastida (or Primoplantae)
        Land plants, green algae, red algae, and glaucophytes

In this system the multicellular animals (Metazoa) are descended from the same ancestor as both the unicellular choanoflagellates and the fungi which form the Opisthokonta. Plants are thought to be more distantly related to animals and fungi.

However, in the same year as the International Society of Protistologists' classification was published (2005), doubts were being expressed as to whether some of these supergroups were monophyletic, particularly the Chromalveolata, and a review in 2006 noted the lack of evidence for several of the six proposed supergroups.

As of 2019, there is widespread agreement that the Rhizaria belong with the Stramenopiles and the Alveolata, in a clade dubbed the SAR supergroup, so that Rhizaria is not one of the main eukaryote groups.

=== Prokaryotic kingdoms ===
The Prokaryotic Code treats Bacteria and Archaea each as a domain. Since 2024, each domain contains 4 kingdoms, for a total of 8. Domain Bacteria includes kingdoms Bacillati, Fusobacteriati, Pseudomonadati and Thermotogati. Domain Archaea includes kingdoms Methanobacteriati, Nanobdellati, Promethearchaeati and Thermoproteati.

=== Comparison of top level classification ===
Some authors have added non-cellular life to their classifications. This can create a "superdomain" called "Acytota", also called "Aphanobionta", of non-cellular life; with the other superdomain being "cytota" or cellular life. (see section below for further discussion)

The eocyte hypothesis proposes that the eukaryotes emerged from a phylum within the archaea called the Thermoproteota (formerly known as eocytes or Crenarchaeota).

Taxonomical root node	Two superdomains (controversial)	Two empires	Three domains	Five Dominiums	Five kingdoms	Six kingdoms	Eocyte hypothesis
Biota / Vitae / Life	Acytota / Aphanobionta non-cellular life			Virusobiota (Viruses, Viroids)			
Biota / Vitae / Life	Acytota / Aphanobionta non-cellular life			Prionobiota (Prions)			
Biota / Vitae / Life	Cytota cellular life	Prokaryota / Procarya (Monera)	Bacteria	Bacteria	Monera	Eubacteria	Bacteria
Biota / Vitae / Life	Cytota cellular life	Prokaryota / Procarya (Monera)	Archaea	Archaea	Monera	Archaebacteria	Archaea including eukaryotes
Biota / Vitae / Life	Cytota cellular life	Eukaryota / Eukarya			Protista		Archaea including eukaryotes
Biota / Vitae / Life	Cytota cellular life	Eukaryota / Eukarya			Fungi		Archaea including eukaryotes
Biota / Vitae / Life	Cytota cellular life	Eukaryota / Eukarya			Plantae		Archaea including eukaryotes
Biota / Vitae / Life	Cytota cellular life	Eukaryota / Eukarya			Animalia		Archaea including eukaryotes

== Viruses ==
There is a large, but not absolute, consensus that viruses are not alive. However, for the sake of convenience, the International Committee on Taxonomy of Viruses uses the taxonomic rank "kingdom" in the classification of viruses (with the suffix -virae); this is beneath the top level classifications of realm and subrealm, classifying viruses using binomial nomenclature like living organisms.

Arguments against viruses being alive include the fact that they are obligate intracellular parasites that lack metabolism and are not capable of replication outside of a host cell. Another argument is that their placement in the tree would be problematic, since it is suspected that viruses have various evolutionary origins, and they have a penchant for harvesting nucleotide sequences from their hosts.

== See also ==
- Cladistics
- Phylogenetics
- Systematics
- Taxonomy
