= Hydrogen hypothesis =

The Hydrogen hypothesis is a model proposed by William F. Martin and Miklós Müller in 1998 that describes a possible way in which the mitochondrion arose as an endosymbiont within a prokaryotic host in the archaea, giving rise to a symbiotic association of two cells from which the first eukaryotic cell could have arisen (symbiogenesis).

According to the hydrogen hypothesis:

- The hosts that acquired the mitochondria were hydrogen-dependent archaea, possibly similar in physiology to modern methanogenic archaea, which use hydrogen and carbon dioxide to produce methane;
- The future mitochondrion was a facultatively anaerobic eubacterium which produced hydrogen and carbon dioxide as byproducts of anaerobic respiration;
- A symbiotic relationship between the two started, based on the host's hydrogen dependence (anaerobic syntrophy).

== Mechanism ==
The hydrogen hypothesis differs from many alternative views within the endosymbiotic theory framework, which suggest that the first eukaryotic cells evolved a nucleus but lacked mitochondria. Mitochondria are taken as arising from a eukaryote engulfing a primitive bacterium. Most predict that some eukaryotes never possessed mitochondria. Most do not address the common ancestry of mitochondria and hydrogenosomes: anaerobic mitochondria that produce ATP by converting pyruvate into hydrogen, carbon dioxide and acetate.

The hydrogen hypothesis predicts that no primitive eukaryotes lacking mitochondrion ever existed, attaching evolutionary significance to hydrogenosomes. This provides a rationale for their common ancestry with mitochondria, and a straightforward explanation for the observation that eukaryotes are genetic chimeras with genes of archaeal and eubacterial ancestry. It implies that archaea and eukarya split after the modern groups of archaea appeared.

In the 15 years following the publication of the hydrogen hypothesis, that no primitively mitochondrion-lacking eukaryotes ever existed, has been tested many times and found to be in agreement with observation. Examples from modern biology are known where methanogens cluster around hydrogenosomes within eukaryotic cells.

== Lokiarchaeota ==
In 2015, the discovery and placement of the Lokiarchaeota (an archaeal lineage possessing an expanded genetic repertoire including genes involved in membrane remodeling and actin cytoskeletal structure) as the sister group to eukaryotes called into question particular tenets of the hydrogen hypothesis, as Lokiarchaeota appeared to lack methanogenesis. However, further examination revealed that Lokiarchaeota are indeed hydrogen-dependent, with evidence for methanogen-like metabolism outside of the euryarchaeotes.

== See also ==
- Archezoa
- Eocyte hypothesis
