= Metakaryota =

Scientific classification (obsolete)
- Clade: Eukaryota
- Superkingdom: Metakaryota; Cavalier-Smith 1991

Kingdoms
- Old classification: Protozoa; Animalia; Plantae; Fungi; Chromista

Superkingdom of eukaryotes

The superkingdom Metakaryota was defined by Thomas Cavalier-Smith as advanced eukaryotes resulting from the endosymbiosis of a proteobacterium, giving rise to the mitochondrion, by an archezoan eukaryote. However, with the collapse of the Archezoa hypothesis (that amitochondriate eukaryotes were basal), this grouping was abandoned in later schemes.

In 2023, using molecular phylogenetic analysis of 186 taxa, Al Jewari and Baldauf proposed a phylogenetic tree with the metamonad Parabasalia as basal eukaryotes. Discoba and the rest of the Eukaryota appear to have emerged as sister taxon to the Preaxostyla, incorporating a single alphaproteobacterium as mitochondria by endosymbiosis. Thus the Fornicata are more closely related to e.g. animals than to Parabasalia. The rest of the eukaryotes emerged within the Excavata as sister of the Discoba. Caesar al Jewari and Sandra Baldauf argue instead that the eukaryotes possibly started with an endosymbiosis event of a deltaproteobacterium or gammaproteobacterium, accounting for the otherwise unexplained presence of anaerobic bacterial enzymes in metamonada in this scenario. The sister of the Preaxostyla within Metamonada represents the rest of the eukaryotes which acquired an alphaproteobacterium.

- - "Hodarchaeales"
  - Eukaryota (+proteobacterium)
    - Parabasalia
    - - Fornicata
      - - Preaxostyla
        - Metakaryota (+alphaproteobacterium)
          - Discoba
            - Jakobida
            - - Heterolobosea
              - Euglenozoa and allies
          - Neokaryotes
            - Amorphea (inc. animals, fungi)
            - - SAR
              - (+cyanobacterium)
                Archaeplastida (inc. plants)
