= Domain (taxonomy) =

Taxonomic rank

The hierarchy of biological classification's eight major taxonomic ranks. Intermediate minor rankings are not shown.

In biological taxonomy, a domain (/dəˈmeɪn/ or /doʊˈmeɪn/) (Latin: regio or dominium), also dominion, is the highest taxonomic rank of all organisms taken together. It was introduced in the three-domain system of taxonomy devised by Carl Woese, Otto Kandler and Mark Wheelis in 1990.

According to the domain system, the tree of life consists of either three domains, Archaea, Bacteria, and Eukarya, or two domains, Archaea and Bacteria, with Eukarya included in Archaea. In the three-domain model, the first two are prokaryotes, single-celled microorganisms without a membrane-bound nucleus. All organisms that have a cell nucleus and other membrane-bound organelles are included in Eukarya and called eukaryotes.

Non-cellular life, most notably the viruses, is not included in this system. Alternatives to the three-domain system include the earlier two-empire system (with the empires Prokaryota and Eukaryota), and the eocyte hypothesis (with two domains of Bacteria and Archaea, with Eukarya included as a branch of Archaea).

== Terminology ==
The term domain was proposed by Carl Woese, Otto Kandler, and Mark Wheelis (1990) in a three-domain system.

== Development of the domain system ==
Carl Linnaeus made the classification "domain" popular in the famous taxonomy system he created in the middle of the eighteenth century. This system was further improved by the studies of Charles Darwin later on but could not classify bacteria easily, as they have very few observable features to compare to the other domains.

The mycologist Royall T. Moore proposed the similar term dominion (Latin: dominium) in 1974, but this was not widely adopted. His proposed system had three dominions: Virus, Prokaryota, and Eukaryota.

Carl Woese made a revolutionary breakthrough when, in 1977, he compared the nucleotide sequences of the 16s ribosomal RNA and discovered that the rank "domain" contained three branches, not two as scientists had previously thought. Initially, due to their physical similarities, Archaea (earlier "archaebacteria") was not separated from Bacteria (earlier "eubacteria"). However, scientists now know that these two domains are hardly similar and are internally distinctly different.

== Characteristics of the three domains ==
A speculatively rooted tree for RNA genes, showing major branches Bacteria, Archaea, and Eukaryota

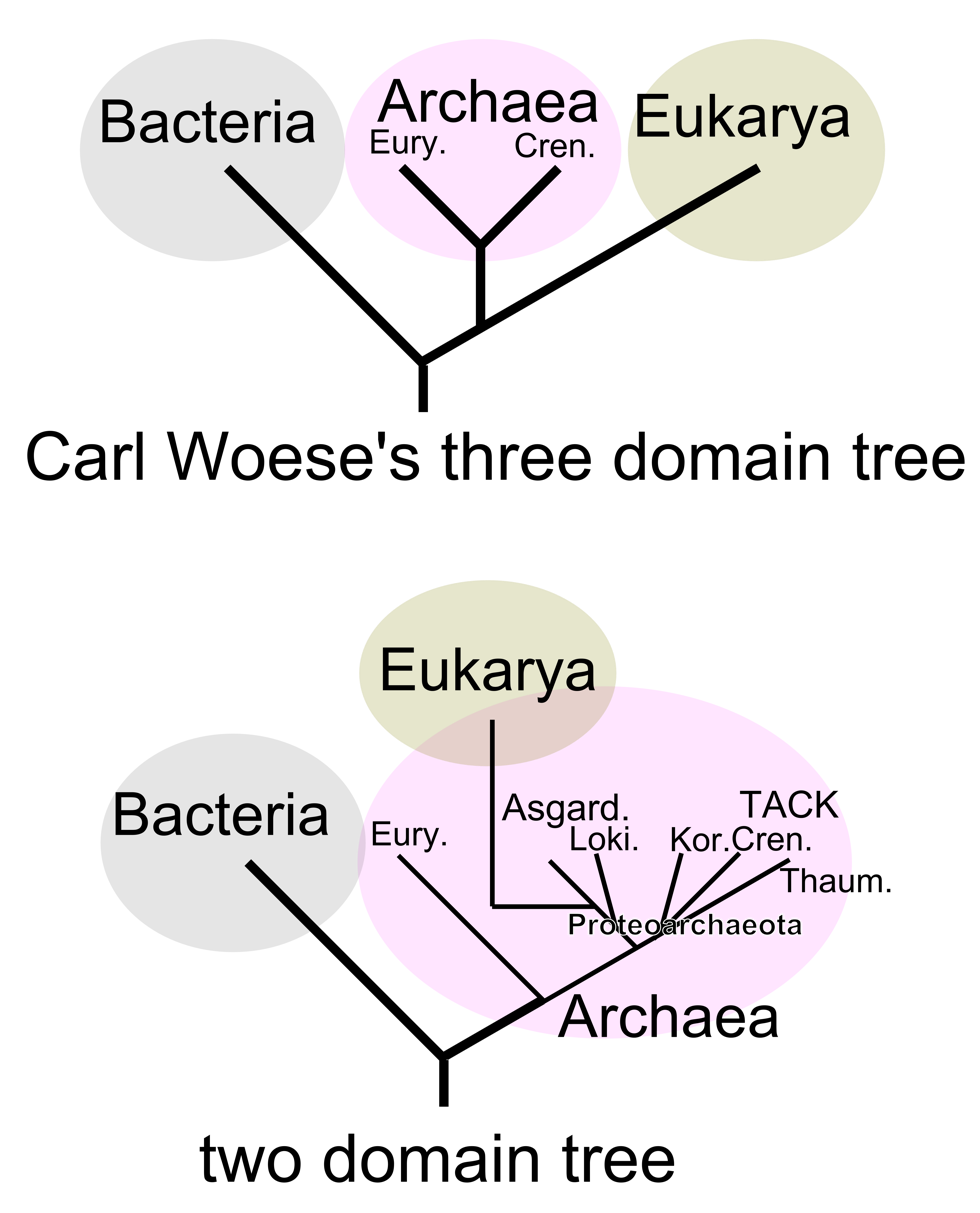
The three-domain tree and the eocyte hypothesis (two-domain tree), 2008.

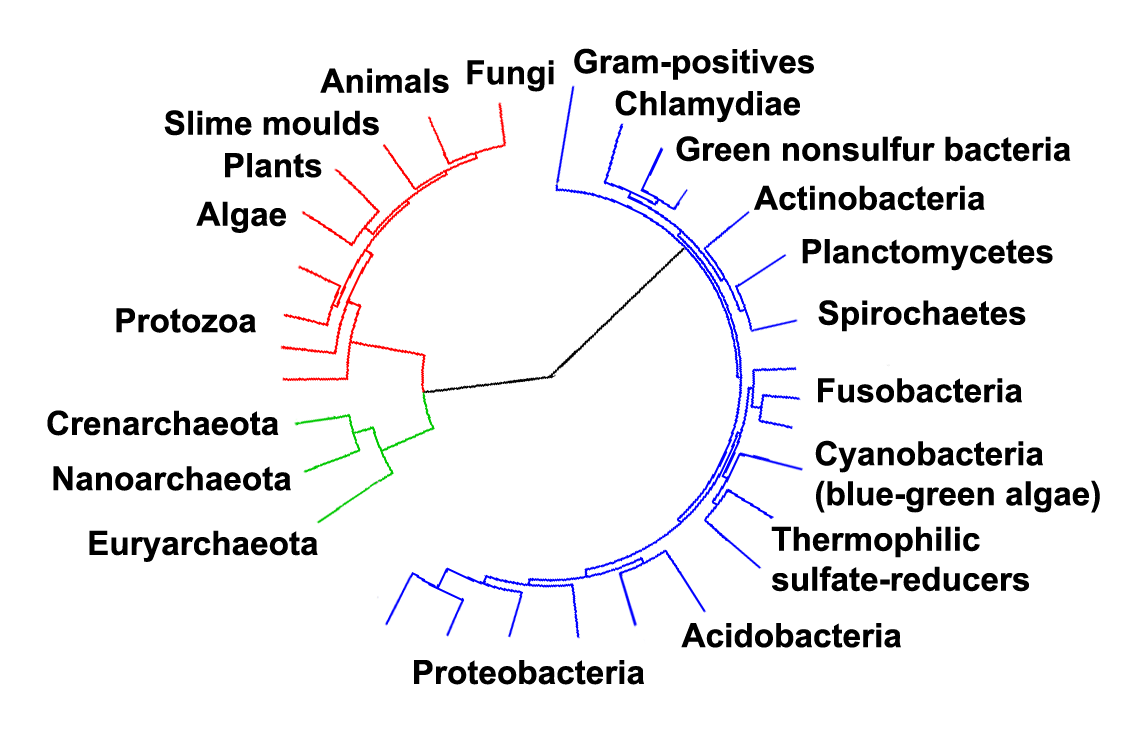
Phylogenetic tree showing the relationship between the eukaryotes and other forms of life, 2006. Eukaryotes are colored red, archaea green, and bacteria blue.

Each of these three domains contains unique ribosomal RNA. This forms the basis of the three-domain system. While the presence of a nuclear membrane differentiates the Eukarya from the Archaea and Bacteria, both of which lack a nuclear envelope, the Archaea and Bacteria are distinct from each other due to differences in the biochemistry of their cell membranes and RNA markers.

=== Archaea ===
Archaea are prokaryotic cells, typically characterized by membrane lipids that are branched hydrocarbon chains attached to glycerol by ether linkages. The presence of these ether linkages in Archaea adds to their capability to withstand extreme temperatures and highly acidic conditions, but many archaea live in mild environments. Halophiles (organisms that thrive in highly salty environments) and hyperthermophiles (organisms that thrive in extremely hot environments) are examples of Archaea.

Archaea are relatively small. They range from 0.1 μm to 15 μm diameter and up to 200 μm long, about the size of bacteria and the mitochondria found in eukaryotic cells. Members of the genus Thermoplasma are the smallest Archaea.

=== Bacteria ===
Cyanobacteria and mycoplasmas are two examples of bacteria. Even though bacteria are prokaryotic cells like Archaea, their cell membranes are instead made of phospholipid bilayers, with none of the ether linkages that Archaea have. Internally, bacteria have different RNA structures in their ribosomes, hence they are grouped into a different category. In the two- and three-domain systems, this puts them into a separate domain.

There is a great deal of diversity in the domain Bacteria. That diversity is further confounded by the exchange of genes between different bacterial lineages. The occurrence of duplicate genes between otherwise distantly-related bacteria makes it nearly impossible to distinguish bacterial species, count the bacterial species on the Earth, or organize them into a tree-like structure (unless the structure includes cross-connections between branches, making it a "network" instead of a "tree").

=== Eukarya ===
Members of the domain Eukarya—called eukaryotes—have membrane-bound organelles (including a nucleus containing genetic material) and are represented by four kingdoms: Plantae, Protista, Animalia, and Fungi. It's believed to have evolved from Archaea, according to the Eocyte hypothesis.

== Exclusion of viruses and prions ==
The three-domain system includes no form of non-cellular life. Stefan Luketa proposed a five-dominion system in 2012, adding Prionobiota (acellular and without nucleic acid) and Virusobiota (acellular but with nucleic acid) to the traditional three domains.

== Alternative classifications ==
Taxonomical root node	Two superdomains (controversial)	Two empires	Three domains	Five Dominiums	Five kingdoms	Six kingdoms	Eocyte hypothesis
Biota / Vitae / Life	Acytota / Aphanobionta non-cellular life			Virusobiota (Viruses, Viroids)			
Biota / Vitae / Life	Acytota / Aphanobionta non-cellular life			Prionobiota (Prions)			
Biota / Vitae / Life	Cytota cellular life	Prokaryota / Procarya (Monera)	Bacteria	Bacteria	Monera	Eubacteria	Bacteria
Biota / Vitae / Life	Cytota cellular life	Prokaryota / Procarya (Monera)	Archaea	Archaea	Monera	Archaebacteria	Archaea including eukaryotes
Biota / Vitae / Life	Cytota cellular life	Eukaryota / Eukarya			Protista		Archaea including eukaryotes
Biota / Vitae / Life	Cytota cellular life	Eukaryota / Eukarya			Fungi		Archaea including eukaryotes
Biota / Vitae / Life	Cytota cellular life	Eukaryota / Eukarya			Plantae		Archaea including eukaryotes
Biota / Vitae / Life	Cytota cellular life	Eukaryota / Eukarya			Animalia		Archaea including eukaryotes

Alternative classifications of life include:

- The two-empire system, proposed by Mayr (1998), with top-level groupings of Prokaryota (or Monera) and Eukaryota.
- The eocyte hypothesis, proposed by Lake et al. (1984), which posits two domains, Bacteria and Archaea, with Eukaryota included as a subordinate clade branching from Archaea.
- The five-dominium system, proposed by Stefan Luketa (2012), The listed Eukarya, Archaea, Bacteria, Virusobiota, Prionobiota.

== See also ==
- Biological dark matter
- Neomura, which is the two domains of life of Archaea and Eukaryota
- Phylogenetics
- Protein structure
- Realm (virology), an equivalent rank for non-cellular life
- Systematics
