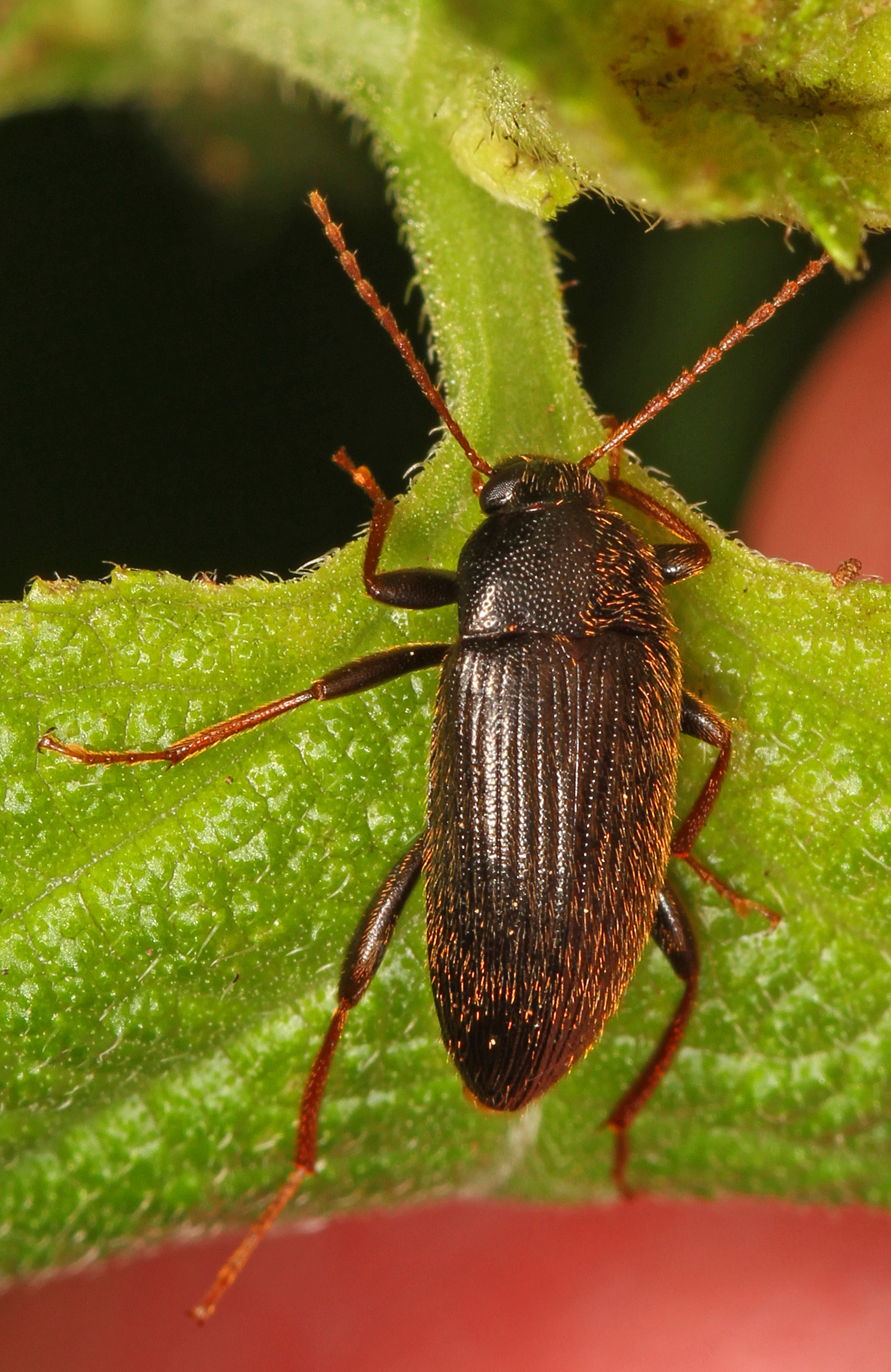

Scientific classification
- Domain: Eukaryota
- Kingdom: Animalia
- Phylum: Arthropoda
- Class: Insecta
- Order: Coleoptera
- Suborder: Polyphaga
- Infraorder: Cucujiformia
- Family: Tenebrionidae
- Subtribe: Alleculina
- Genus: Lobopoda; Solier, 1835

Type species
- Lobopoda striata

Subgenera
- See text.

= Lobopoda =

Genus of beetles

Lobopoda is a genus of comb-clawed beetles in the family Tenebrionidae. The type species is Lobopoda striata. The following subgenera of Lobopoda have been described:

- (Lobopoda) Flavipoda Campbell, 1966
- (Lobopoda) Glabrilobopoda Campbell, 1966
- (Lobopoda) Lobopoda Solier, 1835
- (Lobopoda) Mesolobopoda Campbell, 1966
- (Lobopoda) Monoloba Solier, 1835
