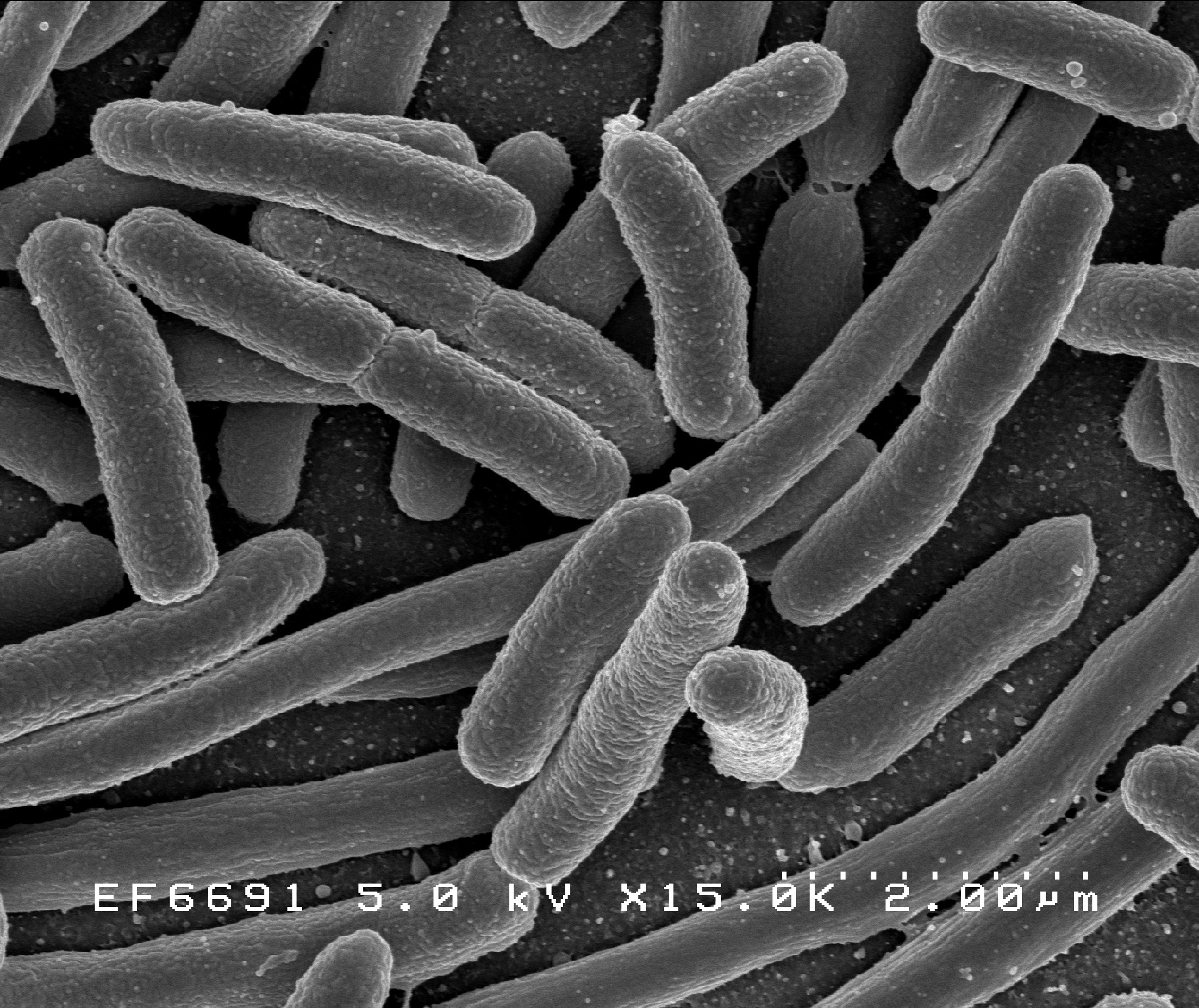
- Scanning electron micrograph of Escherichia coli rods

Scientific classification

Groups included
- Bacteria and Archaea

Cladistically included but traditionally excluded taxa
- Domain Eukaryota

= Monera =

Historically, a biological kingdom

Monera (/məˈnɪərə/) (Greek: μονήρης (monḗrēs), "single", "solitary") is historically a biological kingdom that is made up of unicellular prokaryotes: single-celled organisms that lack a nucleus.

The taxon Monera was first proposed as a phylum by Ernst Haeckel in 1866. Subsequently, the phylum was elevated to the rank of kingdom in 1925 by Édouard Chatton. The last commonly accepted mega-classification with the taxon Monera was the five-kingdom classification system established by Robert Whittaker in 1969.

Under the three-domain system of taxonomy, introduced by Carl Woese in 1977, which reflects the evolutionary history of life, the organisms found in kingdom Monera have been divided into two domains, Archaea and Bacteria (with Eukarya as the third domain). Furthermore, the taxon Monera is paraphyletic (does not include all descendants of their most recent common ancestor), as Archaea and Eukarya are currently believed to be more closely related than either is to Bacteria. The term "moneran" is the informal name of members of this group and is still sometimes used (as is the term "prokaryote") to denote a member of either domain.

Most bacteria were classified under Monera; however, some Cyanobacteria (often called the blue-green algae) were initially classified under Plantae due to their ability to photosynthesize.

== History ==
=== Haeckel's classification ===
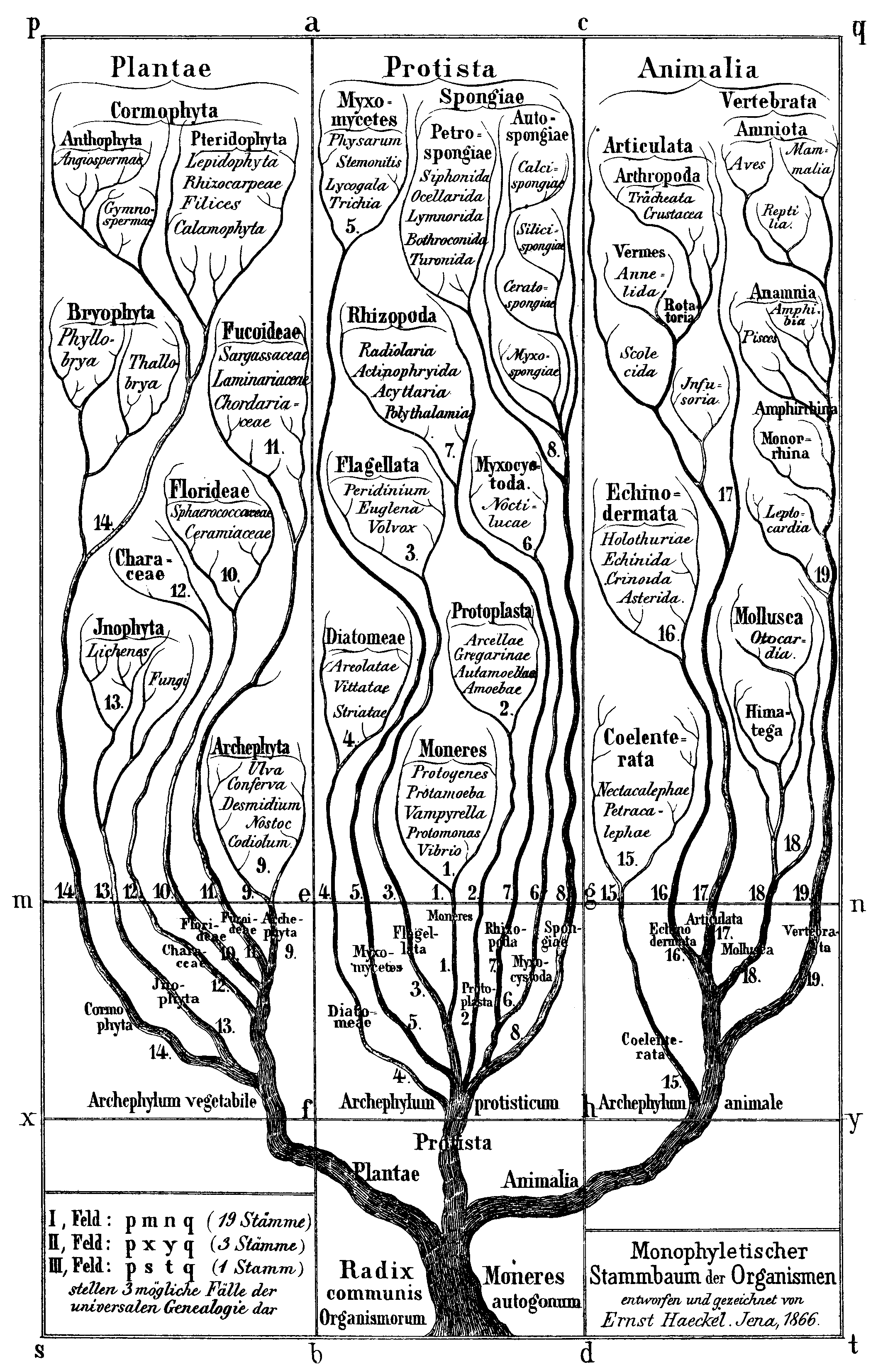
Tree of Life in Generelle Morphologie der Organismen (1866)

Traditionally the natural world was classified as animal, vegetable, or mineral as in Systema Naturae. After the development of the microscope, attempts were made to fit microscopic organisms into either the plant or animal kingdoms. In 1675, Antonie van Leeuwenhoek discovered bacteria and called them "animalcules", assigning them to the class Vermes of the Animalia. Due to the limited tools — the sole references for this group were shape, behaviour, and habitat — the description of genera and their classification was extremely limited, which was accentuated by the perceived lack of importance of the group.

Seven years after The Origin of Species by Charles Darwin, in 1866 Ernst Haeckel, a supporter of evolutionary theory, proposed a three-kingdom system that added the Protista as a new kingdom that contained most microscopic organisms. One of his eight major divisions of Protista was composed of the monerans (called Moneres by Haeckel), which he defined as completely structure-less and homogeneous organisms, consisting only of a piece of plasma. Haeckel's Monera included not only bacterial groups of early discovery but also several small eukaryotic organisms; in fact the genus Vibrio is the only bacterial genus explicitly assigned to the phylum, while others are mentioned indirectly, which led Copeland to speculate that Haeckel considered all bacteria to belong to the genus Vibrio, ignoring other bacterial genera. One notable exception were the members of the modern phylum Cyanobacteria, such as Nostoc, which were placed in the phylum Archephyta of Algae (vide infra: Blue-green algae).

The Neolatin noun Monera and the German noun Moneren/Moneres are derived from the ancient Greek noun moneres, which Haeckel stated meant "simple"; however, it actually means "single, solitary". Haeckel also describes the protist genus Monas in the two pages about Monera in his 1866 book. The informal name of a member of the Monera was initially moneron, but later moneran was used.

Due to its lack of features, the phylum was not fully subdivided, but the genera therein were divided into two groups:

- die Gymnomoneren (no envelope [sic.]): Gymnomonera
  - Protogenes — such as Protogenes primordialis, an unidentified amoeba (eukaryote) and not a bacterium
  - Protamaeba— an incorrectly described/fabricated species
  - Vibrio — a genus of comma-shaped bacteria first described in 1854
  - Bacterium — a genus of rod-shaped bacteria first described in 1828. Haeckel does not explicitly assign this genus to the Monera.
  - Bacillus — a genus of spore-forming rod-shaped bacteria first described in 1835 Haeckel does not explicitly assign this genus to the Monera kingdom.
  - Spirochaeta — thin spiral-shaped bacteria first described in 1835 Haeckel does not explicitly assign this genus to the Monera.
  - Spirillum — spiral-shaped bacteria first described in 1832 Haeckel does not explicitly assign this genus to the Monera.
  - etc.: Haeckel does provide a comprehensive list.
- die Lepomoneren (with envelope): Lepomonera
  - Protomonas — identified to a synonym of Monas, a flagellated protozoan, and not a bacterium. The name was reused in 1984 for an unrelated genus of bacteria.
  - Vampyrella — now classed as a eukaryote and not a bacterium.

=== Subsequent classifications ===
Like Protista, the Monera classification was not fully followed at first and several different ranks were used and located with animals, plants, protists or fungi. Furthermore, Haeckel's classification lacked specificity and was not exhaustive — it in fact covers only a few pages—, consequently a lot of confusion arose even to the point that the Monera did not contain bacterial genera and others according to Huxley. They were first recognized as a kingdom by Enderlein in 1925 (Bakterien-Cyclogenie. de Gruyter, Berlin).

The most popular scheme was created in 1859 by C. Von Nägeli who classified non-phototrophic Bacteria as the class Schizomycetes.

The class Schizomycetes was then emended by Walter Migula (along with the coinage of the genus Pseudomonas in 1894) and others. This term was in dominant use even in 1916 as reported by Robert Earle Buchanan, as it had priority over other terms such as Monera. However, starting with Ferdinand Cohn in 1872 the term bacteria (or in German Bacterien) became prominently used to informally describe this group of species without a nucleus: Bacterium was in fact a genus created in 1828 by Christian Gottfried Ehrenberg Additionally, Cohn divided the bacteria according to shape namely:

- Spherobacteria for the cocci
- Microbacteria for the short, non-filamentous rods
- Desmobacteria for the longer, filamentous rods and Spirobacteria for the spiral forms.

Successively, Cohn created the Schizophyta of Plants, which contained the non-photrophic bacteria in the family Schizomycetes and the phototrophic bacteria (blue green algae/Cyanobacteria) in the Schizophyceae This union of blue green algae and Bacteria was much later followed by Haeckel, who classified the two families in a revised phylum Monera in the Protista.

Stanier and van Neil (1941, The main outlines of bacterial classification. J Bacteriol 42: 437- 466) recognized the Kingdom Monera with two phyla, Myxophyta and Schizomycetae, the latter comprising classes Eubacteriae (3 orders), Myxobacteriae (1 order), and Spirochetae (1 order); Bisset (1962, Bacteria, 2nd ed., Livingston, London) distinguished 1 class and 4 orders: Eubacteriales, Actinomycetales, Streptomycetales, and Flexibacteriales; Orla-Jensen (1909, Die Hauptlinien des naturalischen Bakteriensystems nebst einer Ubersicht der Garungsphenomene. Zentr. Bakt. Parasitenk., II, 22: 305-346) and Bergey et al (1925, Bergey's Manual of Determinative Bacteriology, Baltimore : Williams & Wilkins Co.) with many subsequent editions) also presented classifications.

=== Rise to importance ===
The term Monera became well established in the 20s and 30s to rightfully increase the importance of the difference between species with a nucleus and without. In 1925, Édouard Chatton divided all living organisms into two sections, Prokaryotes and Eukaryotes: the Kingdom Monera being the sole member of the Prokaryotes section.

The anthropic importance of the crown group of animals, plants and fungi was hard to depose; consequently, several other megaclassification schemes ignored on the empire rank but maintained the kingdom Monera consisting of bacteria, such Copeland in 1938 and Whittaker in 1969. The latter classification system was widely followed, in which Robert Whittaker proposed a five kingdom system for classification of living organisms. Whittaker's system placed most single celled organisms into either the prokaryotic Monera or the eukaryotic Protista. The other three kingdoms in his system were the eukaryotic Fungi, Animalia, and Plantae. Whittaker, however, did not believe that all his kingdoms were monophyletic. Whittaker subdivided the kingdom into two branches containing several phyla:

- Myxomonera branch
  - Cyanophyta, now called Cyanobacteria
  - Myxobacteria
- Mastigomonera branch
  - Eubacteriae
  - Actinomycota
  - Spirochaetae

Alternative commonly followed subdivision systems were based on Gram stains. This culminated in the Gibbons and Murray classification of 1978:

- Gracilicutes (gram negative)
  - Photobacteria (photosynthetic): class Oxyphotobacteriae (water as electron acceptor, includes the order Cyanobacteriales = blue green algae, now phylum Cyanobacteria) and class Anoxyphotobacteriae (anaerobic phototrophs, orders: Rhodospirillales and Chlorobiales
  - Scotobacteria (non-photosynthetic, now the Proteobacteria and other gram negative nonphotosynthetic phyla) eg. Pseudomonas aeruginosa, Salmonella enterica, E.coli.
- Firmacutes [sic] (gram positive, subsequently corrected to Firmicutes)
  - several orders such as Bacillales and Actinomycetales (now in the phylum Actinobacteria) eg. Bacillus cerus, Streptococcus, Staphylococcus.
- Mollicutes (gram variable, e.g. Mycoplasma)
- Mendocutes (uneven gram stain, "methanogenic bacteria" now known as the Archaea)

=== Three-domain system ===
In 1977, a PNAS paper by Carl Woese and George Fox demonstrated that the archaea (initially called archaebacteria) are not significantly closer in relationship to the bacteria than they are to eukaryotes. The paper received front-page coverage in The New York Times, and great controversy initially. The conclusions have since become accepted, leading to replacement of the kingdom Monera with the two domains Bacteria and Archaea. A minority of scientists, including Thomas Cavalier-Smith, continue to reject the widely accepted division between these two groups. Cavalier-Smith has published classifications in which the archaebacteria are part of a subkingdom of the Kingdom Bacteria.

=== Blue-green algae ===
Although it was generally accepted that one could distinguish prokaryotes from eukaryotes on the basis of the presence of a nucleus, mitosis versus binary fission as a way of reproducing, size, and other traits, the monophyly of the kingdom Monera (or for that matter, whether classification should be according to phylogeny) was controversial for many decades. Although distinguishing between prokaryotes from eukaryotes as a fundamental distinction is often credited to a 1937 paper by Édouard Chatton (little noted until 1962), he did not emphasize this distinction more than other biologists of his era. Roger Stanier and C. B. van Niel believed that the bacteria (a term which at the time did not include blue-green algae) and the blue-green algae had a single origin, a conviction that culminated in Stanier writing in a letter in 1970, "I think it is now quite evident that the blue-green algae are not distinguishable from bacteria by any fundamental feature of their cellular organization". Other researchers, such as E. G. Pringsheim writing in 1949, suspected separate origins for bacteria and blue-green algae. In 1974, the influential Bergey's Manual published a new edition coining the term cyanobacteria to refer to what had been called blue-green algae, marking the acceptance of this group within the Monera.

== Summary ==
Linnaeus 1735	Haeckel 1866	Chatton 1925	Copeland 1938	Whittaker 1969	Woese et al. 1990	Cavalier-Smith 1998, 2015
2 kingdoms	3 kingdoms	2 empires	4 kingdoms	5 kingdoms	3 domains	2 empires, 6/7 kingdoms
(not treated)	Protista	Prokaryota	Monera	Monera	Bacteria	Bacteria
(not treated)	Protista	Prokaryota	Monera	Monera	Archaea	Archaea (2015)
(not treated)	Protista	Eukaryota	Protoctista	Protista	Eucarya	Protozoa*
(not treated)	Protista	Eukaryota	Protoctista	Protista	Eucarya	Chromista*
Vegetabilia	Plantae	Eukaryota	Plantae	Plantae	Eucarya	Plantae
Vegetabilia	Plantae	Eukaryota	Plantae	Fungi	Eucarya	Fungi
Animalia	Animalia	Eukaryota	Animalia	Animalia	Eucarya	Animalia	*Not a clade.

Monerans are a group of organisms having prokaryotic structure. Archaea differ from Bacteria in having a different 16S srna. They also have a different cell wall structure.

== See also ==
- Bacterial cell structure
- Endosymbiont
- Kingdom (biology)
- Prokaryote
- Eukaryote
- Symbiogenesis
