= Two-empire system =

Biological classification system

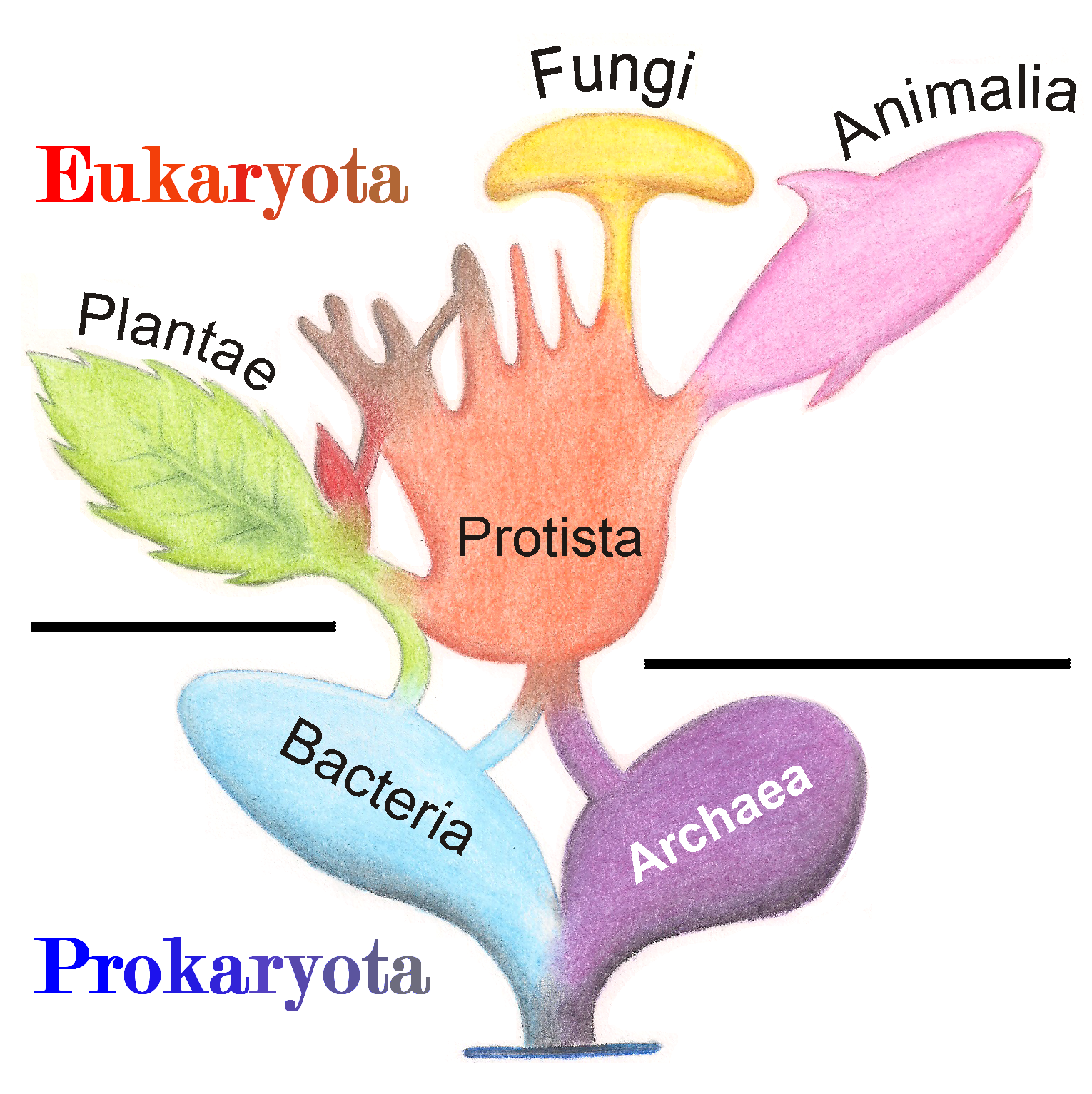
Phylogenetic and symbiogenetic tree of living organisms, showing the origins of eukaryotes and prokaryotes

The two-empire system (two-superkingdom system) was the top-level biological classification system in general use from the early 20th century until the establishment of the three-domain system (which itself is currently being challenged by the two-domain system). It classified cellular life into Prokaryota and Eukaryota as either "empires" or "superkingdoms". When the three-domain system was introduced, some biologists preferred the two-superkingdom system, claiming that the three-domain system overemphasized the division between Archaea and Bacteria. However, given the current state of knowledge and the rapid progress in biological scientific advancement, especially due to genetic analyses, that view has all but vanished.

Some prominent scientists, such as the late Thomas Cavalier-Smith, still hold and held to the two-empire system. The late Ernst Mayr, one of the 20th century's leading evolutionary biologists, wrote dismissively of the three-domain system, "I cannot see any merit at all in a three empire cladification." Additionally, the scientist Radhey Gupta argues for a return to the two-empire system, claiming that the primary division within prokaryotes should be among those surrounded by a single membrane (monoderm), including gram-positive bacteria and archaebacteria, and those with an inner and outer cell membrane (diderm), including gram-negative bacteria.

This system was preceded by Haeckel's three-kingdom system: Animalia, Plantae and Protista.

Linnaeus 1735	Haeckel 1866	Chatton 1925	Copeland 1938	Whittaker 1969	Woese et al. 1977	Woese et al. 1990	Cavalier-Smith 1993	Cavalier-Smith 1998	Ruggiero et al. 2015
—	—	2 empires	2 empires	2 empires	2 empires	3 domains	3 superkingdoms	2 empires	2 superkingdoms
2 kingdoms	3 kingdoms	—	4 kingdoms	5 kingdoms	6 kingdoms	—	8 kingdoms	6 kingdoms	7 kingdoms
—	Protista	Prokaryota	Monera	Monera	Eubacteria	Bacteria	Eubacteria	Bacteria	Bacteria
—	Protista	Prokaryota	Monera	Monera	Archaebacteria	Archaea	Archaebacteria	Bacteria	Archaea
—	Protista	Eukaryota	Protista	Protista	Protista	Eucarya	Archezoa	Protozoa	Protozoa
—	Protista	Eukaryota	Protista	Protista	Protista	Eucarya	Protozoa	Protozoa	Protozoa
—	Protista	Eukaryota	Protista	Protista	Protista	Eucarya	Chromista	Chromista	Chromista
Vegetabilia	Plantae	Eukaryota	Plantae	Plantae	Plantae	Eucarya	Plantae	Plantae	Plantae
Vegetabilia	Plantae	Eukaryota	Plantae	Fungi	Fungi	Eucarya	Fungi	Fungi	Fungi
Animalia	Animalia	Eukaryota	Animalia	Animalia	Animalia	Eucarya	Animalia	Animalia	Animalia

== See also ==
- Two-domain system (merge)
- Domain (taxonomy)
- Kingdom (taxonomy)
- Three-domain system
