= Mark Wheelis =

American biologist and professor in Biological Sciences

Mark L. Wheelis is an American microbiologist. Wheelis is currently a professor in the College of Biological Sciences, University of California, Davis. Carl Woese and Otto Kandler with Wheelis wrote the important paper Towards a natural system of organisms: proposal for the domains Archaea, Bacteria, and Eucarya that proposed a change from the Two-empire system of Prokaryotes and Eukaryotes to the Three-domain system of the domains Eukaryota, Bacteria and Archaea.

Wheelis's research interests include the history of biological warfare. He co-authored (with Larry Gonick) The Cartoon Guide to Genetics (1983). Wheelis provided the scientific knowledge and text, while Gonick contributed the illustrations and humor.

== Works ==
- Larry Gonick & Mark Wheelis, The Cartoon Guide to Genetics, Longman Higher Education, 1983, 216 pp.
- "Biological Warfare before 1914", In: Geissler E, Moon JEvC, editors. Biological and toxin weapons: research, development and use from the Middle Ages to 1945. London: Oxford University Press; 1999. pp 8–34.
