= Archezoa =

Proposed biological kingdom

In biology, Archezoa is a term that has been introduced by several authors to refer to a group of organisms (a taxon). Authors include Josef Anton Maximilian Perty, Ernst Haeckel and in the 20th century by Thomas Cavalier-Smith in his classification system. Each author used the name to refer to categories of organisms described by different sets of shared characteristics. This reuse by later authors of the same taxon name for different groups of organisms is problematic in taxonomy because the inclusion of the name in a sentence such as "Archezoa have no olfactory organs" does not make sense unless the particular usage is specified: "Archezoa sensu Cavalier-Smith (1987) have no olfactory organs"; As a result, all uses of Archezoa are now obsolete.

== Archezoa sensu Cavalier-Smith (1987) ==
Cavalier-Smith proposed the term Archezoa for a paraphyletic territory of eukaryotes that primitively lacked mitochondria. Like Margulis and others before (see Pelomyxa), Cavalier-Smith argued that the initial ancestor of eukaryotes emerged prior to the acquisition of mitochondria via endosymbiosis. The same paraphyletic territory was referred to as Hypochondria by others. The argument for Archezoa sensu Cavalier-Smith was never universally accepted because of conflicting information, and was dropped when the contrary argument, that amitochondriates were descendants of eukaryotes with mitochondria, became dominant.

Eukaryotes that eventually acquired a bacterial endosymbiont that became the mitochondria were placed in a taxonomic group which Cavalier-Smith called the Metakaryota, whereas the Archezoa represented an earlier paraphyletic group to which Cavalier-Smith variously assigned the diplomonads, Entamoeba, Microsporidia, oxymonads, parabasalids, Pelomyxa, retortamonads, trichomonads, and Trimastix (see Cavalier-Smith's system of classification). With the rejection of Archeozoa, the meaning of the term Metakaryota became the same as Eukaryota, and Metakaryota became superfluous.

== Original mitochondria lost ==
Eukaryotic protists lacking mitochondria were discovered to have experienced secondary mitochondrial loss, meaning that their ancestors once possessed mitochondria but that these mitochondria had, over time, been transformed, reduced, or lost. In some of these organisms, mitochondria had degraded into simpler double-membrane bound organelles known as mitosomes and hydrogenosomes. Some of both types of organelles are known to have fully lost their genome.

Initial discoveries found that amitochondriate organisms appeared to express mitochondrial Hsp60 and Hsp70 proteins from the nuclear DNA of the organism. This indicated that the ancestors of these organisms once possessed mitochondria which expressed these proteins, but that these genes had migrated to their nuclear DNA over time as a result of endosymbiotic gene transfer.

As a result, the argument that some extant eukaryotes lacking mitochondria had emerged from the eukaryotic lineage before mitochondria were acquired was falsified.

== Long branch attraction ==
An argument for the Archezoa group was that amitochondriate protists appeared to branch off early on from the eukaryotic lineage in phylogenetic analyses. This corroborated the supposition that Archezoa were more closely linked to primitive eukaryotes that evolved prior to the endosymbiotic process that generated the mitochondria. However, this early divergence later turned out to be a class of systematic errors in phylogenetic analysis called "long branch attraction".
