= Taxonomy (biology) =

Science of classifying organisms

In biology, taxonomy (from Ancient Greek τάξις (taxis) 'arrangement' and -νομία (-nomia) 'method') is the scientific study of naming, defining (circumscribing) and classifying groups of biological organisms based on shared characteristics. Modern approaches prioritize common ancestry and evolutionary relationships. Organisms are grouped into taxa (singular: taxon), and these groups are given a taxonomic rank; groups of a given rank can be aggregated to form a more inclusive group of higher rank, thus creating a taxonomic hierarchy. The principal ranks in modern use are domain, kingdom, phylum (division is sometimes used in botany in place of phylum), class, order, family, genus, and species. The Swedish botanist Carl Linnaeus is regarded as the founder of the current system of taxonomy, having developed a ranked system known as Linnaean taxonomy for categorizing organisms.

With advances in the theory, data and analytical technology of biological systematics, the Linnaean system has transformed into a system of modern biological classification intended to reflect the evolutionary relationships among organisms, both living and extinct.

== Definition ==
The exact definition of taxonomy varies from source to source, but the core of the discipline remains: the conception, naming, and classification of groups of organisms. As points of reference, recent definitions of taxonomy are presented below:

1. Theory and practice of grouping individuals into species, arranging species into larger groups, and giving those groups names, thus producing a classification.
2. A field of science (and a major component of systematics) that encompasses description, identification, nomenclature, and classification
3. The science of classification, in biology the arrangement of organisms into a classification
4. "The science of classification as applied to living organisms, including the study of means of formation of species, etc."
5. "The analysis of an organism's characteristics for the purpose of classification"
6. "Systematics studies phylogeny to provide a pattern that can be translated into the classification and names of the more inclusive field of taxonomy" (listed as a desirable but unusual definition)

The varied definitions either place taxonomy as a sub-area of systematics (definition 2), invert that relationship (definition 6), or appear to consider the two terms synonymous. There is some disagreement as to whether biological nomenclature is considered a part of taxonomy (definitions 1 and 2), or a part of systematics outside taxonomy. For example, definition 6 is paired with the following definition of systematics that places nomenclature outside taxonomy:

- Systematics: "The study of the identification, taxonomy, and nomenclature of organisms, including the classification of living things with regard to their natural relationships and the study of variation and the evolution of taxa".

In 1970, Michener et al. defined "systematic biology" and "taxonomy" in relation to one another as follows:

Systematic biology (hereafter called simply systematics) is the field that

- (a) provides scientific names for organisms,
- (b) describes them,
- (c) preserves collections of them,
- (d) provides classifications for the organisms, keys for their identification, and data on their distributions,
- (e) investigates their evolutionary histories, and
- (f) considers their environmental adaptations.

This is a field with a long history that in recent years has experienced a notable renaissance, principally with respect to theoretical content. Part of the theoretical material has to do with evolutionary areas (topics e and f above), the rest relates especially to the problem of classification. Taxonomy is that part of Systematics concerned with topics (a) to (d) above.

A whole set of terms including taxonomy, systematic biology, systematics, scientific classification, biological classification, and phylogenetics have at times had overlapping meanings – sometimes the same, sometimes slightly different, but always related and intersecting. The broadest meaning of "taxonomy" is used here. The term itself was introduced in 1813 by de Candolle, in his Théorie élémentaire de la botanique. John Lindley provided an early definition of systematics in 1830, although he wrote of "systematic botany" rather than using the term "systematics". Europeans tend to use the terms "systematics" and "biosystematics" for the study of biodiversity as a whole, whereas North Americans tend to use "taxonomy" more frequently. However, taxonomy, and in particular alpha taxonomy, is more specifically the identification, description, and naming (i.e., nomenclature) of organisms, while "classification" focuses on placing organisms within hierarchical groups that show their relationships to other organisms.

=== Monograph and taxonomic revision ===
A taxonomic revision or taxonomic review is a novel analysis of the variation patterns in a particular taxon. This analysis may be executed on the basis of any combination of the various available kinds of characters, such as morphological, anatomical, palynological, biochemical and genetic. A monograph or complete revision is a revision that is comprehensive for a taxon for the information given at a particular time, and for the entire world. Other (partial) revisions may be restricted in the sense that they may only use some of the available character sets or have a limited spatial scope. A revision results in a conformation of or new insights in the relationships between the subtaxa within the taxon under study, which may lead to a change in the classification of these subtaxa, the identification of new subtaxa, or the merger of previous subtaxa.

=== Taxonomic characters ===
Taxonomic characters are the taxonomic attributes that can be used to provide the evidence from which relationships (the phylogeny) between taxa are inferred. Kinds of taxonomic characters include:

- Morphological characters
  - General external morphology
  - Special structures (e.g., genitalia)
  - Internal morphology (anatomy)
  - Embryology
  - Karyology and other cytological factors
- Physiological characters
  - Metabolic factors
  - Body secretions
  - Genic sterility factors
- Molecular characters
  - Immunological distance
  - Electrophoretic differences
  - Amino acid sequences of proteins
  - DNA hybridization
  - DNA and RNA sequences
  - Restriction endonuclease analyses
  - Other molecular differences
- Behavioral characters
  - Courtship and other ethological isolating mechanisms
  - Other behavior patterns
- Ecological characters
  - Habit and habitats
  - Food
  - Seasonal variations
  - Parasites and hosts
- Geographic characters
  - General biogeographic distribution patterns
  - Sympatric-allopatric relationship of populations

=== Alpha and beta taxonomy ===
The term "alpha taxonomy" is primarily used to refer to the discipline of finding, describing, and naming taxa, particularly species. In earlier literature, the term had a different meaning, referring to morphological taxonomy, and the products of research through the end of the 19th century.

William Bertram Turrill introduced the term "alpha taxonomy" in a series of papers published in 1935 and 1937 in which he discussed the philosophy and possible future directions of the discipline of taxonomy.

... there is an increasing desire amongst taxonomists to consider their problems from wider viewpoints, to investigate the possibilities of closer co-operation with their cytological, ecological and genetics colleagues and to acknowledge that some revision or expansion, perhaps of a drastic nature, of their aims and methods, may be desirable ... Turrill (1935) has suggested that while accepting the older invaluable taxonomy, based on structure, and conveniently designated "alpha", it is possible to glimpse a far-distant taxonomy built upon as wide a basis of morphological and physiological facts as possible, and one in which "place is found for all observational and experimental data relating, even if indirectly, to the constitution, subdivision, origin, and behaviour of species and other taxonomic groups". Ideals can, it may be said, never be completely realized. They have, however, a great value of acting as permanent stimulants, and if we have some, even vague, ideal of an "omega" taxonomy we may progress a little way down the Greek alphabet. Some of us please ourselves by thinking we are now groping in a "beta" taxonomy.

Turrill thus explicitly excludes from alpha taxonomy various areas of study that he includes within taxonomy as a whole, such as ecology, physiology, genetics, and cytology. He further excludes phylogenetic reconstruction from alpha taxonomy.

Later authors have used the term in a different sense, to mean the delimitation of species (not subspecies or taxa of other ranks), using whatever investigative techniques are available, and including sophisticated computational or laboratory techniques. Thus, Ernst Mayr in 1968 defined "beta taxonomy" as the classification of ranks higher than species.

An understanding of the biological meaning of variation and of the evolutionary origin of groups of related species is even more important for the second stage of taxonomic activity, the sorting of species into groups of relatives ("taxa") and their arrangement in a hierarchy of higher categories. This activity is what the term classification denotes; it is also referred to as "beta taxonomy".

=== Microtaxonomy and macrotaxonomy ===
How species should be defined in a particular group of organisms gives rise to practical and theoretical problems that are referred to as the species problem. The scientific work of deciding how to define species has been called microtaxonomy. By extension, macrotaxonomy is the study of groups at the higher taxonomic ranks subgenus and above, or simply in clades that include more than one taxon considered a species, expressed in terms of phylogenetic nomenclature.

== History ==
While some descriptions of taxonomic history attempt to date taxonomy to ancient civilizations, a truly scientific attempt to classify organisms did not occur until the 18th century, with the possible exception of Aristotle, whose works hint at a taxonomy. Earlier works were primarily descriptive and focused on plants that were useful in agriculture or medicine.

There are a number of stages in this scientific thinking. Early taxonomy was based on arbitrary criteria, the so-called "artificial systems", including Linnaeus's system of sexual classification for plants (Linnaeus's 1735 classification of animals was entitled "Systema Naturae" ("the System of Nature"), implying that he, at least, believed that it was more than an "artificial system").

Later came systems based on a more complete consideration of the characteristics of taxa, referred to as "natural systems", such as those of de Jussieu (1789), de Candolle (1813) and Bentham and Hooker (1862–1863). These classifications described empirical patterns and were pre-evolutionary in thinking.

The publication of Charles Darwin's On the Origin of Species (1859) led to a new explanation for classifications, based on evolutionary relationships. This was the concept of phyletic systems, from 1883 onwards. This approach was typified by those of Eichler (1883) and Engler (1886–1892).

The advent of cladistic methodology in the 1970s led to classifications based on the sole criterion of monophyly, supported by the presence of synapomorphies. Since then, the evidentiary basis has been expanded with data from molecular genetics that for the most part complements traditional morphology.

=== Pre-Linnaean ===
==== Early taxonomists ====
Naming and classifying human surroundings likely began with the onset of language. Distinguishing poisonous plants from edible plants is integral to the survival of human communities. Medicinal plant illustrations show up in Egyptian wall paintings from c. 1500 BC, indicating that the uses of different species were understood and that a basic taxonomy was in place.

==== Ancient times ====
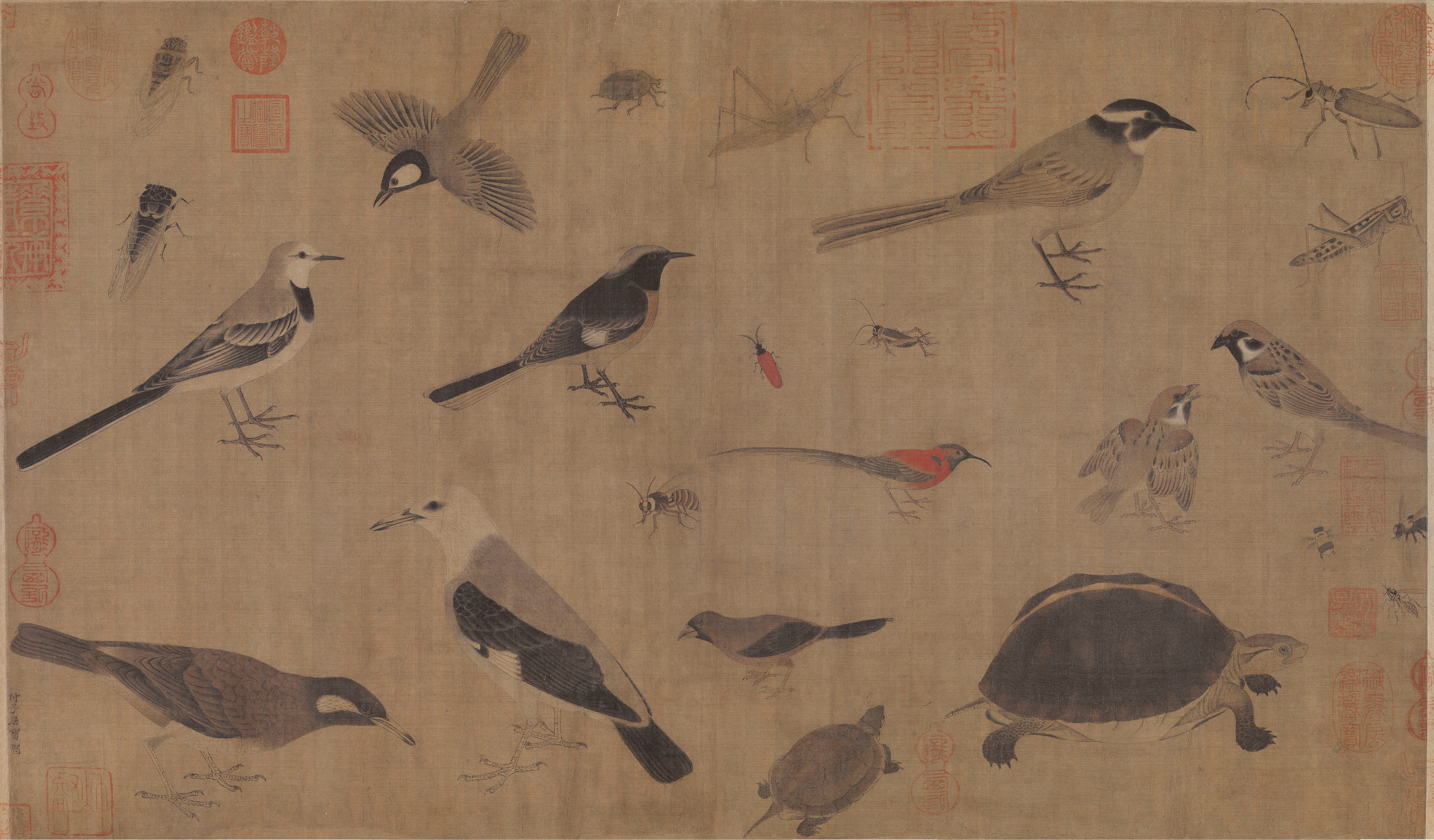
Description of rare animals (写生珍禽图), by Song dynasty painter Huang Quan (903–965)

Organisms were first classified by Aristotle (Ancient Greece, 384–322 BC) during his stay on the island of Lesbos. He classified beings by their parts, or in modern terms attributes, such as having live birth, having four legs, laying eggs, having blood, or being warm-bodied. He divided all living things into two groups: plants and animals.

Some of his groups of animals, such as Anhaima (animals without blood, translated as invertebrates) and Enhaima (animals with blood, roughly the vertebrates), as well as groups like the sharks and cetaceans, are commonly used.

His student Theophrastus (Greece, 370–285 BC) carried on this tradition, mentioning some 500 plants and their uses in his Historia Plantarum. Several plant genera can be traced back to Theophrastus, such as Cornus, Crocus, and Narcissus.

==== Medieval ====
Taxonomy in the Middle Ages was largely based on the Aristotelian system, with additions concerning the philosophical and existential order of creatures. This included concepts such as the great chain of being in the Western scholastic tradition, again deriving ultimately from Aristotle.

The Aristotelian system did not classify plants or fungi, due to the lack of microscopes at the time, as his ideas were based on arranging the complete world in a single continuum, as per the scala naturae (the Natural Ladder). This, as well, was taken into consideration in the great chain of being.

Advances were made by scholars such as Procopius, Timotheus of Gaza, Demetrios Pepagomenos, and Thomas Aquinas. Medieval thinkers used abstract philosophical and logical categorizations more suited to abstract philosophy than to pragmatic taxonomy. In the Muslim world, Al-Damiri (d. 1405) wrote an influential work called Life of Animals (Ḥayāt al-ḥayawān al-kubrā, c.1371) which treats in alphabetic order of 931 animals mentioned in the Quran, the traditions and the poetic and proverbial literature of the Arabs.

==== Renaissance and early modern ====
During the Renaissance and the Age of Enlightenment, categorizing organisms became more prevalent, and taxonomic works became ambitious enough to replace the ancient texts. This is sometimes credited to the development of sophisticated optical lenses, which allowed the morphology of organisms to be studied in much greater detail. One of the earliest authors to take advantage of this leap in technology was the Italian physician Andrea Cesalpino (1519–1603), who has been called "the first taxonomist". His magnum opus De Plantis came out in 1583, and described more than 1,500 plant species. Two large plant families that he first recognized are still in use: the Asteraceae and Brassicaceae.

In the 17th century, John Ray (England, 1627–1705) wrote many important taxonomic works. Arguably his greatest accomplishment was Methodus Plantarum Nova (1682), in which he published details of over 18,000 plant species. At the time, his classifications were perhaps the most complex yet produced by any taxonomist, as he based his taxa on many combined characters.

The next major taxonomic works were produced by Joseph Pitton de Tournefort (France, 1656–1708). His work from 1700, Institutiones Rei Herbariae, included more than 9,000 species in 698 genera, which directly influenced Linnaeus, as it was the text he used as a young student.

=== Linnaean era ===
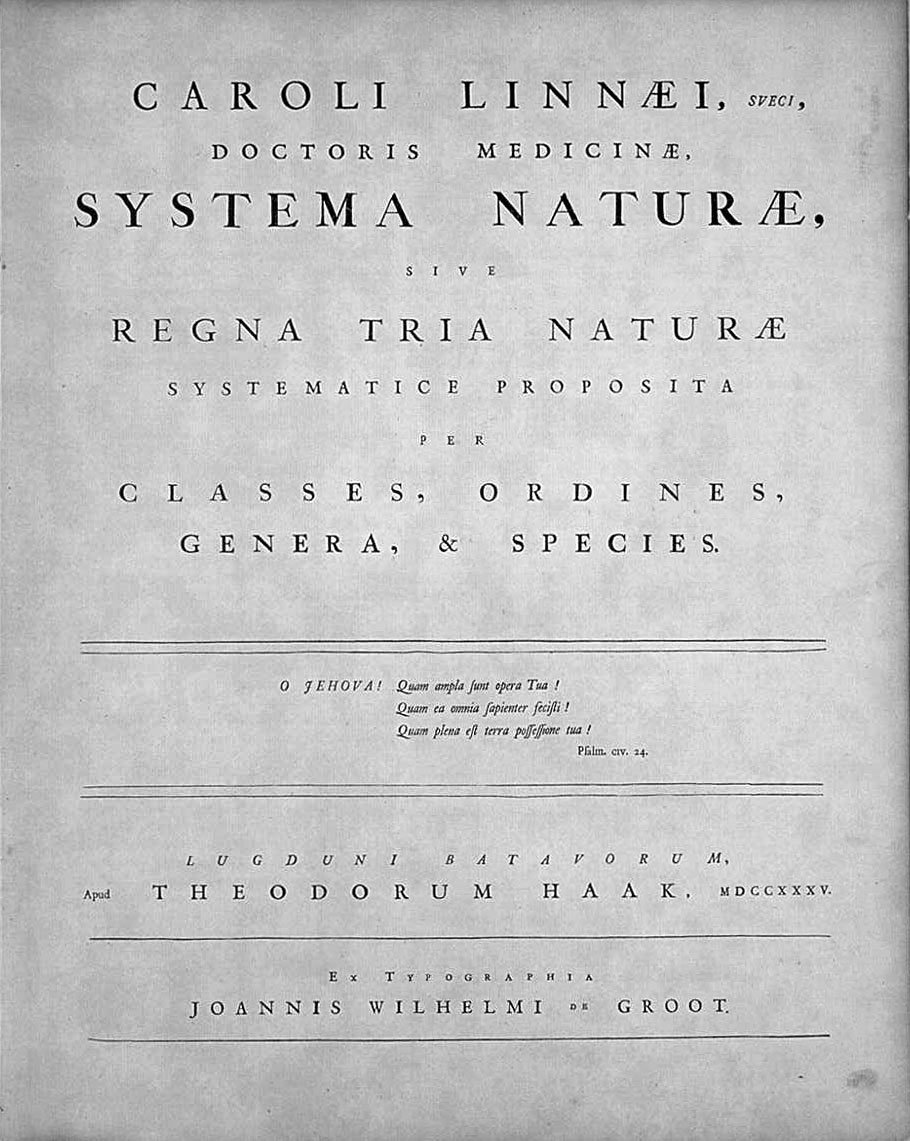
Title page of Systema Naturae, Leiden, 1735

The Swedish botanist Carl Linnaeus (1707–1778) ushered in a new era of taxonomy. With his major works Systema Naturae 1st Edition in 1735, Species Plantarum in 1753, and Systema Naturae 10th Edition, he revolutionized modern taxonomy. His works implemented a standardized binomial naming system for animal and plant species, which proved to be an elegant solution to a chaotic and disorganized taxonomic literature. He not only introduced the standard of class, order, genus, and species, but also made it possible to identify plants and animals from his book, by using the smaller parts of the flower (known as the Linnaean system).

Plant and animal taxonomists regard Linnaeus' work as the "starting point" for valid names (at 1753 and 1758 respectively). Names published before these dates are referred to as "pre-Linnaean", and not considered valid (with the exception of spiders published in Svenska Spindlar). Even taxonomic names published by Linnaeus himself before these dates are considered pre-Linnaean.

== Modern system of classification ==
Evolution of the vertebrates at class level, width of spindles indicating number of families. Spindle diagrams are typical for evolutionary taxonomy.

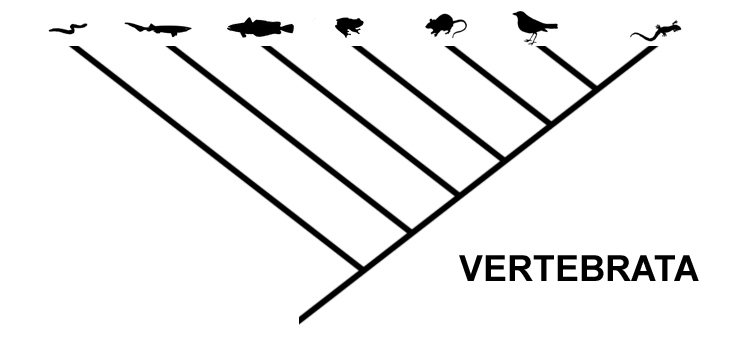
The same relationship, expressed as a cladogram typical for cladistics

A pattern of groups nested within groups was specified by Linnaeus' classifications of plants and animals, and these patterns began to be represented as dendrograms of the animal and plant kingdoms toward the end of the 18th century, well before Charles Darwin's On the Origin of Species was published. The pattern of the "Natural System" did not entail a generating process, such as evolution, but may have implied it, inspiring early transmutationist thinkers. Among early works exploring the idea of a transmutation of species were Zoonomia in 1796 by Erasmus Darwin (Charles Darwin's grandfather), and Jean-Baptiste Lamarck's Philosophie zoologique of 1809. The idea was popularized in the Anglophone world by the speculative but widely read Vestiges of the Natural History of Creation, published anonymously by Robert Chambers in 1844.

With Darwin's theory, a general acceptance quickly appeared that a classification should reflect the Darwinian principle of common descent. Tree of life representations became popular in scientific works, with known fossil groups incorporated. One of the first modern groups tied to fossil ancestors was birds. Using the then newly discovered fossils of Archaeopteryx and Hesperornis, Thomas Henry Huxley pronounced that they had evolved from dinosaurs, a group formally named by Richard Owen in 1842. The resulting description, that of dinosaurs "giving rise to" or being "the ancestors of" birds, is the essential hallmark of evolutionary taxonomic thinking. As more and more fossil groups were found and recognized in the late 19th and early 20th centuries, palaeontologists worked to understand the history of animals through the ages by linking together known groups. With the modern evolutionary synthesis of the early 1940s, an essentially modern understanding of the evolution of the major groups was in place. As evolutionary taxonomy is based on Linnaean taxonomic ranks, the two terms are largely interchangeable in modern use.

The cladistic method has emerged since the 1960s. In 1958, Julian Huxley used the term clade. Later, in 1960, Cain and Harrison introduced the term cladistic. The salient feature is arranging taxa in a hierarchical evolutionary tree, with the desired objective of all named taxa being monophyletic. A taxon is called monophyletic if it includes all the descendants of an ancestral form. Groups that have descendant groups removed from them are termed paraphyletic, while groups representing more than one branch from the tree of life are called polyphyletic. Monophyletic groups are recognized and diagnosed on the basis of synapomorphies, shared derived character states.

Cladistic classifications are compatible with traditional Linnean taxonomy and the Codes of Zoological and Botanical nomenclature, to a certain extent. An alternative system of nomenclature, the International Code of Phylogenetic Nomenclature or PhyloCode has been proposed, which regulates the formal naming of clades. Linnaean ranks are optional and have no formal standing under the PhyloCode, which is intended to coexist with the current, rank-based codes. While popularity of phylogenetic nomenclature has grown steadily in the last few decades, it remains to be seen whether a majority of systematists will eventually adopt the PhyloCode or continue using the current systems of nomenclature that have been employed (and modified, but arguably not as much as some systematists wish) for over 250 years.

== Kingdoms and domains ==
The basic scheme of modern classification. Many other levels can be used; domain, the highest level within life, is both new and disputed.

Domains are a relatively new grouping. First proposed in 1977, Carl Woese's three-domain system was not generally accepted until later. One main characteristic of the three-domain method is the separation of Archaea and Bacteria, previously grouped into the single kingdom Bacteria (a kingdom also sometimes called Monera), with the Eukaryota for all organisms whose cells contain a nucleus. A small number of scientists include a sixth kingdom, Archaea, but do not accept the domain method.

Thomas Cavalier-Smith, who published extensively on the classification of protists, in 2002 proposed that the Neomura, the clade that groups together the Archaea and Eucarya, would have evolved from Bacteria, more precisely from Actinomycetota. His 2004 classification treated the archaeobacteria as part of a subkingdom of the kingdom Bacteria, i.e., he rejected the three-domain system entirely. Stefan Luketa in 2012 proposed a five "dominion" system, adding Prionobiota (acellular and without nucleic acid) and Virusobiota (acellular but with nucleic acid) to the traditional three domains.

Linnaeus 1735	Haeckel 1866	Chatton 1925	Copeland 1938	Whittaker 1969	Woese et al. 1990	Cavalier-Smith 1998, 2015
2 kingdoms	3 kingdoms	2 empires	4 kingdoms	5 kingdoms	3 domains	2 empires, 6/7 kingdoms
(not treated)	Protista	Prokaryota	Monera	Monera	Bacteria	Bacteria
(not treated)	Protista	Prokaryota	Monera	Monera	Archaea	Archaea (2015)
(not treated)	Protista	Eukaryota	Protoctista	Protista	Eucarya	Protozoa*
(not treated)	Protista	Eukaryota	Protoctista	Protista	Eucarya	Chromista*
Vegetabilia	Plantae	Eukaryota	Plantae	Plantae	Eucarya	Plantae
Vegetabilia	Plantae	Eukaryota	Plantae	Fungi	Eucarya	Fungi
Animalia	Animalia	Eukaryota	Animalia	Animalia	Eucarya	Animalia	*Not a clade.

=== Recent comprehensive classifications ===
Partial classifications exist for many individual groups of organisms and are revised and replaced as new information becomes available; however, comprehensive, published treatments of most or all life are rarer; recent examples are that of Adl et al., 2012 and 2019, which covers eukaryotes only with an emphasis on protists, and Ruggiero et al., 2015, covering both eukaryotes and prokaryotes to the rank of Order, although both exclude fossil representatives. A separate compilation (Ruggiero, 2014) covers extant taxa to the rank of Family. Other, database-driven treatments include the Encyclopedia of Life, the Global Biodiversity Information Facility, the NCBI taxonomy database, the Interim Register of Marine and Nonmarine Genera, the Open Tree of Life, and the Catalogue of Life. The Paleobiology Database is a resource for fossils.

== Application ==
Biological taxonomy is a sub-discipline of biology, and is generally practiced by biologists known as "taxonomists", although enthusiastic naturalists are also frequently involved in the publication of new taxa. Because taxonomy aims to describe and organize life, the work conducted by taxonomists is essential for the study of biodiversity and the resulting field of conservation biology.

=== Classifying organisms ===
Biological classification is a critical component of the taxonomic process. As a result, it informs the user as to what the relatives of the taxon are hypothesized to be. Biological classification uses taxonomic ranks, including among others (in order from most inclusive to least inclusive): domain, kingdom, phylum, class, order, family, genus, species, and strain. (Note: This ranking system, except for "Strain", can be remembered by the mnemonic "Do Kings Play Chess On Fine Glass Sets?".)

=== Enigmatic taxa ===
Enigmatic taxa are taxonomic groups whose broader relationships are unknown or undefined. This uncertainty about its taxonomic classification can be problematic when formally naming a taxon. However some codes have provisions to address this. For example, the International Code of Nomenclature for algae, fungi, and plants, stipulates that "species and subdivisions of genera must be assigned to genera, and infraspecific taxa must be assigned to species, because their names are combinations", but ranks higher than the genus may be assigned incertae sedis.

=== Taxonomic descriptions ===
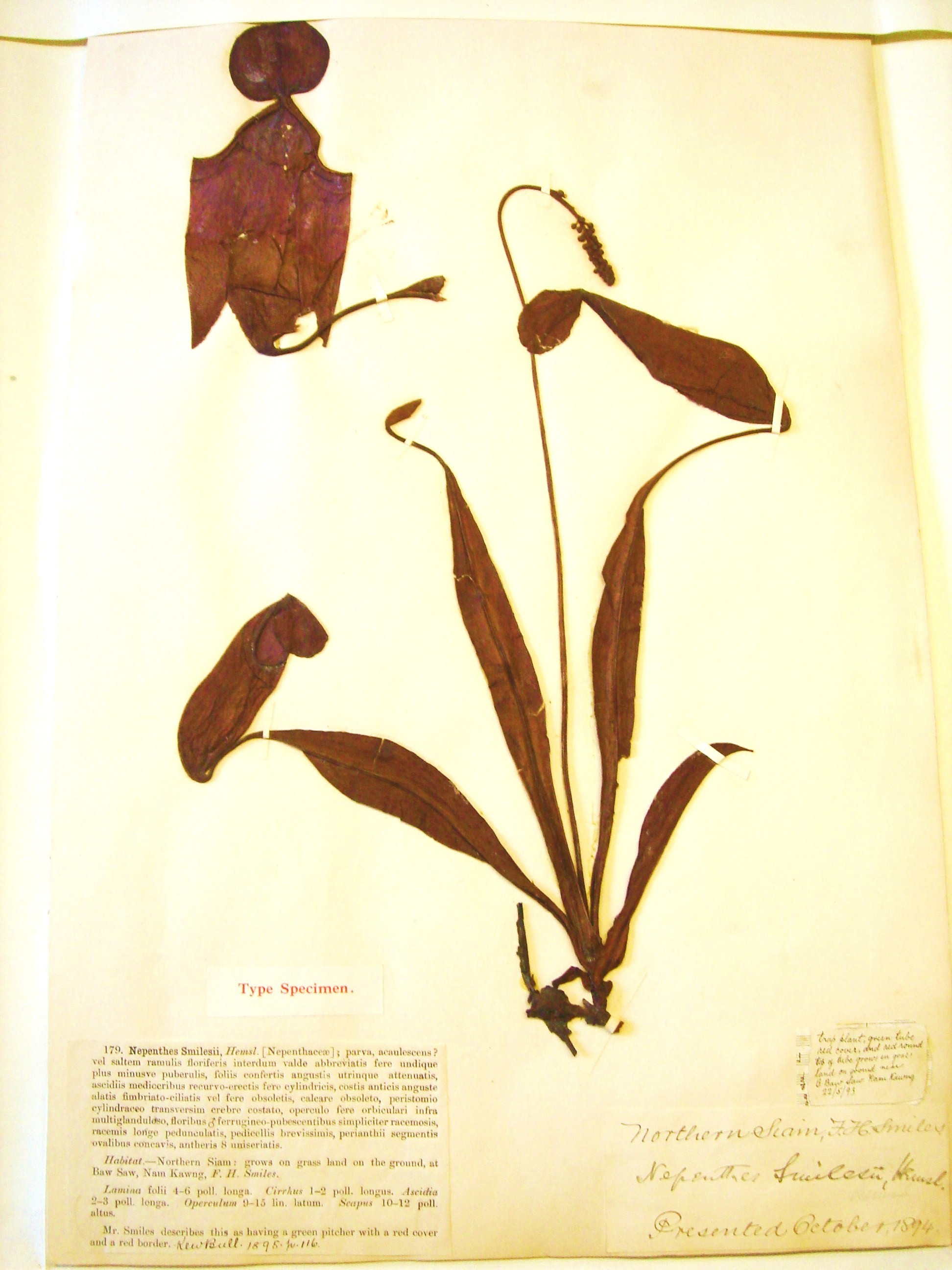
Type specimen for Nepenthes smilesii, a tropical pitcher plant

The "definition" of a taxon is encapsulated by its description or its diagnosis or by both combined. There are no set rules governing the definition of taxa, but the naming and publication of new taxa is governed by sets of rules. In zoology, the nomenclature for the more commonly used ranks (superfamily to subspecies), is regulated by the International Code of Zoological Nomenclature (ICZN Code). In the fields of phycology, mycology, and botany, the naming of taxa is governed by the International Code of Nomenclature for algae, fungi, and plants (ICN).

The initial description of a taxon involves five main requirements:

1. The taxon must be given a name based on the 26 letters of the Latin alphabet (a binomial for new species, or uninomial for other ranks).
2. The name must be unique (i.e. not a homonym).
3. The description must be based on at least one name-bearing type specimen.
4. It should include statements about appropriate attributes either to describe (define) the taxon or to differentiate it from other taxa (the diagnosis, ICZN Code, Article 13.1.1, ICN, Article 38, which may or may not be based on morphology). Both codes deliberately separate defining the content of a taxon (its circumscription) from defining its name.
5. These first four requirements must be published in a work that is obtainable in numerous identical copies, as a permanent scientific record.

However, often much more information is included, like the geographic range of the taxon, ecological notes, chemistry, behavior, etc. How researchers arrive at their taxa varies: depending on the available data, and resources, methods vary from simple quantitative or qualitative comparisons of striking features, to elaborate computer analyses of large amounts of DNA sequence data.

=== Author citation ===
An "authority" may be placed after a scientific name. The authority is the name of the scientist or scientists who first validly published the name. For example, in 1758, Linnaeus gave the Asian elephant the scientific name Elephas maximus, so the name is sometimes written as "Elephas maximus Linnaeus, 1758". The names of authors are often abbreviated: the abbreviation L., for Linnaeus, is commonly used. In botany, there is, in fact, a regulated list of standard abbreviations (see list of botanists by author abbreviation). The system for assigning authorities differs slightly between botany and zoology. However, it is standard that if the genus of a species has been changed since the original description, the original authority's name is placed in parentheses.

== Phenetics ==
A comparison of phylogenetic and phenetic (character-based) concepts

In phenetics, also known as taximetrics, or numerical taxonomy, organisms are classified based on overall similarity, regardless of their phylogeny or evolutionary relationships. It results in a measure of hypergeometric "distance" between taxa. Phenetic methods have become relatively rare in modern times, largely superseded by cladistic analyses, as phenetic methods do not distinguish shared ancestral (or plesiomorphic) traits from shared derived (or apomorphic) traits. However, certain phenetic methods, such as neighbor joining, have persisted, as rapid estimators of relationships when more advanced methods (such as Bayesian inference) are too computationally expensive.

== Databases ==
Modern taxonomy uses database technologies to search and catalogue classifications and their documentation. While there is no commonly used database, there are comprehensive databases such as the Catalogue of Life, which attempts to list every documented species. The catalogue listed 1.64 million species for all kingdoms as of April 2016, claiming coverage of more than three-quarters of the estimated species known to modern science.

== See also ==
- Automated species identification – Taxonomic AI processes
- Bacterial taxonomy – Rank based classification of bacteria
- Cladogram – Diagram used to show relations among groups of organisms with common origins
- Classification – Putting things into categories
- Cluster analysis – Grouping a set of objects by similarity
- Consortium for the Barcode of Life – Organization for DNA barcoding as a global standard for species identification
- Consortium of European Taxonomic Facilities – European research network
- Dendrogram – Diagram with a treelike structure
- Family resemblance – Philosophical idea popularized by Ludwig Wittgenstein
- Folk taxonomy – Vernacular, as opposed to scientific, naming system
- Genetypes – Concept in genetic science
- Glossary of scientific naming
- Identification (biology) – Process of taking existing name to single organisms
- Incertae sedis – Term to indicate an uncertain taxonomic position
- Numerical taxonomy – Classification system in biological systematics
- Open Tree of Life – Online phylogenetic tree of life
- Parataxonomy
- Phenetics (or Taximetrics) – Attempt to classify organisms based on overall similarity
- Phenogram
- Prototype theory – Theory of categorization in psychology
- Set theory – Branch of mathematics that studies sets
- Systema Naturae – Major work by botanist Carolus Linnaeus
- Taximetrics (or Phenetics) – Attempt to classify organisms based on overall similarity
- Taxonomy (general) – Development of classes and classifications
- Virus classification – Organisation of viruses into a taxonomic system

== Bibliography ==
- Datta, Subhash Chandra (1988). Systematic Botany (4 ed.). New Delhi: New Age International. ISBN 978-81-224-0013-7. Archived from the original on 13 November 2023.
- Stace, Clive A. (1989) [1980]. Plant taxonomy and biosystematics (2nd. ed.). Cambridge: Cambridge University Press. ISBN 978-0-521-42785-2. Archived from the original on 13 January 2023.
- Stuessy, Tod F. (2009). Plant Taxonomy: The Systematic Evaluation of Comparative Data. Columbia University Press. ISBN 978-0-231-14712-5. Archived from the original on 13 November 2023.
- Turrill, W. B. (1938). "The Expansion Of Taxonomy With Special Reference To Spermatophyta". Biological Reviews. 13 (4): 342–373. Bibcode:1938BioRv..13..342T. doi:10.1111/j.1469-185X.1938.tb00522.x. S2CID 84905335.
- Wiley, Edward O.; Lieberman, Bruce S. (2011). Phylogenetics: Theory and Practice of Phylogenetic Systematics (2nd ed.). John Wiley & Sons. ISBN 978-0-470-90596-8.
