= C16orf78 =

Protein-coding gene in humans

Identifiers
- Aliases: C16orf78, chromosome 16 open reading frame 78
- External IDs: MGI: 3607717; GeneCards: C16orf78

Gene location (Human)
Chr.	Chromosome 16 (human)
Band	16q12.1	Start	49,373,804 bp
Band	16q12.1	End	49,399,431 bp

Gene location (Mouse)
Chr.	Chromosome 8 (mouse)
Band	8|8 C3	Start	88,290,481 bp
Band	8|8 C3	End	88,316,052 bp
RNA expression pattern
Bgee	Human / Mouse (ortholog); Top expressed in: sperm; right testis; left testis; pancreatic ductal cell; apex of heart; respiratory system; subdivision of respiratory system; lower respiratory tract; human musculoskeletal system; lung / Top expressed in: seminiferous tubule; spermatid; spermatocyte; embryo; lens; islet of Langerhans; nucleus of brain; hypothalamus; telencephalic nucleus; basal forebrain; More reference expression data
BioGPS	n/a
Orthologs
Databases	NCBI: entry; OMA: entry
Species	Human	Mouse
Entrez	123970	330820
Ensembl	ENSG00000166152	ENSMUSG00000069971
UniProt	Q8WTQ4	Q8BHX0
RefSeq (mRNA)	NM_144602	NM_177901
RefSeq (protein)	NP_653203	NP_808569
Location (UCSC)	Chr 16: 49.37 – 49.4 Mb	Chr 8: 88.29 – 88.32 Mb
PubMed search
- Wikidata
View/Edit Human	View/Edit Mouse

Uncharacterized protein C16orf78 is a protein that in humans is encoded by the C16orf78 gene.

== Gene ==
The C16orf78 gene(123970) is located at 16q12.1 on the plus strand, spanning 25,609 bp from 49,407,734 to 49,433,342.

== mRNA ==
There is one mRNA transcript (NM_144602.3) and no other known splice isoforms. There are 5 exons, totaling a length of 1068 base pairs.

== Protein ==
=== Sequence ===
C16orf78 is 265 amino acids long with a predicted molecular weight of 30.8 kDal and pI of 9.8. It is rich in both methionine and lysine, composed of 6.4% methionine and 13.6% lysine. This methionine richness has been hypothesized to serve as a mitochondrial antioxidant.

=== Post-transnational modifications ===
There are four verified ubiquitination sites and three verified phosphorylation sites.

Diagram of C16orf78 protein with ubiquitination sites marked in red and phosphorylation sites marked in gray.

=== Structure ===
Predictions of C16orf78's secondary structure consist primarily of alpha helices and coiled coils. Phyre2 also predicted C16orf78 is primarily helical, but 253 of 265 amino acids were modeled ab initio so the confidence of the model is low.

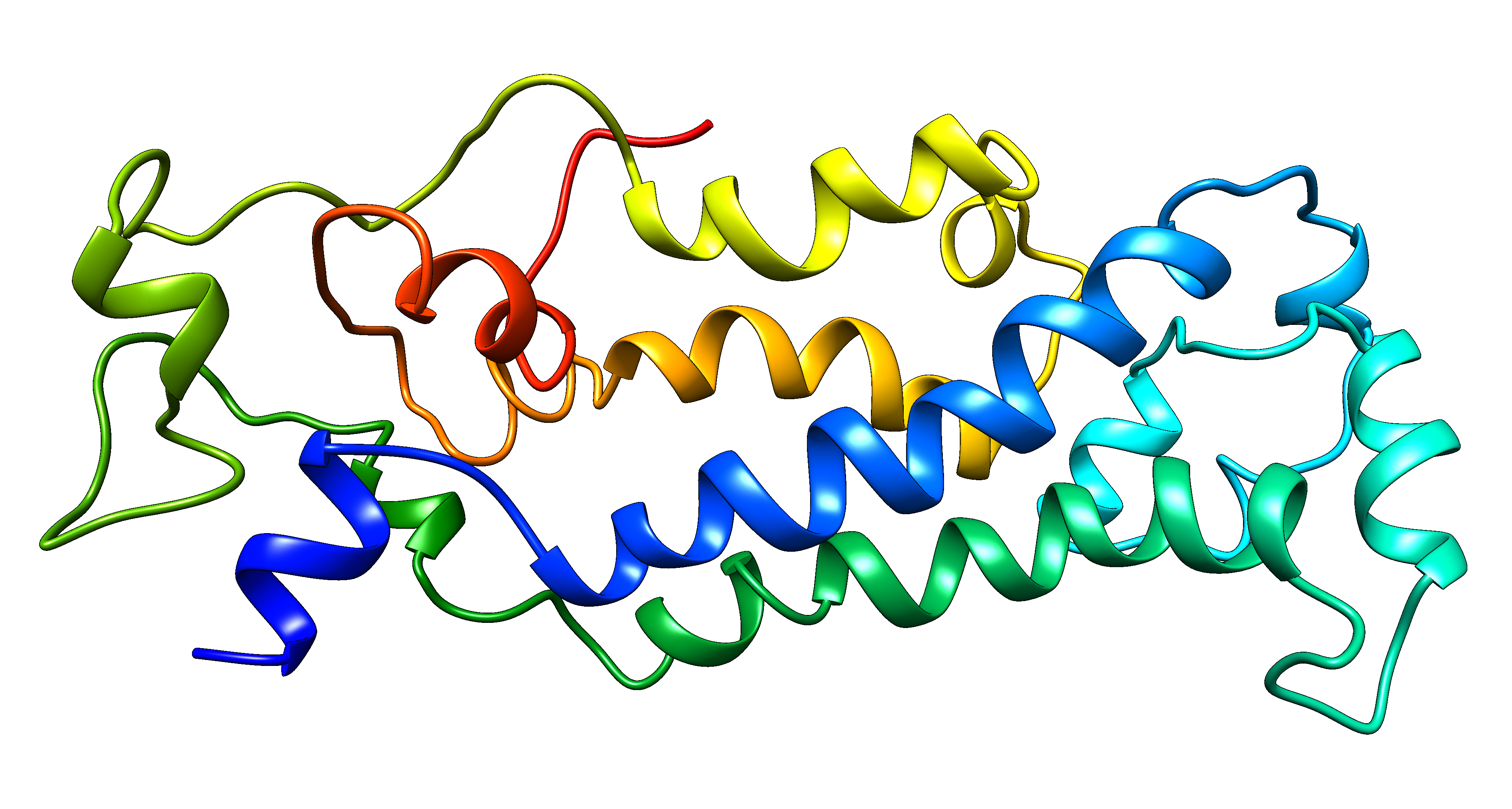
Phyre2 generated model of C16orf78 rendered in Chimera.

=== Subcellular localization ===
C16orf78 is predicted to be localized to the cell nucleus. There is also a predicted bipartite nuclear localization signal.

== Expression ==
C16orf78 has restricted expression toward the testis, with much lower expression in other tissues.

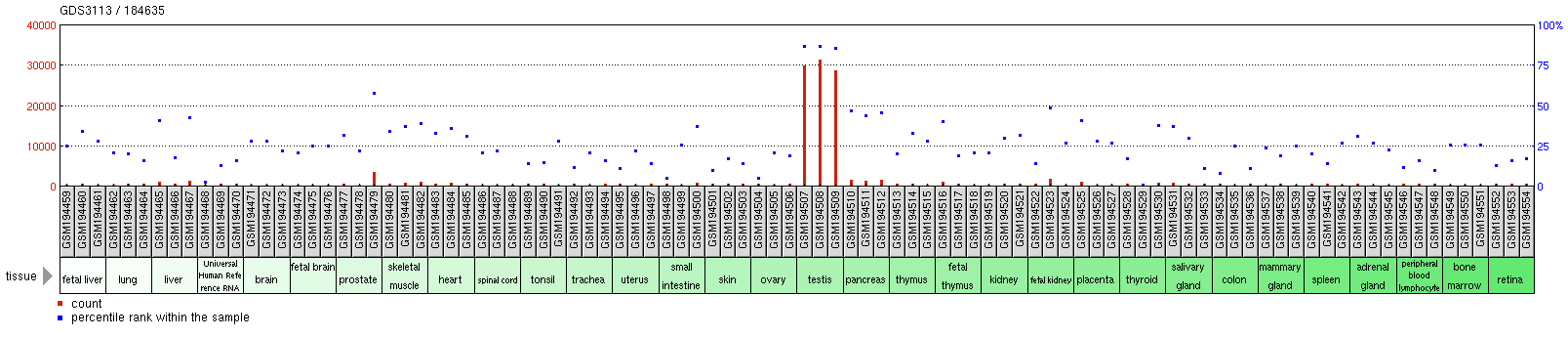
Expression of C16orf78 across multiple human tissues

== Interaction ==
C16orf78 has a physical association with DNA/RNA-binding protein KIN17 (NP_036443.1), suggesting C16orf78 may also play a role in DNA repair. C16orf78 was found to be phosphorylated by SRPK1(NP_003128.3) and SPRK2 (AAH68547.1).

== Clinical significance ==
Deletion of the C16orf78 gene has been identified as a determinant of prostate cancer. A SNP in C16orf78 interacts with a SNP in LMTK2 and is associated with risk of prostate cancer.

Amplification of the C16orf78 gene has been linked to metabolically adaptive cancer cells. A duplication of the C16orf78 gene was associated with at least one case of Rolandic Epilepsy.

== Homology ==
=== Paralogs ===
C16orf78 has no known paralogs in humans.

=== Orthologs ===
C16orf78 has over 80 orthologs, including animals as distant Ciona intestinalis(XP_002132057.1), which is estimated to have diverged from humans 676 million years ago. C16orf78 has orthologs in many types of mammals, reptiles, bony fish, and even some invertebrates, but has no known orthologs in amphibians or birds. Below is a table with samples of orthologs, with divergence dates from TimeTree and similarity calculated by pairwise sequence alignment.

Table of C16orf78 Orthologs
Species Name	NCBI Accession	Divergence (mya) (estimated)	Length (aa)	% Identity	% Similarity
Homo sapiens	NP_653203.1	0	265	100%	100%
Gorilla gorilla gorilla	XP_004057673.2	9.06	265	96%	98%
Macaca mulatta	XP_001082258.1	29.44	267	89%	93%
Galeopterus variegatus	XP_008591134.1	76	266	65%	77%
Oryctolagus cuniculus	XP_008273281.1	90	255	62%	76%
Mus musculus	NP_808569.1	90	270	57%	69%
Lipotes vexillifer	XP_007459548.1	96	266	65%	77%
Capra hircus	XP_017918754.1	96	276	63%	74%
Callorhinus ursinus	XP_025708226.1	96	250	62%	74%
Pteropus vampyrus	XP_011358492.1	96	263	60%	74%
Loxodonta africana	XP_023411324.1	105	285	48%	55%
Sarcophilus harrisii	XP_003757266.1	159	270	38%	53%
Vombatus ursinus	XP_027723426.1	159	275	38%	54%
Pogona vitticeps	XP_020643996.1	312	315	26%	43%
Gekko japonicus	XP_015263322.1	312	261	25%	47%
Python bivittatus	XP_025030465.1	312	313	23%	37%
Latimeria chalumnae	XP_014344069.1	413	310	19%	42%
Acipenser ruthenus	RXM34621.1	435	202	15%	37%
Ciona intestinalis	XP_002132057.1	676	396	10%	32%
Apostichopus japonicus	PIK46940.1	684	292	9%	33%
