= All Species Foundation =

Attempt to catalog all life on Earth

The All Species Foundation (stylized as ALL Species Foundation) was an organization aiming to catalog all species on Earth by 2025 through their All Species Inventory initiative. The project was launched in 2000 by Kevin Kelly, Stewart Brand and Ryan Phelan. Along with other similar efforts, the All Species Foundation was promoted as an important step forward in expanding, modernizing and digitizing the field of taxonomy. The Foundation started with a large grant from the Schlinger Foundation but had difficulty finding continued funding. In 2007 the project ceased activity and "[handed] off [its] mission to the Encyclopedia of Life".

The All Species Foundation received some critique for its approach to defining and identifying species. An open letter expressed concern over the species problem, a fundamental issue in taxonomy of what exactly defines a species. The letter argued that failing to acknowledge and account for this fundamental issue could undermine the use of the database for conservation and biodiversity preservation.

== See also ==
- Catalogue of Life
- Encyclopedia of Life
- Earth BioGenome Project
- Open Tree of Life
- Tree of Life Web Project
- Wikispecies
