= C11orf86 =

Protein-coding gene in the species Homo sapiens

Identifiers
- Aliases: C11orf86, chromosome 11 open reading frame 86
- External IDs: MGI: 1917111; HomoloGene: 52832; GeneCards: C11orf86; OMA:C11orf86 - orthologs

Gene location (Human)
Chr.	Chromosome 11 (human)
Band	11q13.2	Start	66,975,277 bp
Band	11q13.2	End	66,977,009 bp

Gene location (Mouse)
Chr.	Chromosome 19 (mouse)
Band	19|19 A	Start	4,546,816 bp
Band	19|19 A	End	4,548,611 bp
RNA expression pattern
Bgee	Human / Mouse (ortholog); Top expressed in: mucosa of ileum; mucosa of transverse colon; duodenum; jejunal mucosa; rectum; mucosa of sigmoid colon; left adrenal cortex; right adrenal cortex; thymus; muscle tissue / Top expressed in: duodenum; intestinal villus; jejunum; ileum; epithelium of small intestine; morula; colon; left colon; yolk sac; brown adipose tissue; More reference expression data
BioGPS	n/a
Orthologs
Species	Human	Mouse
Entrez	254439	69861
Ensembl	ENSG00000173237	ENSMUSG00000042041
UniProt	A6NJI1	Q8VC23
RefSeq (mRNA)	NM_001136485; NM_001353554	NM_027237
RefSeq (protein)	NP_001129957; NP_001340483	NP_081513
Location (UCSC)	Chr 11: 66.98 – 66.98 Mb	Chr 19: 4.55 – 4.55 Mb
PubMed search
- Wikidata
View/Edit Human	View/Edit Mouse

Chromosome 11 open reading frame 86, also known as C11orf86, is a protein-coding gene in humans. It encodes for a protein known as uncharacterized protein C11orf86, which is predicted to be a nuclear protein. The function of this protein is currently unknown.

== Gene ==
=== Location ===
C11orf86 is located on the long arm of chromosome 11 at 11q13.2. It consists of 1732 base pairs, and is found on the plus strand. Gene neighbors of C11orf86 include uncharacterized LOC105369355, microRNA 6860, microRNA 3163, synaptotagmin 12, ras homolog family member D, and pyruvate carboxylase.

NCBI Gene diagram showing the genes that neighbor C11orf86.

=== Promoter ===
The program ElDorado, by Genomatix, identified the promoter region of C11orf86 on the positive strand from 66974707 to 66975464, for a total length of 758 base pairs.

=== Expression ===
C11orf86 appears to be primarily expressed in the gastrointestinal tract. Expression occurs in ascites, the intestine, the stomach, gastrointestinal tumors, and non-neoplasia.

== mRNA ==
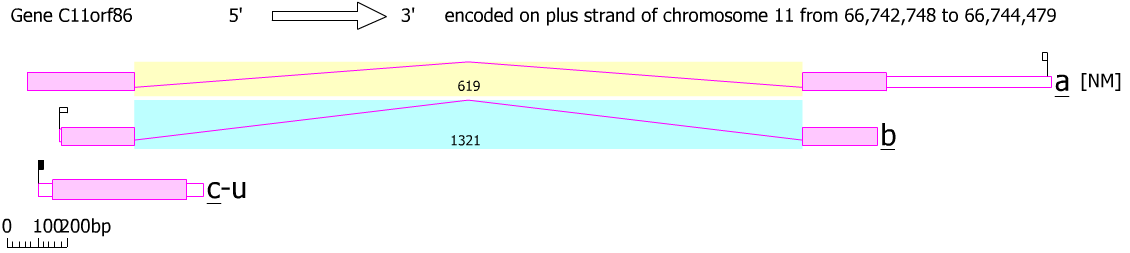
AceView gene diagram of the alternative mRNA splice variants of human C11orf86.

=== Alternative Splicing ===
According to AceView, transcription of the gene produces three different mRNAs, two of which are alternatively spliced variants, while the third is an unspliced form. All three variants could possibly code for functional proteins. The transcript used for this article is made up of two exons, amounting to 1185 base pairs, and has the reference number NM_001136485.1.

mRNA variant	Exon	Exon Size (bp)	Intron	Intron Size (bp)
a	1	362	1	541
a	2	829	1	541
b	1	249	1	538
b	2	251	1	538
c	1	551	0	

== Protein ==
=== General Properties ===
C11orf86 protein is 115 amino acids in length. The molecular weight of C11orf86 is 13.2 kdal. Its isoelectric point is predicted to be 11.9.

1   MGTGLRSQSL REPRPSYGKL QEPWGRPQEG QLRRALSLRQ GQEKSRSQGL ERGTEGPDAT 
61  AQERVPGSLG DTEQLIQAQR RGSRWWLRRY QQVRRRWESF VAIFPSVTLS QPASP

=== Composition ===
The majority of the C11orf86 protein is composed of arginine (15.7%), glutamine (12.2%), serine (10.4%), glycine (10.4%), and leucine (9.6%). No cysteine, histidine, or asparagine residues are found in this protein.

A  :  6( 5.2%); C  :  0( 0.0%); D  :  2( 1.7%); E  :  9( 7.8%); F  :  2( 1.7%)
G  : 12(10.4%); H  :  0( 0.0%); I  :  2( 1.7%); K  :  2( 1.7%); L  : 11( 9.6%)
M  :  1( 0.9%); N  :  0( 0.0%); P  :  9( 7.8%); Q  : 14(12.2%); R  : 18(15.7%)
S  : 12(10.4%); T  :  5( 4.3%); V  :  4( 3.5%); W  :  4( 3.5%); Y  :  2( 1.7%)

C11orf86 has no positive, negative, or mixed charge clusters. However, there is a higher presence of arginine, which is positively charged.

1   00000+0000 +-0+0000+0 0-000+00-0 00++0000+0 00-+0+0000 -+00-00-00 
61  00-+000000 -0-000000+ +00+000++0 000+++0-00 0000000000 00000

=== Domain ===
This protein is a part of the DUF4633 superfamily. Proteins that belong to this family are often between 94 and 123 amino acids in length. This domain is found in bacteria, viruses, fungi, plants, insects, reptiles, birds, and mammals.

Domain of unknown function, DUF4633, and the C11orf86 gene.

=== Post-Translational Modification ===
C11orf86 is predicted to have nine possible phosphorylation sites, of which eight are serine, and one is threonine. It is also predicted to have ten O-linked glycosylation sites.

=== Secondary Structure ===
C11orf86 is primarily composed of random coil and alpha helices.

=== Sub-cellular Localization ===
This protein is predicted to be a nuclear protein. There appears to be a bipartite nuclear localization sequence beginning at position 80.

=== Homology ===
The C11orf86 protein is conserved in mammals, and orthologs can easily be traced back to marsupials, monotremes, and reptiles. No orthologs of C11orf86 appear to be present in plants, fungi, fish, amphibians, or birds. There are no paralogs of C11orf86. The table below shows some orthologs that were found using BLAST. Dates of divergence were found from TimeTree, using the median molecular time estimate.

Genus and species	Common name	Accession number	Protein Length (aa)	Percent identity (%)	Date of Divergence (mya)
Homo sapiens	Human	NP_001129957.1	115	100	
Macaca mulatta	Rhesus macaque	XP_001115236.1	115	89	27.3
Rattus norvegicus	Brown rat	NP_001102991.1	123	74	90.1
Bos taurus	Cattle	NP_001070558.1	122	74	95.0
Equus caballus	Horse	XP_014585069.1	113	71	95.0
Mus musculus	Mouse	NP_081513.1	124	71	90.1
Felis catus	Cat	XP_003993784.1	121	70	95.0
Canis lupus familiaris	Dog	XP_003639729.1	121	69	95.0
Sarcophilus harrisii	Tasmanian devil	XP_012408455.1	120	40	162.4
Ornithorhynchus anatinus	Platypus	XP_007659213.1	119	40	169.7
Chrysemys picta bellii	Painted turtle	XP_008177865.1	135	35	320.5

== Clinical Significance ==
A bipolar disorder association study identified C11orf86 as one of many genes found in a region of linkage disequilibrium on chromosome 11. Despite evidence of some association, C11orf86 was not found to be in an area of particular significance. C11orf86 is down-regulated from non-neoplastic mucosa to adenomas and carcinomas, down-regulated in renal cell carcinoma, and harbors chromosomal gains that are significantly associated with pure mucinous subtypes in mucinous carcinoma.
