= David Attenborough's Rise of Animals: Triumph of the Vertebrates =

2013 British documentary film

- Genre: Documentary
- Narrated by: David Attenborough
- Country of origin: United Kingdom
- Original language: English
- No. of episodes: 2

Production
- Running time: 60 minutes

Original release
- Release: 20 September – 27 September 2013

Triumph of the Vertebrates is a 2013 British documentary film by David Attenborough. It is about the evolution of vertebrates. The first part is From the Seas to the Skies, while the second is Dawn of the Mammals. The film uses a circular timetree of life generated by scientists S. Blair Hedges and Sudhir Kumar, from their TimeTree database, as a temporal framework for the production. The timetree was created using animated computer-generated imagery in scenes every 10 minutes during the 2-hour movie. The circular timetree was published by Hedges and Kumar in 2009 and Hedges was consulted during the production of the film.

== Summary ==
=== Part 1: From the Seas to the Skies ===
David Attenborough embarks on an epic 500-million-year journey to unravel the incredible rise of vertebrates. The evolution of animals with backbones is one of the greatest stories in natural history. To tell this story, David presents explosive new fossil evidence from China, a region he has long dreamt of exploring and the frontier of modern paleontological research.

This episode goes through how the vertebrates evolved and came onto land. It details the origins of the vertebrates, which lie in the primitive fish that once swam in ancient seas. Remarkable advances allowed them to make the radical move onto land, and then take to the skies with the advent of flight. Brand new discoveries of fossils - ancient and living - combined with realistic CGI modelling for bodies and skeletons enable David to chart their unexpected journey out of the water to populate all corners of the globe.

Animals
Myllokunmingia
unidentified Radiodontid
Lampreys
Skates
Parayunnanolepis
Coelacanth
Tiktaalik
Chinese giant salamander
Dinosaurs
Sinosauropteryx
Anchiornis

=== Part 2: Dawn of the Mammals ===
David Attenborough embarks on an epic 500-million-year journey to unravel the incredible rise of the vertebrates. The evolution of animals with backbones is one of the greatest stories in natural history. To tell this story, David presents explosive new fossil evidence from China, a region he has long dreamt of exploring and the frontier of modern paleontological research. He reveals how vertebrates came to be the dominant form of animal life, and why humans are the heirs to a magnificent evolutionary heritage.

This episode reveals how mammals developed from tiny nocturnal forest dwellers to the dominant form of life on the planet following the death of the dinosaurs. David explains how the meteoric rise of mammals led to an astounding diversity of life and laid the foundations for the ascent of man.
