= Coral of life =

Model for presenting evolutionary relationships

The coral of life is a metaphor or a mathematical model useful to illustrate evolution of life or phylogeny at various levels of resolution, including individual organisms, populations, species and large taxonomic groups. Its use in biology resolves several practical and conceptual difficulties that are associated with the tree of life.

== History of the concept ==
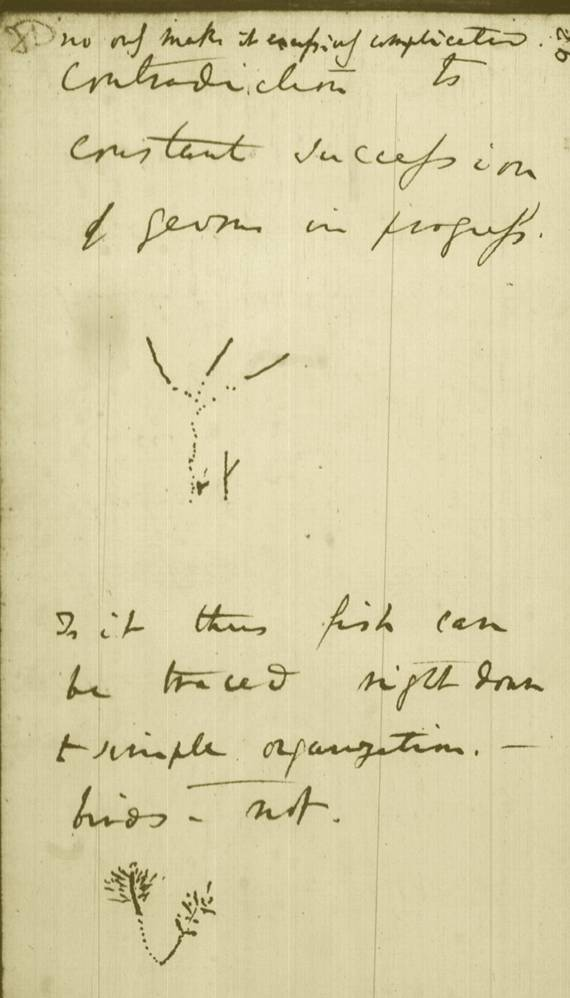
Darwin's coral diagrams from his Notebook B

In a biological context, the 'coral of life' as a metaphor is almost as old as the 'tree of life'. After returning from his voyage around the world, Darwin suggested in his notebooks that:

The tree of life should perhaps be called the coral of life, base of branches dead; so that passages cannot be seen

— Charles Darwin

with obvious reference to branching corals whose dead colonies may form very thick deposits in the ocean (representing past life) with live animals occurring only on the top (recent life). This comment was illustrated by two simple diagrams, the first coral metaphors of evolution ever drawn in the history of biology. However, Darwin later abandoned his idea, and in the Origin of Species he referred to the tree of life as the most appropriate means to summarize affinities of living organisms, thanks most likely to obvious connotations of this metaphor with religion, ancient and folk art and mythology.

Darwin’s early musing was rediscovered by several authors more than a century later, graphical schemes as simple heuristics were drawn again early this century, and corals were raised to the level of mathematically defined objects even more recently.

== Structure ==
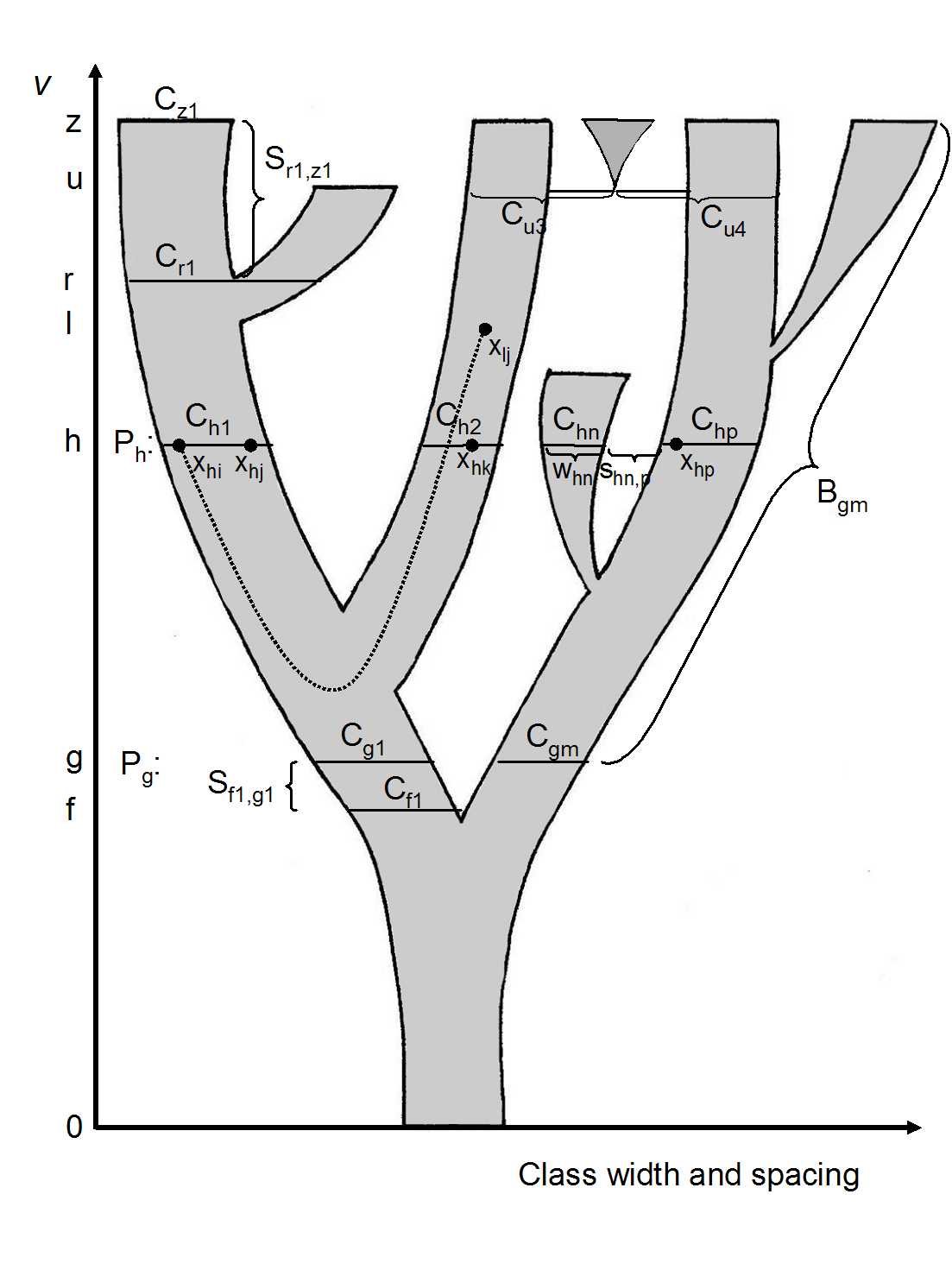

The picture to the right explains the different parts of a coral. Vertical axis is time, horizontal axis may be richness, morphological diversity, some other population measure or even scaled arbitrarily. Each point x in the diagram corresponds to an individual, a population or a taxon. At point of time h, there is an equivalence partition of points into classes C. A class Cg1 is the ancestor of the entire branch above it, Cr1 is the closest common ancestor class of two segments. A segment S is defined by two classes such that there is no branching between them. On top in the middle is visualized a horizontal event, such as hybridization between members of different classes, leading to a new segment and thus to a fan coral.

== Advantages of corals as metaphors of phylogeny ==
Botanical trees and (many) corals share only one fundamental property, namely branching, which makes both of them suitable to illustrate evolutionary divergence. Regarding other features, corals are superior to trees as metaphors of phylogeny because:

- Only the uppermost sections of a coral are alive, whereas all parts of a tree, from its thinnest roots to the uppermost leaves, are living;
- The coral starts its development from a small initial colony, grows upwards and ramifies later, while a tree grows from seed into two opposite directions, producing roots and the crown which may be equally large and similarly complex in shape;
- The diameter of a tree continuously decreases from the trunk to the twigs, a property without phylogenetic implications, while corals may be even wider above than below, better symbolizing temporal change of taxonomic richness or population size;
- Normally, tree branches never fuse whereas coral branches may exhibit anastomoses, thereby representing horizontal evolutionary events.

== Advantages of corals as mathematical models of phylogeny ==
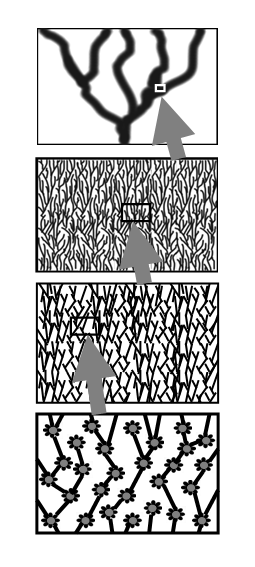
Zooming out from a network/tree of individuals to a coral diagram in 4 steps. See further examples in and

Trees as graph theoretical constructs are composed of vertices (nodes) representing biological entities and connecting edges (links) corresponding to relations between entities. Being a special case of branching silhouette diagrams, corals may also be defined mathematically; these are geometric shapes embedded into a two- or three-dimensional space with time as one axis and some other meaningful property, such as taxon richness, as the other (one or two). Regarding their applicability to represent phylogenies, corals and trees compare in the following way:

- Trees are tools of discrete mathematics, and are therefore inappropriate to demonstrate evolutionary continuum, whereas corals as geometric shapes may very well serve this purpose;
- Trees, by definition, cannot have cycles and – contrary to networks – are thus inappropriate to reflect horizontal events, such as hybridization or endosymbiosis, while fan corals allow links between branches;
- Trees are computationally feasible, and remain fundamental tools in revealing phylogenetic relationships; corals can be constructed by hand based on trees and additional information from various sources in systematics, paleontology, geology etc.
- There is considerable freedom in the graphical visualization of both trees and corals, although the latter may involve more artistic and heuristic elements.

When nodes of trees and networks represent individuals, so that the graphs demonstrate parent-offspring relations for asexual and sexual populations, respectively, one may zoom out so that the minor details (nodes and edges) of the diagram disappear and the discrete graph is smoothed into a coral – which is often called a “tree”, unfortunately.

== Visualizing the entirety of life on earth ==
The 'coral of life'. Dotted or dashed horizontal lines show events such as cell fusion. The red explosion marks on the right mark major mass extinctions.

While corals may be drawn for any particular taxonomic group, e.g., “coral of plants,” the term “coral of life” specifically refers to all cellular life, viruses excluded.

The figure on the right is a first attempt to display a coral of life.

== The coral and the classification of life ==
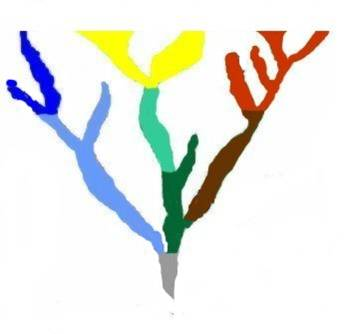
Definition of taxa based on a coral. The red branch is monophyletic, just like the brown and red branches together. The dark and pale green segments exemplify a budding event which may only be possible at the species level.

The last, but not the least important, feature of the coral of life is that it requires a classification valid for the past and present life viewed together. To see how it is possible, we may refer again to Darwin, who warned that the system of Linnaean ranks works only thanks to our insufficient knowledge of the past life. It is due to the absence of extinct forms

and to the consequent wide gaps in the series, that we are enabled to divide the existing species into definable groups, such as genera, families, and tribes

— Charles Darwin

Earlier, in the Origin of Species, he commented that groups that are clearly separable at present, based on many characters, have much fewer differences for their ancient members, which are therefore closer to each other in the past than are their descendants in the present. That is, gaps observed between recent taxa paradoxically disappear when we go back to the ancestors – questioning the meaningfulness of Linnaean ranks . Consistently with this, Darwin suggested further that the natural classification system

must be, as far as possible, genealogical in arrangement, – that is, the co-descendants of the same form must be kept together in one group, apart from the co-descendants of any other form; but if the parent-forms are related, so will be their descendants, and the two groups together will form a larger group…

— Charles Darwin

The system can be made genealogical if we abandon the rank system and consider coral branches as taxa, analogously to clades derived from tree representations of phylogeny. That is, every branch of the coral is a monophyletic group whose members are derived from the same equivalence class such that no other branches arise from that class.
