= Augustin Augier =

François Augustin Marie Augier de Favas (15 December 1758 – 29 January 1825), also known as Augustin Augier, was a French schoolteacher, a Catholic priest, and a botanist.

== Life and career ==
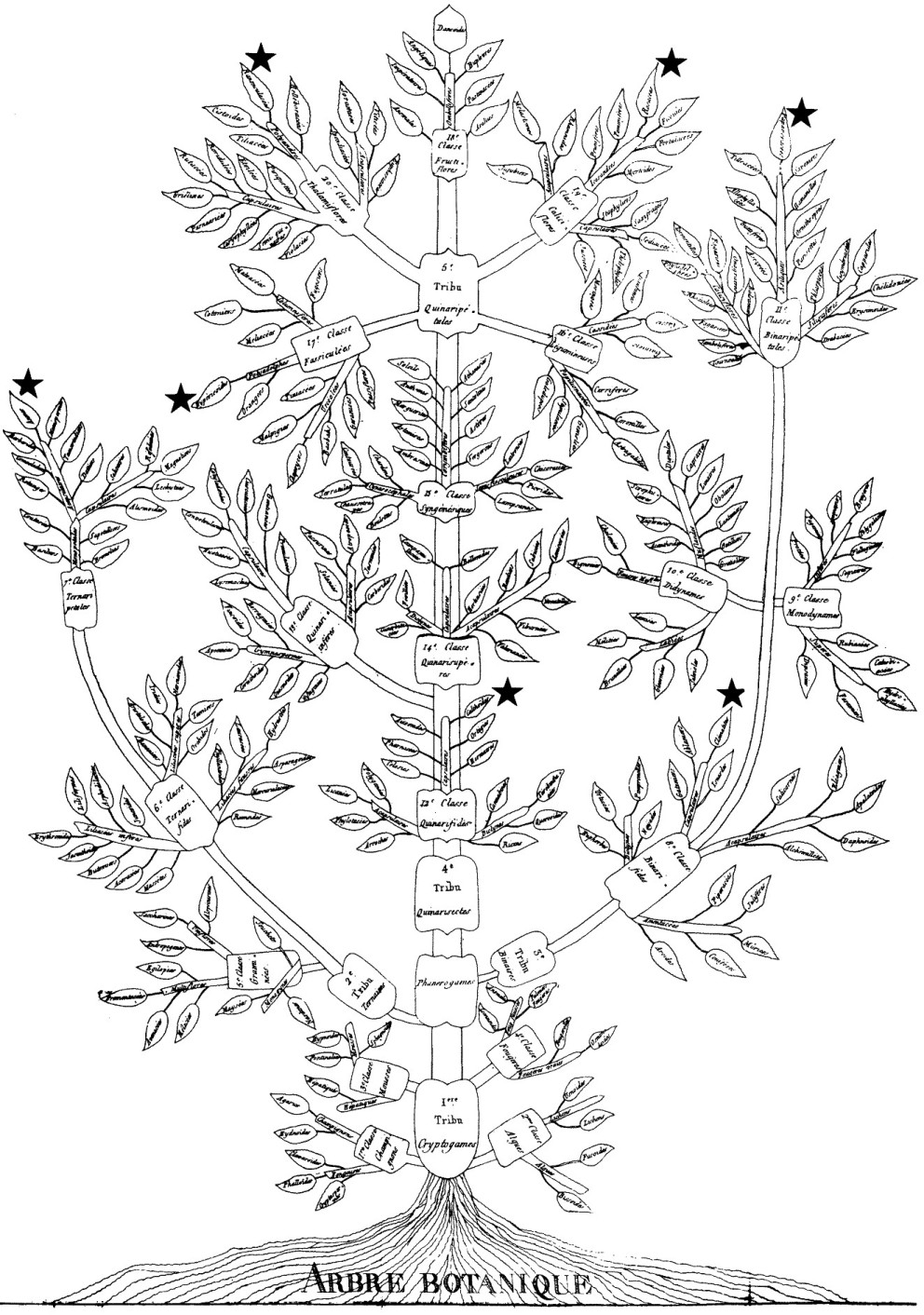
Augier's Arbre botanique ("Botanical Tree"), a pioneering tree of life

Augustin Augier was born on 15 December 1758 in Saint-Tropez, Var. A member of the French Oratorian order, he was trained in Paris and ordained a priest on 22 May 1789, on the eve of the Revolution. For the first part of his career, Augier taught at various Oratorian institutions in France, including at the renown Collège de Tournon, in the Rhône valley. For the latter part, he set up and ran his own boarding schools in Saint-Donat-sur-l'Herbasse and Peyrins.

On the side of his day-time work as a teacher, Augier was also an author. His most famous publication is undoubtedly the Essai d'une nouvelle classification des végétaux, published in Lyons in 1801. Dedicated to botanical taxonomy, the study includes a systematic diagram known as the "Arbre botanique" ("Botanical Tree"); it is generally cited in the literature as the earliest known family tree diagram of natural order, or even as the first evolutionary tree.

Although Augier's tree diagram has been known to the scholarly community since 1983, his identity was only revealed in 2017.

Augier died in the village of Peyrins, Drôme, on 29 January 1825.

== Publications ==
- Essai d'une nouvelle classification des végétaux. Lyon, Bruyset, 1801
- Mémoire sur l'instruction publique, principalement sur l'enseignement de la langue latine. Valence, 1812.
