= Wikispecies =

Wiki-based online project for Linnaean taxonomy

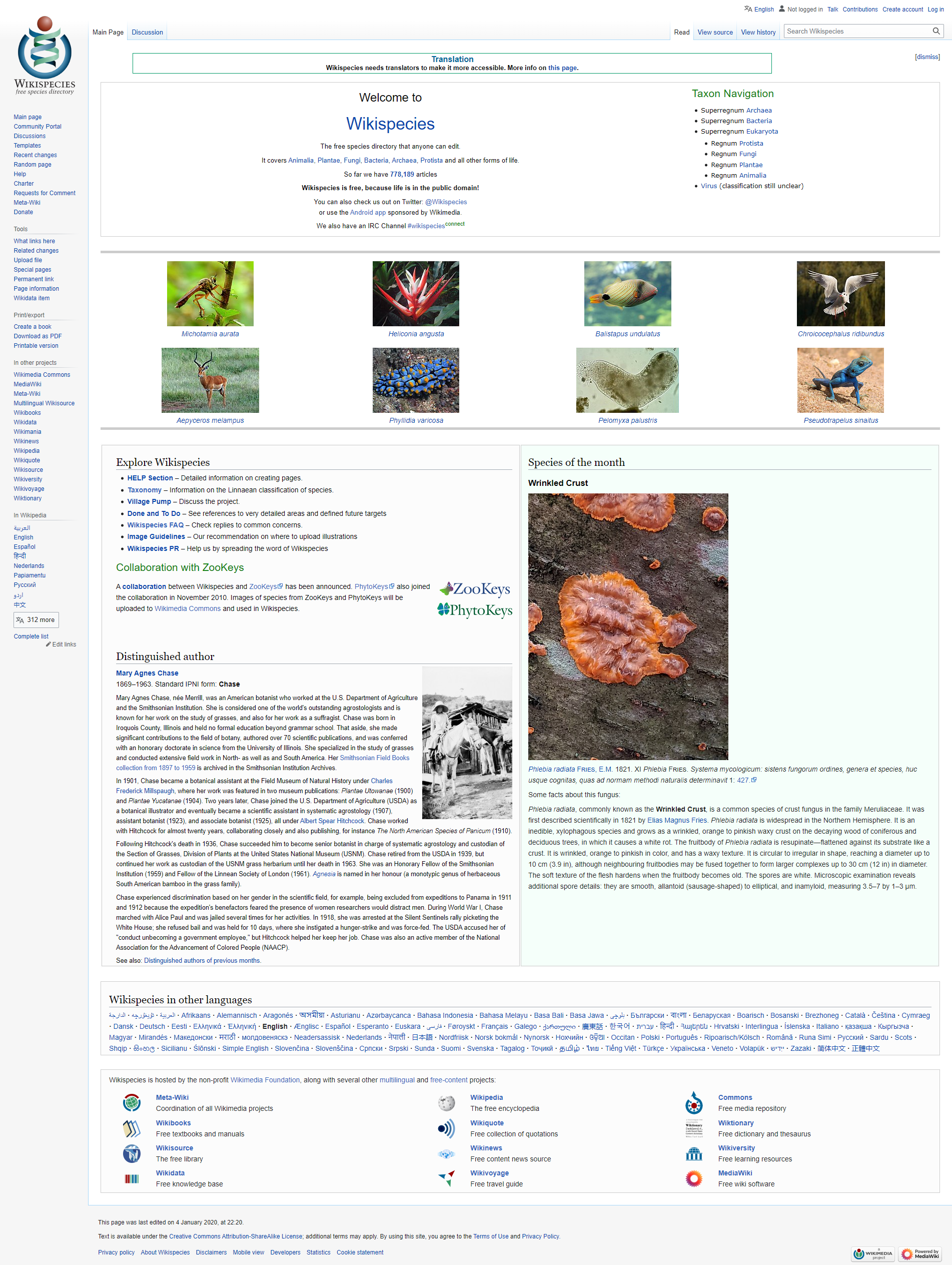
- Screenshot Screenshot of species.wikimedia.org home page on 3 May 2011
- Website type: Species directory
- Owner: Wikimedia Foundation
- Creators: Benedikt Mandl (proposed project in 2004); Jimmy Wales and the Wikimedia community
- Website: species.wikimedia.org
- Commercial: No
- Registration: Optional
- Launched: 2004

Wikispecies is a wiki-based online project supported by the Wikimedia Foundation. Its aim is to create a comprehensive open content catalog of all species; the project is directed at scientists, rather than at the general public. Jimmy Wales stated that editors are not required to fax in their degrees, but that submissions will have to pass muster with a technical audience. Wikispecies is available under the GNU Free Documentation License and CC BY-SA 4.0.

Started in September 2004, with biologists around the world invited to contribute, the project had grown to a framework encompassing the Linnaean taxonomy with links to Wikipedia articles on individual species by April 2005.

== History ==
Benedikt Mandl coordinated the efforts of several people who were interested in getting involved with the project and contacted potential supporters in the early summer of 2004. Databases were evaluated and the administrators contacted; some of them have agreed on providing their data for Wikispecies. Mandl defined two major tasks:

1. Figure out how the contents of the data base would need to be presented—by asking experts, potential non-professional users and comparing that with existing databases
2. Figure out how to do the software, which hardware is required and how to cover the costs—by asking experts, looking for fellow volunteers and potential sponsors

Advantages and disadvantages were widely discussed by the wikimedia-I mailing list. The board of directors of the Wikimedia Foundation voted by 4 to 0 in favor of the establishment of Wikispecies. The project was launched in August 2004 and is hosted at species.wikimedia.org. It was officially merged into a sister project of the Wikimedia Foundation on September 14, 2004.

- On October 10, 2006, the project exceeded 75,000 articles.
- On May 20, 2007, the project exceeded 100,000 articles
- On September 8, 2008, the project exceeded 150,000 articles
- On October 23, 2011, the project reached 300,000 articles.
- On June 16, 2014, the project reached 400,000 articles.
- On January 7, 2017, the project reached 500,000 articles.
- On October 30, 2018, the project reached 600,000 articles, and a total of 1.12 million pages.
- On December 8, 2019, the project reached 700,000 articles, and a total of 1.33 million pages.
- On January 8, 2021, the project reached 750,000 articles, and a total of 1.5 million pages.
- On April 16, 2022, the project reached 800,000 articles, and a total of 1.67 million pages.
- On September 17, 2023, the project reached 850,000 articles, and a total of 1.87 million pages.
- On January 17, 2025, the project reached 900,000 articles, and a total of 2.03 million pages.

As a database for taxonomy and nomenclature, Wikispecies comprises taxon pages, and additionally pages about synonyms, taxon authorities, taxonomical publications, type material, and institutions or repositories holding type specimen.

== Policies ==
Wikispecies has disabled local upload and asks users to use images from Wikimedia Commons. Wikispecies does not allow the use of content that does not conform to a free license.

== See also ==
- All Species Foundation
- Catalogue of Life
- Encyclopedia of Life
- Tree of Life Web Project
- List of online encyclopedias
- The Plant List
