= Taxonomic boundary paradox =

Conflict in biological classification

The term boundary paradox refers to the conflict between traditional, rank-based classification of life and evolutionary thinking. In the hierarchy of ranked categories it is implicitly assumed that the morphological gap is growing along with increasing ranks: two species from the same genus are more similar than other two species from different genera in the same family, these latter two species are more similar than any two species from different families of the same order, and so on. However, this requirement may only satisfy for the classification of contemporary organisms; difficulties arise if we wish to classify descendants together with their ancestors. Theoretically, such a classification necessarily involves segmentation of the spatio-temporal continuum of populations into groups with crisp boundaries. However, the problem is not only that many parent populations would separate at species level from their offspring. The truly paradoxical situation is that some between-species boundaries would necessarily coincide with between-genus boundaries, and a few between-genus boundaries with borders between families, and so on. This apparent ambiguity cannot be resolved in Linnaean systems; resolution is only possible if classification is cladistic (see below).

== Historical background ==
Jean-Baptiste Lamarck, in Philosophie zoologique (1809), was the first who questioned the objectivity of rank-based classification of life, by saying:

…classes, orders, families, genera and nomenclatures are weapons of our own invention. We could not do without them, but we must use them with discretion. …among her productions nature has not really formed either classes, orders, families, genera or constant species, but only individuals who succeed one another and resemble those from which they sprung.

— J. B. Lamarck

Half a century later, Charles Darwin explained that sharp separation of groups of organisms observed at present becomes less obvious if we go back into the past:

The most common case, especially with respect to very distinct groups, such as fish and reptiles, seems to be, that supposing them to be distinguished at the present day from each other by a dozen characters, the ancient members of the same two groups would be distinguished by a somewhat lesser number of characters, so that the two groups, though formerly quite distinct, at that period made some small approach to each other.

— C.R. Darwin

In his book on orchids, Darwin also warned that the system of ranks would not work if we knew more details about past life:

To make a perfect gradation, all the extinct forms which have ever existed, along many lines of descent converging to the common progenitor of the order, would have to be called into life. It is due to their absence, and to the consequent wide gaps in the series, that we are enabled to divide the existing species into definable groups, such as genera, families, and tribes.

— C.R. Darwin

Finally, Richard Dawkins has argued recently that

If we assume, as almost every anthropologist today accepts, that all members of the genus Homo are descended from ancestors belonging to the genus we call Australopithecus, it necessarily follows that, somewhere along the chain of descent from one species to the other, there must have been at least one individual who sat exactly on the borderline.

and

Indeed, on the evolutionary view, the conferring of discrete names should actually become impossible if only the fossil record were more complete. In one way, it is fortunate that fossils are so rare. If we had a continuous and unbroken fossil record, the granting of distinct names to species and genera would become impossible, or at least very problematical.

with the following conclusion:

The [Linnaean] system works, as long as we don’t try to classify the dead antecedents. But as soon as we include our hypothetically complete fossil record, all the neat separations break down.

— R. Dawkins

== Illustrative models ==
The paradox may be best illustrated by model diagrams similar to Darwin’s single evolutionary tree in On the Origin of Species. In these tree graphs, dots represent populations and edges correspond to parent-offspring relations. The trees are placed into a coordinate system which is one-dimensional (time) for a single lineage, and two-dimensional (differentiation vs. time) for cladogenesis or evolution with divergence.

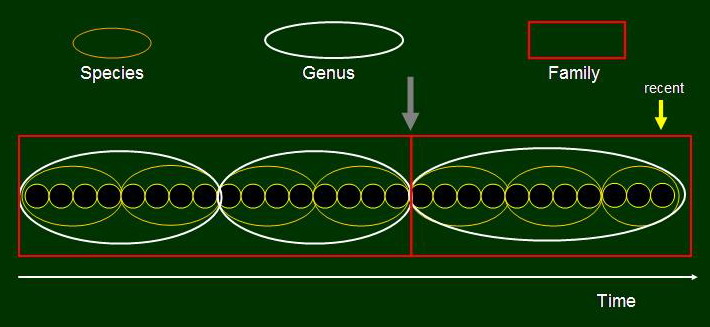
Boundary paradox: chronospecies replace each other in time for a single lineage, with hypothetical genera and families superimposed.

In the single lineage model we now consider a sequence of populations along an extremely long time axis, say several hundred million years, with the last dot representing an extant population. In the figure there is space for a few dots even though edges between adjacent populations are hidden. We could use a second axis to express differentiation, but it is not necessary for our purposes. Here we assume that there is no extinction and all branching events are disregarded (if there were no branches at all, then the changes would correspond to a typical anagenesis. Classification of organisms along this sequence into species is shown by small ellipses. If the differences between certain species are judged to be large enough to justify classification into distinct genera, then generic separators must each coincide with a between-species boundary. If differences reach family-level differentiation, which is easy to imagine over the very long time we consider here, the consequence is that a family-level border must overlap with a between-genus and, in turn, a between-species border (gray arrow in the figure). One cannot imagine, however, that a parent and its offspring are so distinct that they should be classified to different families, or even genera – that would be paradoxical. This illustrates Dawkins’ above argumentation on human ancestry at the level of genera, Homo and Australopithecus.

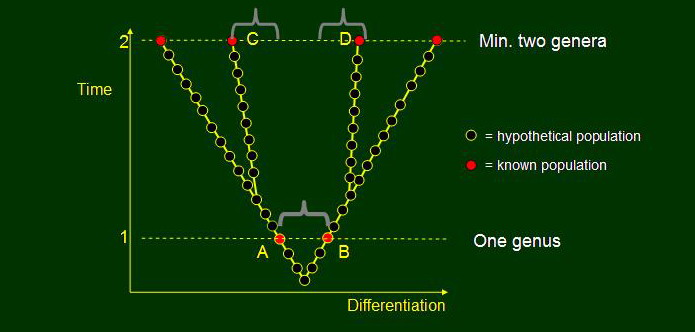
Boundary paradox: evolutionary divergence breaks up Linnaean ranks. Gray curly brackets indicate morphological ranges for each genus.

Darwin placed emphasis on divergence, that is, when a parent population splits and these offspring populations diverge gradually, each following their own anagenetic sequence potentially with further divergence events. In this case, evolutionary (say morphological) divergence is expressed on a new, horizontal, axis and time becomes the vertical axis. At time point 1 an imaginary taxonomist judges populations A and B to belong to different species, but within the same genus. Their respective descendants, C and D are observed at time 2, and considered to represent two separate genera because their morphological difference is large. The paradox is that while A and C, as well as B and D remain within generic limits but C and D do not, so that ancestors cannot be classified together with their descendants meaningfully in a Linnaean system. This figure illustrates the problem Darwin has discussed in the fish and reptile example.

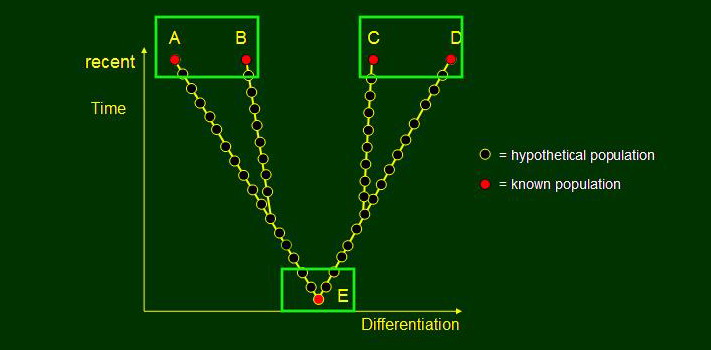
Gaps in fossil record allow separation of known species into separate taxa. Full knowledge of extant organisms would reveal continuity of populations.

Let us consider a hypothetical evolutionary tree with four recent species, A to D, classified into two genera that are fairly distant from each other morphologically. We assume, further, that from the fossil record we only know their common ancestor, E, representing yet another genus for a taxonomist because it takes “intermediate” position between the other two – yet considerably different from both. All other forms went extinct; therefore we have classification of these five species into three genera, which would be illogical if more fossils were known. This illustrates Darwin’s and Dawkins’ examples on the role of gaps in the fossil record in classification – and nomenclature.

== Resolution ==
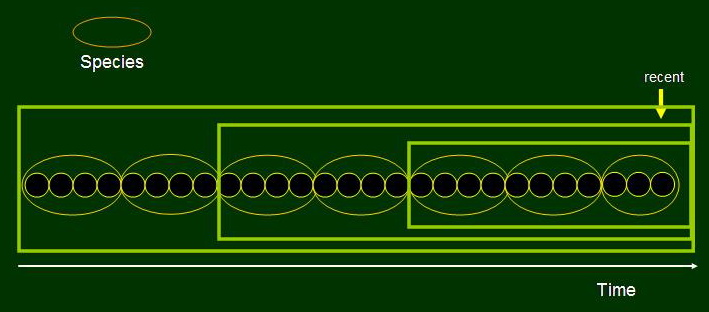
Groups that may be delineated in the single lineage model form a fully nested system.

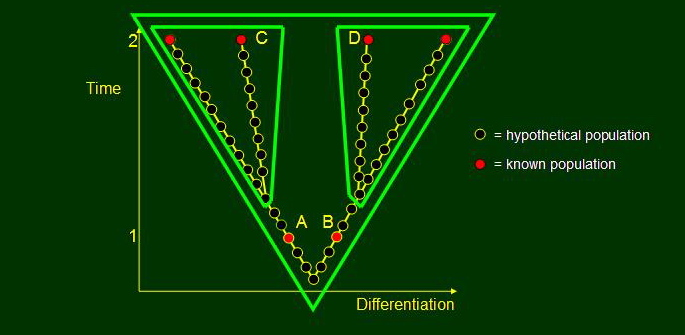
Groups delineated in the divergence model correspond to sister groups within a larger clade, with populations A and B representing stem species on the lineage leading to each.

As demonstrated, given a Darwinian evolutionary model, descendants and their ancestors cannot be classified together within the system of Linnean ranks. Solution is provided by cladistic classification in which each group is composed of an ancestor and all of its descendant populations, a condition called monophyly. In the above models monophyletic groups may be obtained by cutting a branch (subtree) from the tree at places where, for instance, new apomorphic (evolutionary derived) characters appear. For these groups there is no need to consider how much change occurred between members of one group as compared to those of the other.

== See also ==
- Clade
- Sister group
- Temporal paradox (paleontology)
