= Tree of Life Web Project =

Internet project providing information about the diversity and phylogeny of life

Content
- Description: Online collaborative database
- Data types captured: Biological species, Phylogeny

Contact
- Authors: David Maddison; Katja-Sabine Schulz; Wayne Maddison
- Release date: 1995

Access
- Website: www.tolweb.org

The Tree of Life Web Project (ToL) is an Internet project providing information about the diversity and phylogeny of life on Earth.

This collaborative peer reviewed project began in 1995, and is written by biologists from around the world. The site has not been updated since 2011. The servers stopped responding to requests in November 2025, but the site was restored in September, 2026.

The pages are linked hierarchically, in the form of the branching evolutionary tree of life, organized cladistically. Each page contains information about one particular group of organisms and is organized according to a branched tree-like form, thus showing hypothetical relationships between different groups of organisms.

In 2009 the project ran into funding problems from the University of Arizona. Pages and Treehouses submitted took a considerably longer time to be approved as they were being reviewed by a small group of volunteers, and apparently, around 2011, all activities ended.

== History ==
The idea of this project started in the late 1980s. David Maddison was working on a computer program MacClade during his PhD research. This is an application that gives insight into species' phylogenetic trees. He wanted to extend this program with a feature that allowed the user to browse through phylogenetic trees and zoom into other lower or higher taxa.

Hence, this association was not unique in a stand-alone application. The researchers came up with the idea to export the application into the World Wide Web and this was realized in 1995. From 1996 to 2011, over 300 biologists from around the globe added taxa web pages into the phylogeny browser.

== Quality ==
To ensure the quality of ToL project, the board made use of peer-review. The pages that were reviewed were sent to two or three researchers that specialized in the particular subject. It is possible to visit the personal page of the author. If this is not accessible then the institution is always at the footnote. The entire tree structure that contained 35,960 species until the website's demise, is available for download as a csv dataset.

== See also ==
- Catalogue of Life
- Charles Darwin
- Darwin Tree of Life
- Encyclopedia of Life
- Open Tree of Life
- Tree of life (biology)
- Wikispecies
