= Open Tree of Life =

Online phylogenetic tree of life

- Available in: English
- Website: opentreeoflife.org
- Commercial: no
- Registration: not required
- Launched: September 2015
- Current status: active
- Content license: BSD 2-clause (FreeBSD)

The Open Tree of Life is an online phylogenetic tree of life – a collaborative effort, funded by the National Science Foundation. The first draft, including 2.3 million species, was released in September 2015. The Interactive graph allows the user to zoom in to taxonomic classifications, phylogenetic trees, and information about a node. Clicking on a species will return its source and reference taxonomy.

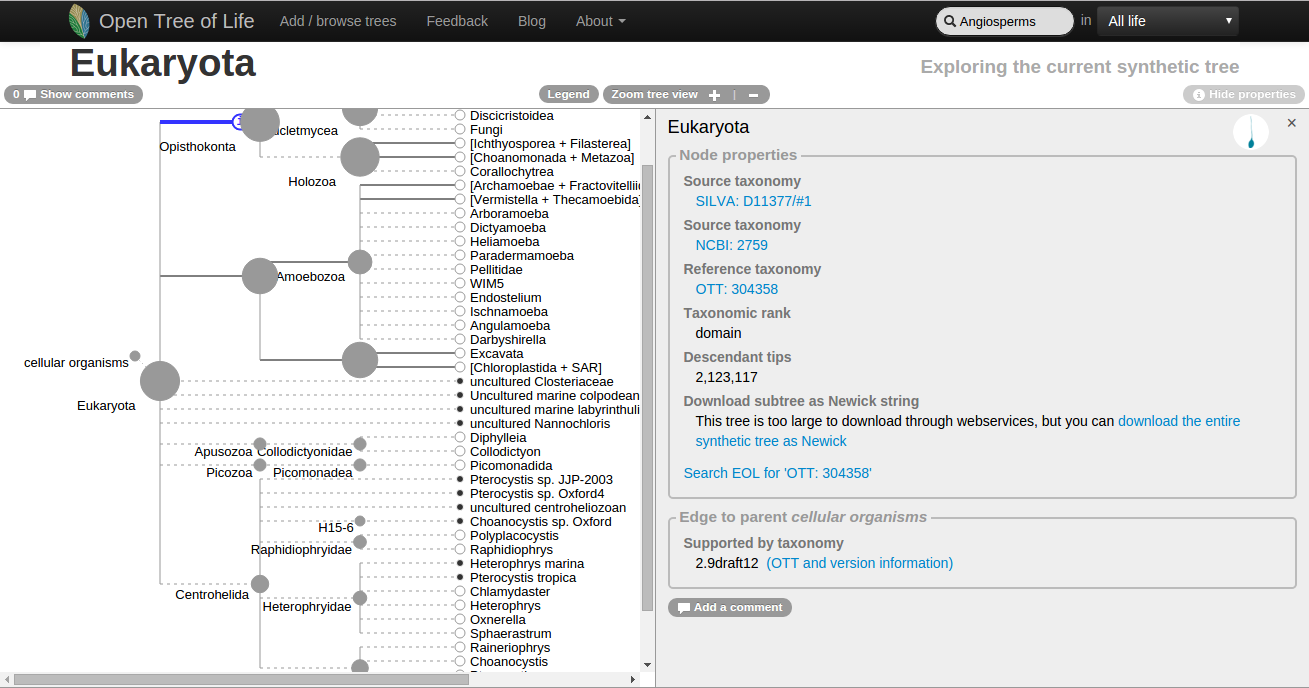
The tree of life at the node Eukaryota

== Approach ==
The project uses a supertree approach to generate a single phylogenetic tree (served at tree.opentreeoflife.org) from a comprehensive taxonomy and a curated set of published phylogenetic estimates.

The taxonomy is a combination of several large classifications produced by other projects; it is created using a software tool called "smasher". The resulting taxonomy is called an Open Tree Taxonomy (OTT) and can be browsed on-line.

== History ==
The project was started in June 2012 with a three-year NSF award to researchers at ten universities. In 2015, a two-year supplemental award was made to researchers at three institutions.

== See also ==
- Tree of Life Web Project
