= DNA/RNA-binding protein KIN17 =

Protein-coding gene in the species Homo sapiens

KIN
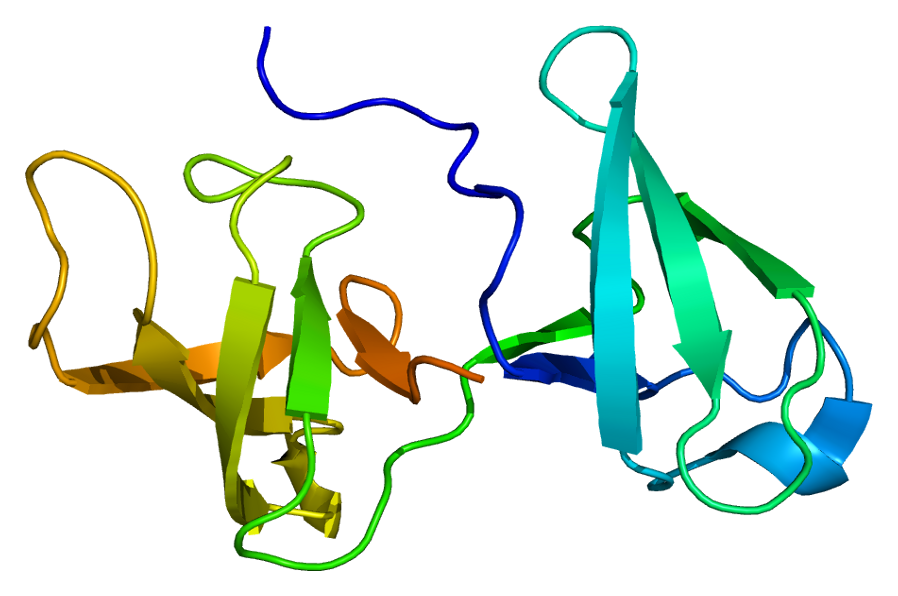

Identifiers
- Aliases: KIN, BTCD, KIN17, Rts2, Kin17 DNA and RNA binding protein
- External IDs: OMIM: 601720; MGI: 96676; GeneCards: KIN
Available structures
PDB	Ortholog search: PDBe RCSB
PDB	List of PDB id codes 2CKK, 2V1N

Gene location (Human)
Chr.	Chromosome 10 (human)
Band	10p14	Start	7,750,962 bp
Band	10p14	End	7,787,993 bp

Gene location (Mouse)
Chr.	Chromosome 2 (mouse)
Band	2|2 A1	Start	10,085,404 bp
Band	2|2 A1	End	10,097,617 bp
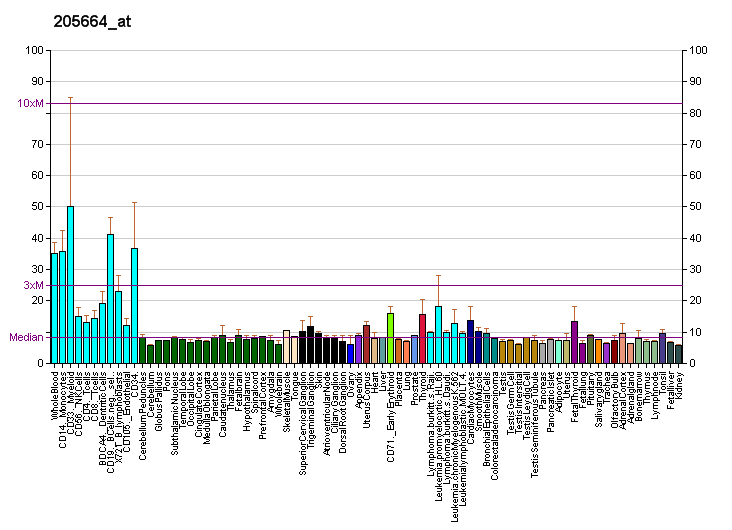
RNA expression pattern
Bgee	Human / Mouse (ortholog); Top expressed in: monocyte; Achilles tendon; gonad; mucosa of transverse colon; ganglionic eminence; buccal mucosa cell; Descending thoracic aorta; epithelium of colon; left lobe of thyroid gland; popliteal artery / Top expressed in: granulocyte; genital tubercle; tail of embryo; ankle joint; yolk sac; ganglionic eminence; thymus; ventricular zone; neural layer of retina; embryo; More reference expression data
BioGPS	More reference expression data
Gene ontology
Molecular function	DNA binding; double-stranded DNA binding; metal ion binding; RNA binding; protein binding
Cellular component	cytoplasm; nuclear matrix; intracellular membrane-bounded organelle; nucleus; nucleoplasm; protein-containing complex
Biological process	DNA replication; mRNA processing; DNA recombination; viral process; DNA repair; cellular response to DNA damage stimulus
Sources:Amigo / QuickGO
Orthologs
Databases	NCBI: entry; OMA: entry
Species	Human	Mouse
Entrez	22944	16588
Ensembl	ENSG00000151657	ENSMUSG00000037262
UniProt	O60870	Q8K339
RefSeq (mRNA)	NM_012311	NM_025280
RefSeq (protein)	NP_036443	NP_079556
Location (UCSC)	Chr 10: 7.75 – 7.79 Mb	Chr 2: 10.09 – 10.1 Mb
PubMed search
- Wikidata
View/Edit Human	View/Edit Mouse

DNA/RNA-binding protein KIN17 is a protein that in humans is encoded by the KIN gene.

The protein encoded by this gene is a nuclear protein that forms intranuclear foci during proliferation and is redistributed in the nucleoplasm during the cell cycle. Short-wave ultraviolet light provokes the relocalization of the protein, suggesting its participation in the cellular response to DNA damage. Originally selected based on protein-binding with RecA antibodies, the mouse protein presents a limited similarity with a functional domain of the bacterial RecA protein, a characteristic shared by this human ortholog.
