= Philosophie zoologique =

1809 book by Jean-Baptiste Lamarck

Philosophie zoologique ou exposition des considérations relatives à l'histoire naturelle des animaux
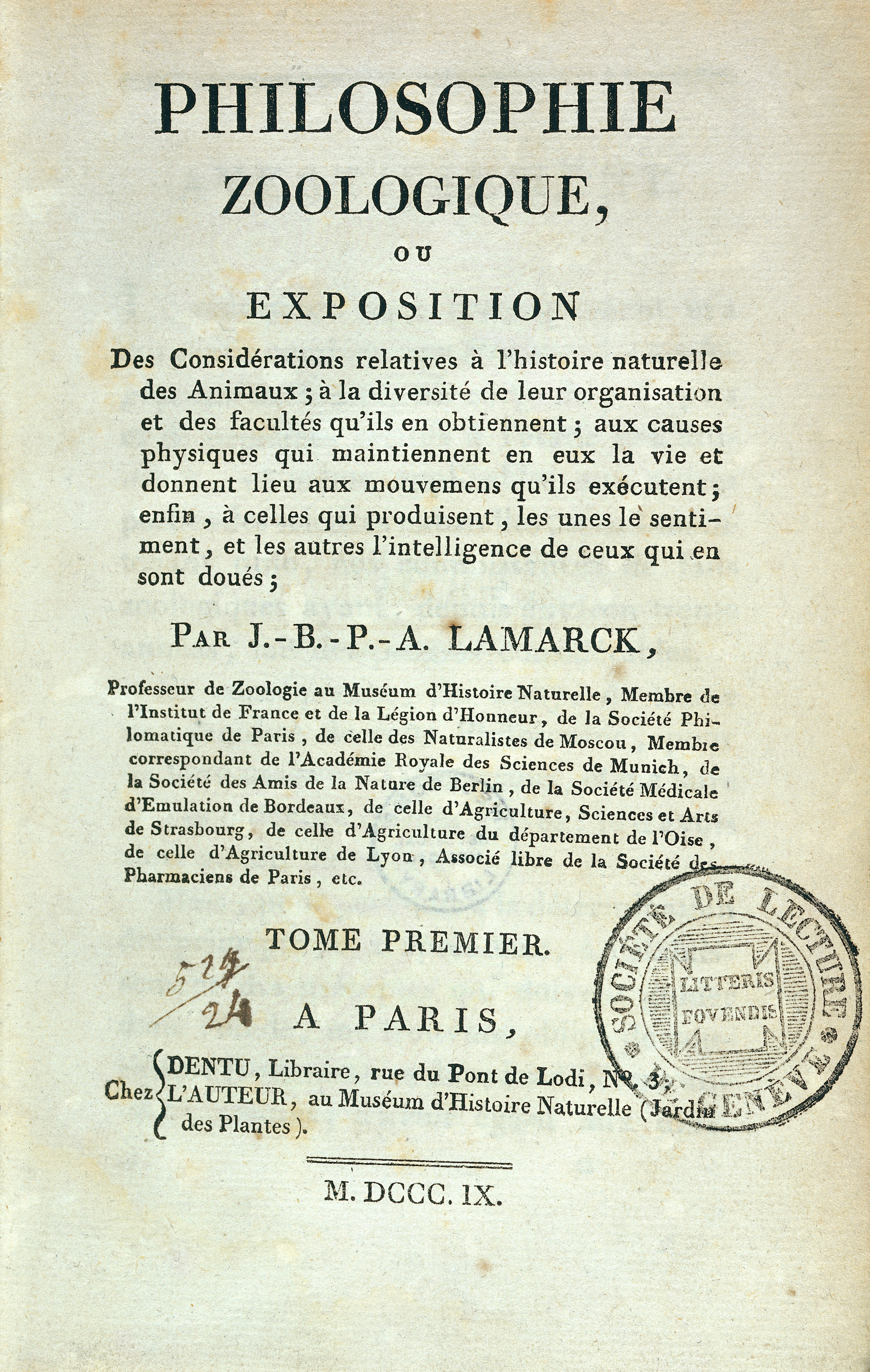
- Title page of first edition, 1809
- Author: Jean-Baptiste Lamarck
- Subject: Zoology, evolution
- Publisher: National Museum of Natural History, France
- Publication date: 1809
- Publication place: France

Philosophie zoologique ("Zoological Philosophy, or Exposition with Regard to the Natural History of Animals") is an 1809 book by the French naturalist Jean-Baptiste Lamarck, in which he outlines his pre-Darwinian theory of evolution, part of which is now known as Lamarckism.

In the book, Lamarck named two supposed laws that would enable animal species to acquire characteristics under the influence of the environment. The first law stated that use or disuse would cause body structures to grow or shrink over the generations. The second law asserted that such changes would be inherited. Those conditions together imply that species continuously change by adaptation to their environments, forming a branching series of evolutionary paths.

Lamarck was largely ignored by the major French zoologist Cuvier, but he attracted much more interest abroad. The book was read carefully, but its thesis rejected, by nineteenth century scientists including the geologist Charles Lyell and the comparative anatomist Thomas Henry Huxley. Charles Darwin acknowledged Lamarck as an important zoologist, and his theory a forerunner of Darwin's evolution by natural selection.

== Context ==
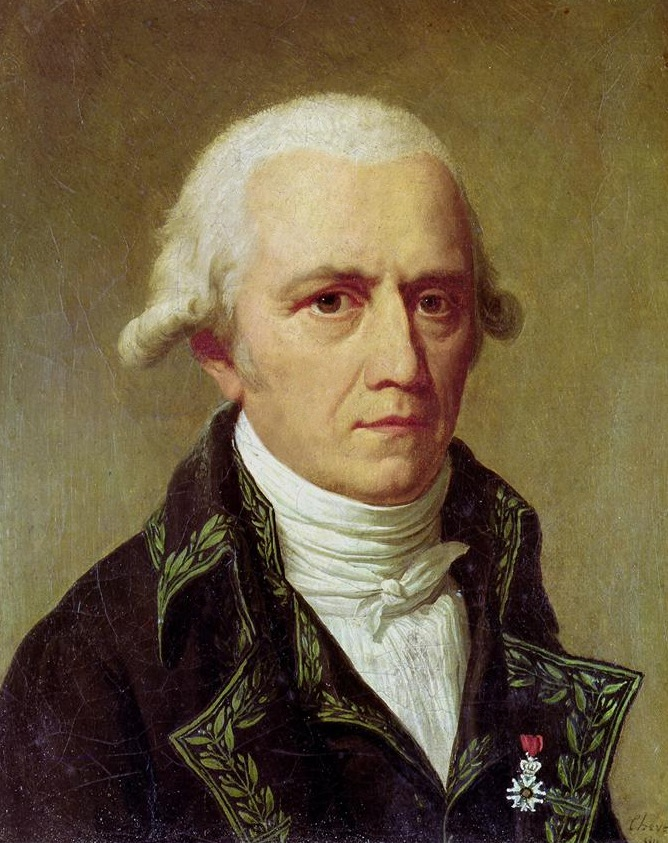
Lamarck by Charles Thévenin (c. 1802)

Jean-Baptiste Lamarck (1744–1829) was a member of the French Academy of Sciences and a professor of botany at the Jardin des Plantes and then became the first professor of zoology at the new Muséum national d'Histoire naturelle. He became known for his work on the taxonomy of the invertebrates, especially of molluscs. However, he is mainly remembered for the theory that now bears his name, Lamarckism, and in particular his view that the environment (called by Lamarck the conditions of life) gave rise to permanent, inherited, evolutionary changes in animals. He described his theory in his 1802 Recherches sur l'organisation des corps vivants, and in his 1809 Philosophie zoologique, and later in his Histoire naturelle des animaux sans vertèbres, (1815–1822).

== Book ==
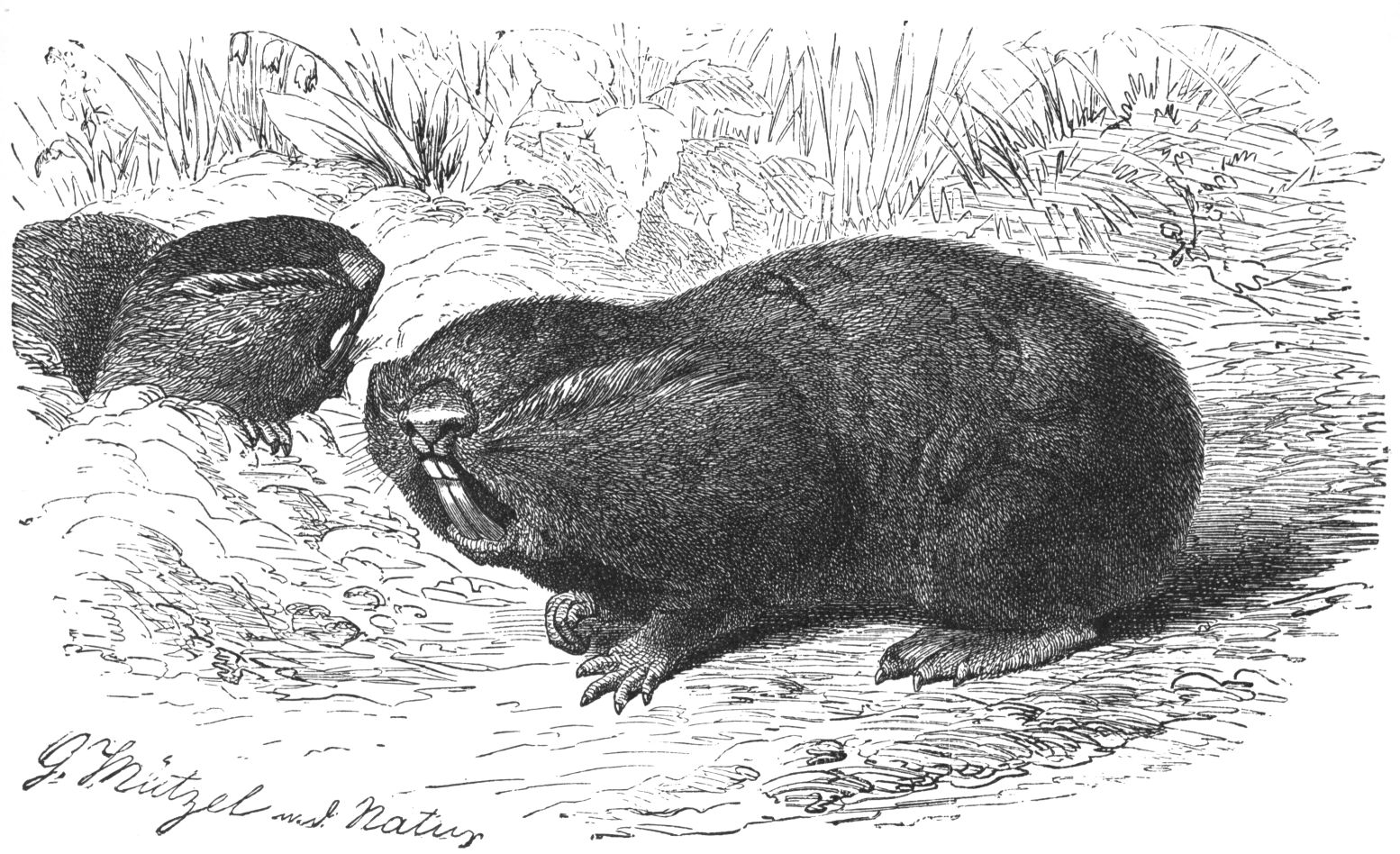
Lamarck used the blind mole rat (Spalax) as an example of the loss of function through disuse. The animal's tiny eyes are completely covered by a layer of skin.

In the Philosophie zoologique, Lamarck proposed that species could acquire new characteristics from influences in their environment, in two rules that he named as laws. His first law stated that use or disuse of a body's structures would cause them to grow or shrink in the course of several generations. His second law held that any changes made in this way would be inherited. Together, Lamarck's laws imply the steady adaptation of animals to their environments.

He gave names to a number of vestigial structures in the book, among them "Olivier's Spalax, which lives underground like the mole, and is apparently exposed to daylight even less than the mole, has altogether lost the use of sight: so that it shows nothing more than vestiges of this organ."

Lamarck described speciation as follows:

as new modifications will necessarily continue to operate, however slowly, not only will there continually be found new species, new genera, and new orders, but each species will vary in some part of its structure and form ... individuals which from special causes are transported into very different situations from those where the others occur, and then constantly submitted to other influences – the former, I say, assume new forms, and then they constitute a new species.

He argued that gaps between differing kinds of animals resulted from the extinction of intermediate forms, in:

a branching series, irregularly graduated which has no discontinuity in its parts, or which, at least, if it's true that there are some because of lost species, has not always had such. It follows that the species that terminate each branch of the general series are related, at least on one side, to the other neighboring species that shade into them.

Lamarck proposed the transmutation of species ("transformisme"), but did not believe that all living things shared a common ancestor. Rather he believed that simple forms of life were created continuously by spontaneous generation. He also believed that an innate life force, which he sometimes described as a nervous fluid, drove species to become more complex over time, advancing up a linear ladder of complexity similar to the mediaeval great chain of being.

== Contents ==
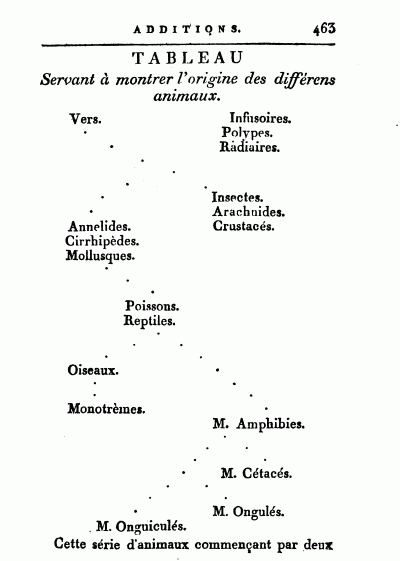
Lamarck's 1809 tree of life depiction of the origins of animal groups in Philosophie zoologique with branching evolutionary paths

The first volume concerns natural history, the second physiology, and the third psychology. Page numbers are given in parentheses.

VOLUME 1

Avertissement (I–XXV)

Discours Préliminaire (1)

Première Partie

(Considérations sur l'Histoire naturelle des Animaux, leurs caractères, leurs rapports, leur organisation, leur distribution, leur classification et leur espèces)

I. Des Parties de l'art dans les productions de la Nature (17)

II. Importance des Rapports (39)

III. De l'Espèce parmi les Corps vivans, et de l'idée que nous devons attacher à ce mot (53)

IV. Généralités sur les Animaux (82)

V. Sur l'Etat actuel de la Distribution et de la Classification des Animaux (102)

VI. Dégradation et simplification de l'organisation d'une extrémité a l'autre de la Chaîne animale (130)

VII. De l'influence des Circonstances sur les actions et les habitudes des Animaux, et de celle des actions et des habitudes de ces Corps vivans, comme causes qui modifient leur organisation et leurs parties (218)

VIII. De l'Ordre naturel des Animaux et de la disposition qu'il faut donner a leur distribution generale pour la rendre conforme a l'ordre meme de la nature (269)

Seconde Partie

(Considerations sur les Causes physiques de la Vie, les conditions qu'elle exige pour exister, la force excitatrice de ses mouvemens, les facultes qu'elle donne aux corps qui la possedent, et les resultats de son existence dans les corps)(359)

Introduction (359)

I. Comparison des Corps inorganiques avec les Corps vivans, suivie d'un Parallele entre les Animaux et les Vegetaux (377)

II. De la Vie, de ce qui la constitue, et des Conditions essentielles a son existence dans un corps (400)

VOLUME 2 [1830 edition]

III. De la cause excitatrice des mouvemens organiques (1)

IV. De l'orgasme et de l'irritabilité (20)

V. Du tissu cellulaire, considere comme la gangue dans laquelle toute organisation a ete formee (46)

VI. Des generations directes ou spontanees (61)

VII. Des resultats immediats de la vie dans un corps (91)

VIII. Des facultes communes a tous les corps vivans (113)

IX. Des facultes particulieres a certains corps vivans (127)

Troisieme Partie

Introduction (169)

I. Du système nerveux (180)

II. Du fluide nerveux (235)

III. De la sensibilité physique et du mécanisme des sensations (252)

IV. Du sentiment intérieur, des émotions qu'il est susceptible d'éprouver, et de la puissance (276)

V. De la force productrice des actions des animaux (302)

VI. De la volonté (330)

VII. De l'entendement, de son origine, et de celle des idees (346)

VIII. Des principaux actes de l'entendement (388)

De l'imagination (411)

De la raison et de sa comparaison avec l'instinct (441)

Additions relatives aux chapitres VII et VIII de la premiere partie (451)

== Reception ==
Lamarck's evolutionary theory made little immediate impact on his fellow zoologists, or on the public at the time. The historian of science Richard Burkhardt argues that this was because Lamarck was convinced his views would be poorly received, and made little effort to present his theory persuasively.

In the French-speaking world in his lifetime, Lamarck and his theories were rejected by the major zoologists of the day, including Cuvier. However, he made more of an impact outside France and after his death, where leading scientists such as Ernst Haeckel, Charles Lyell and Darwin himself recognised him as a major zoologist, with theories that presaged Darwinian evolution.

In 1830–1833, Charles Lyell, in his Principles of Geology, summarised Lamarck's theory (in about 6 pages, with cross-references to the Philosophie zoologique) and then roundly criticised it. Lyell begins by noting that Lamarck gives no examples at all of the development of any entirely new function ("the substitution of some entirely new sense, faculty, or organ") but only proves that the "dimensions and strength" of some parts can be increased or decreased. Lyell says that with this "disregard to the strict rules of induction" Lamarck "resorts to fictions". Lyell goes on, assuming for the sake of argument that Lamarck was right about the creation of new organs, that Lamarck's theory would mean that instead of the nature and form of an animal giving rise to its behaviour, its behaviour would determine

the form of its body, the number and condition of its organs, in short, the faculties which it enjoys. Thus otters, beavers, waterfowl, turtles, and frogs, were not made web-footed in order that they might swim; but their wants having attracted them to the water in search of prey, they stretched out the toes of their feet to strike the water and move rapidly along its surface. By the repeated stretching of their toes, the skin which united them at the base, acquired a habit of extension, until, in the course of time, the broad membranes which now connect their extremities were formed.

Lyell similarly criticises the way Lamarck supposed the antelope and gazelle acquired "light agile forms" able to run swiftly; or the "camelopard" (giraffe) became "gifted with a long flexible neck".

Lamarckism was popularised in the English-speaking world by the speculative Vestiges of the Natural History of Creation, published anonymously by Robert Chambers in 1844.

In 1887 Thomas Henry Huxley, the comparative anatomist known as "Darwin's Bulldog" for his energetic advocacy of Darwinian evolution, wrote that

With respect to the Philosophie Zoologique, it is no reproach to Lamarck to say that the discussion of the Species question in that work, whatever might be said for it in 1809, was miserably below the level of the knowledge of half a century later. In that interval of time the elucidation of the structure of the lower animals and plants had given rise to wholly new conceptions of their relations; histology and embryology, in the modern sense, had been created; physiology had been reconstituted; the facts of distribution, geological and geographical, had been prodigiously multiplied and reduced to order. To any biologist whose studies had carried him beyond mere species-mongering in 1850, one-half of Lamarck's arguments were obsolete and the other half erroneous, or defective, in virtue of omitting to deal with the various classes of evidence which had been brought to light since his time. Moreover his one suggestion as to the cause of the gradual modification of species—effort excited by change of conditions—was, on the face of it, inapplicable to the whole vegetable world. I do not think that any impartial judge who reads the Philosophie Zoologique now, and who afterwards takes up Lyell's trenchant and effectual criticism (published as far back as 1830), will be disposed to allot to Lamarck a much higher place in the establishment of biological evolution than that which Bacon assigns to himself in relation to physical science generally,—buccinator tantum. (Note: The Latin phrase Ego enim buccinator tantum means roughly "For I do much trumpeting". It is from Bacon's De Augmentis Scientiarum.)

== Versions ==
- Lamarck: Contents
- 1809, vol. I: (Oxford)
- 1830, vol. I: (Harvard)
- 1830, vol. I: (Michigan)
- 1830, vol. II: (Michigan)
