= TimeTree =

Database of times of divergence in the tree of life

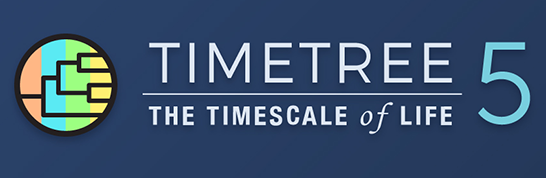
- Original authors: S. Blair Hedges, Joel Dudley, Sudhir Kumar
- Release: 2006
- Stable release: v5.0 / 2022
- Type: Bioinformatics
- License: Freeware
- Website: www.timetree.org

TimeTree is a free public database developed by S. Blair Hedges and Sudhir Kumar, now at Temple University, for presenting times of divergence in the tree of life. The basic concept has been to produce and present a community consensus of the timetree of life from published studies, and allow easy access to that information on the web or mobile device. The database permits searching for average node times between two species or higher taxa, viewing a timeline from the perspective of a taxon, which shows all divergences back to the origin of life, and building a timetree of a chosen taxon or user-submitted group of taxa. TimeTree has been used in public education to conceptualize the evolution of life, such as in high school settings. David Attenborough's Emmy Award-winning film and television program Rise of Animals used Hedges and Kumar's circular timetree of life, generated from the TimeTree database, as a framework for the production. The timetree was brought to life using animated computer-generated imagery in scenes every 10 minutes during the 2-hour movie. The original development of TimeTree, by Hedges and Kumar, dates to the late 1990s, with initial support from NASA Astrobiology Institute. Since then, it has been supported by additional grants from NASA, and by NSF and NIH. The current version (v5) was released in 2022 and contains data from 4,075 studies and 137,306 species.

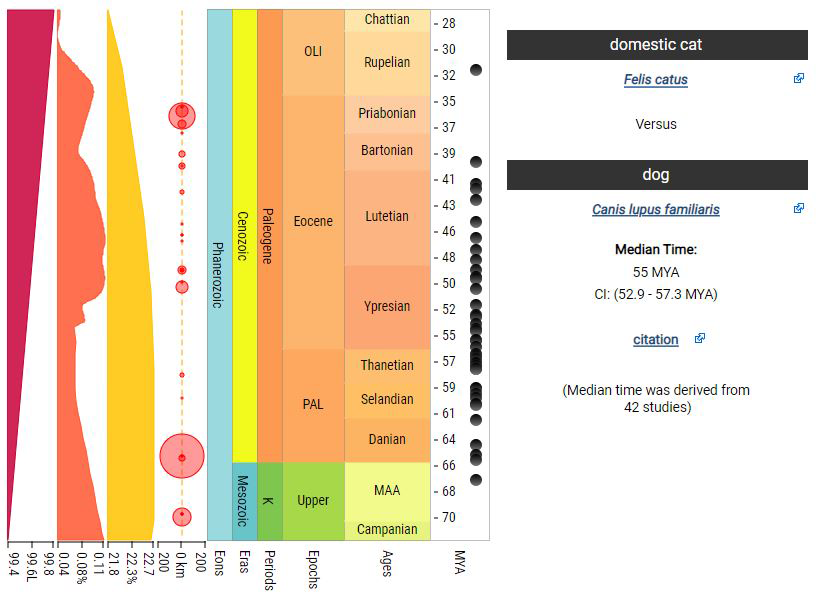
Results of a simple nodetime search in TimeTree database for the divergence time of cats and dogs in millions of years

== Features ==
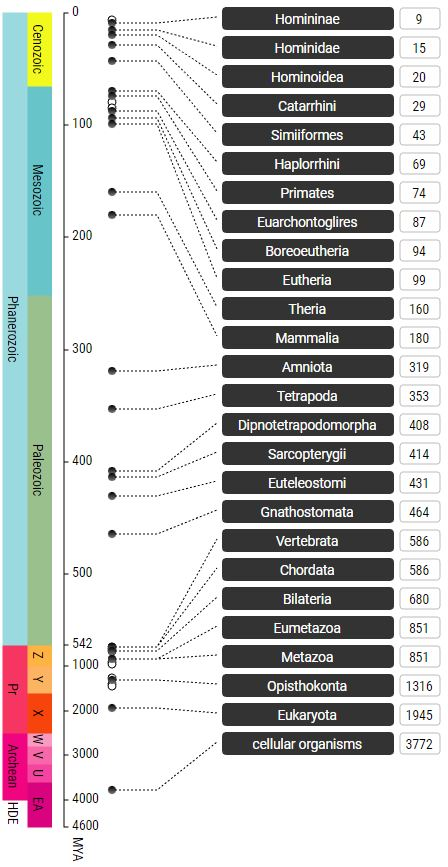
Results from a timeline search in TimeTree for humans (Homo sapiens)

TimeTree users can search for the names of two species, such as cat and dog, to obtain the mean and median time estimates for their divergence, in millions of years. The results also show all individual time estimates, from each study, next to a geologic timescale, indicating geologic periods. Different aspects of the Earth's environment are shown next to the timescale for comparison, including Earth impacts, solar luminosity, carbon dioxide levels, and oxygen levels. Separately, a table lists the time estimates, downloadable as a spreadsheet, from each study along with references and links to the abstracts of the original articles. Users can download the original study data as Newick-formatted timetrees for further research. In the timeline search, users type the name of a taxon, and all divergences back to the origin of life are show with their taxon names, in a vertical ladder-like figure. Timepanels of Earth's environment also are shown next to the geological timescale, as in all three search options. The third search option, timetree search, involves building a timetree by either specifying a taxon (group) name or uploading a list of species or other taxa. After specifying a group name, the user can choose which taxonomic level they prefer to view. For example, with a family group name, either a species-level or genus-level timetree can be selected. Then, the timetree is show and can be output as a Newick file or image for publication. Times on the tree can be explored by clicking on nodes, and obtaining tables of data pertaining to the node. The database also allows search of timetree articles by author name. The entire open-access book Timetree of Life is presented on the site.

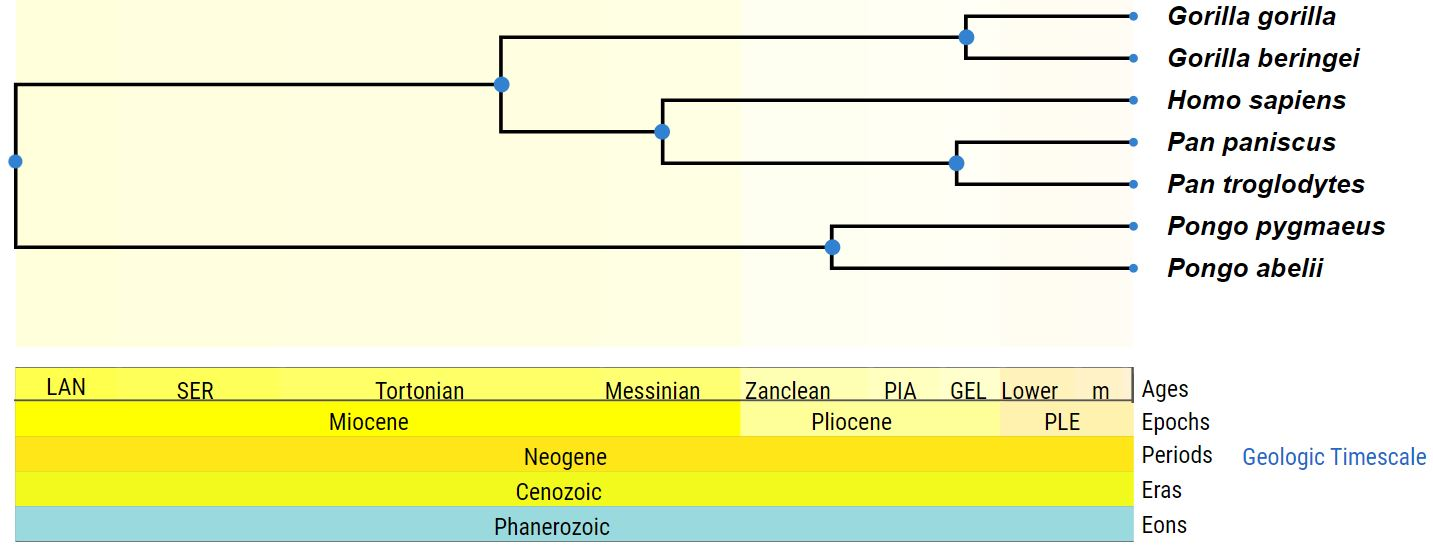
Results of a timetree search in TimeTree for Hominidae.
