= Timetree =

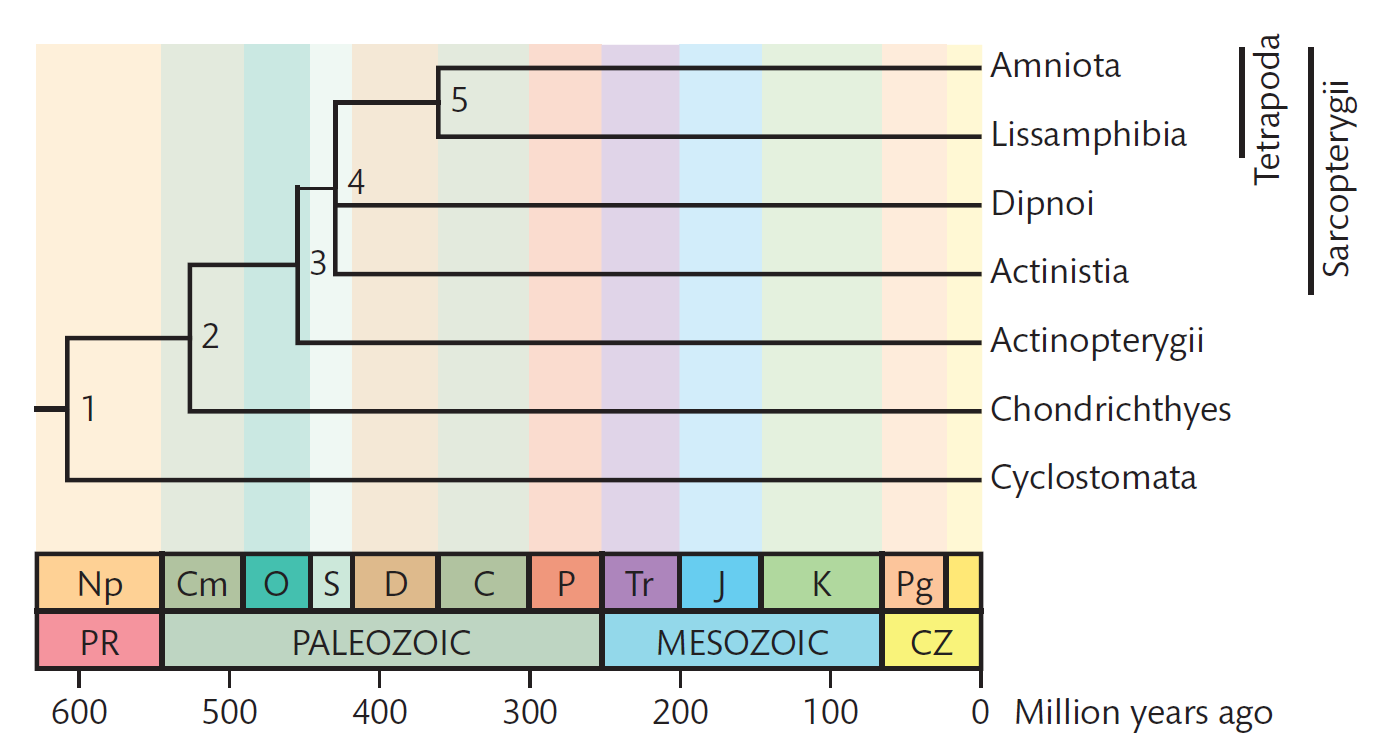
A rectangular timetree of vertebrates

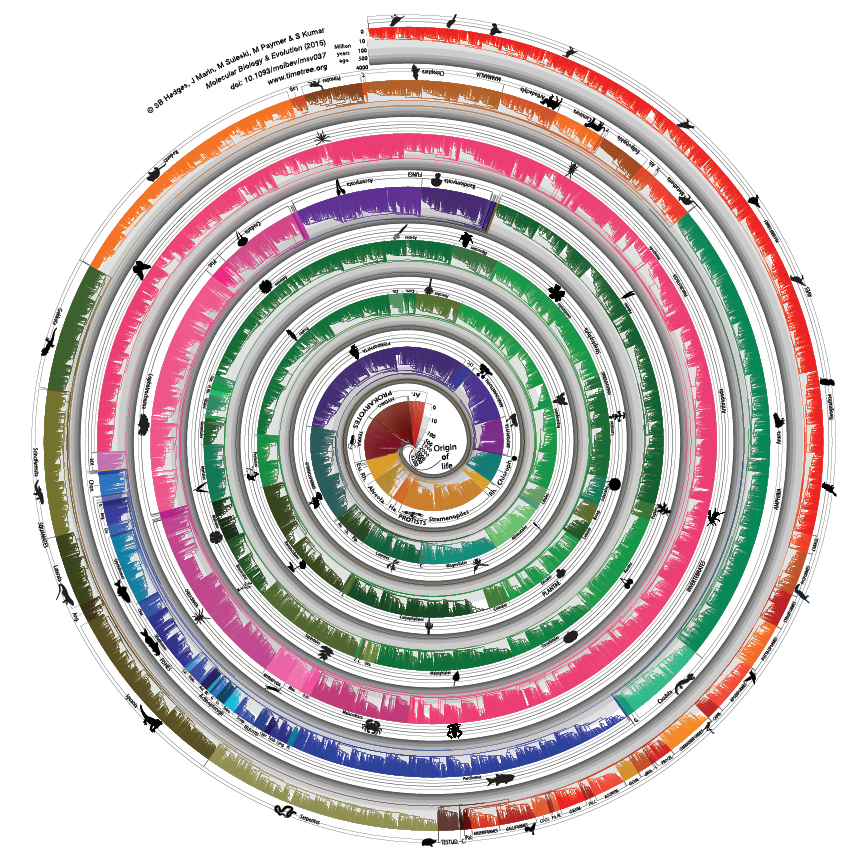
A spiral timetree

A timetree is a phylogenetic tree scaled to time. It shows the evolutionary relationships of a group of organisms in a temporal framework.

Therefore, if living organisms are represented, the branch length between the base of the tree and all leafs (e.g., species) is identical because the same time has elapsed, although extinct organisms can be shown in a timetree.

As with a phylogenetic tree, timetrees can be drawn in different shapes: rectangular, circular, or even spiral. The only figure in Darwin's On the Origin of Species, one of the earliest printed evolutionary trees, is a hypothetical timetree. Because the fossil record has always been tightly linked to the geologic record, evolutionary trees of extinct organisms are typically illustrated as timetrees.

== History ==
In the past, timetrees were sometimes called "chronograms," but that term has been criticized because it is imprecise, referring to any graph that shows time, and not indicating that evolutionary relationships are involved. The first use of the single word "timetree," in the context of an evolutionary tree scaled to time, was in 2001.
