= Cavalier-Smith's system of classification =

Biological classification system

The initial version of a classification system of life by British zoologist Thomas Cavalier-Smith appeared in 1978. This initial system continued to be modified in subsequent versions that were published until he died in 2021. As with classifications of others, such as Carl Linnaeus, Ernst Haeckel, Robert Whittaker, and Carl Woese, Cavalier-Smith's classification attempts to incorporate the latest developments in taxonomy. Cavalier-Smith used his classifications to convey his opinions about the evolutionary relationships among various organisms, principally microbial. His classifications complemented his ideas communicated in scientific publications, talks, and diagrams. Different iterations might have a wider or narrow scope, include different groupings, provide greater or lesser detail, and place groups in different arrangements as his thinking changed. His classifications has been a major influence in the modern taxonomy, particularly of protists.

Cavalier-Smith has published extensively on the classification of protists. One of his major contributions to biology was his proposal of a new kingdom of life: the Chromista, although the usefulness of the grouping is questionable given that it is generally agreed to be an arbitrary (polyphyletic) grouping of taxa. He also proposed that all chromista and alveolata share the same common ancestor, a claim later refuted by studies of morphological and molecular evidence by other labs. He named this new group the Chromalveolates. He also proposed and named many other high-rank taxa, like Opisthokonta (1987), Rhizaria (2002), and Excavata (2002), though he himself consistently does not include Opisthonkonta as a formal taxon in his schemes. Together with Chromalveolata, Amoebozoa (he amended their description in 1998), and Archaeplastida (which he called Plantae since 1981) the six formed the basis of the taxonomy of eukaryotes in the middle 2000s. He has also published prodigiously on issues such as the origin of various cellular organelles (including the nucleus, mitochondria), genome size evolution, and endosymbiosis. Though fairly well known, many of his claims have been controversial and have not gained widespread acceptance in the scientific community to date. Most recently, he has published a paper citing the paraphyly of his bacterial kingdom, the origin of Neomura from Actinobacteria and taxonomy of prokaryotes.

According to Palaeos.com:

Prof. Cavalier-Smith of Oxford University has produced a large body of work which is well regarded. Still, he is controversial in a way that is a bit difficult to describe. The issue may be one of writing style. Cavalier-Smith has a tendency to make pronouncements where others would use declarative sentences, to use declarative sentences where others would express an opinion, and to express opinions where angels would fear to tread. In addition, he can sound arrogant, reactionary, and even perverse. On the other [hand], he has a long history of being right when everyone else was wrong. To our way of thinking, all of this is overshadowed by one incomparable virtue: the fact that he will grapple with the details. This makes for very long, very complex papers and causes all manner of dark murmuring, tearing of hair, and gnashing of teeth among those tasked with trying to explain his views of early life. See, [for example], Zrzavý (2001) [and] Patterson (1999). Nevertheless, he deals with all of the relevant facts.

== Background ==
=== The first two kingdoms of life: Plantae and Animalia ===
The use of the word "kingdom" to describe a major branch of the living world dates as far back as Linnaeus (1707–1778) who divided the natural world into three kingdoms: animal, vegetable, and mineral. The taxa "animal kingdom" (or kingdom Animalia) and "plant kingdom" (or kingdom Plantae) remain in use by some modern evolutionary biologists. The initial targets of Cavalier-Smith's classification, the protozoa were classified as members of the animal kingdom, and many algae were regarded as part of the plant kingdom. With growing awareness that the animals and plants embraced unrelated taxa, the use of the two kingdom system was rejected by specialists. It remains in use in less critical circles.

=== The third kingdom: Protista ===
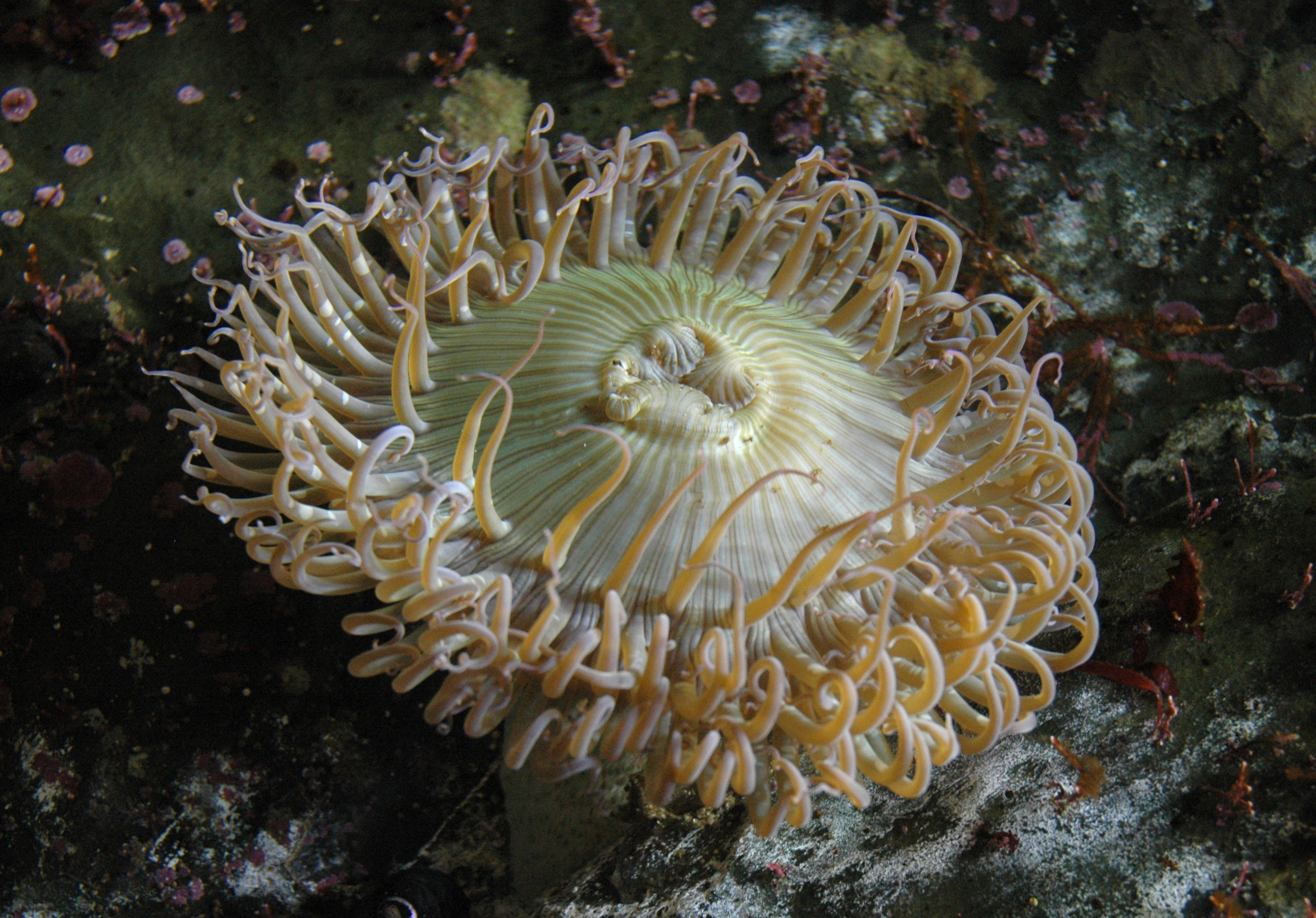
The sea anemone is an animal that resembles a plant.

By mid-nineteenth century, microscopic organisms were generally classified into four groups:

1. Protozoa (primitive animals),
2. Protophyta (primitive plants),
3. Phytozoa (animal-like plants & plant-like animals), and

In 1858, Richard Owen (1804–1892) proposed that the animal phylum Protozoa be elevated to the status of kingdom. In 1860, John Hogg (1800–1869) proposed that protozoa and protophyta be grouped together into a new kingdom which he called "Regnum Primigenum" (kingdom primitive). According to Hogg, this new classification scheme prevented "the unnecessary trouble of contending about their supposed natures, and of uselessly trying to distinguish the Protozoa from the Protophyta". In 1866, Ernst Haeckel (1834–1919) proposed the name "Protista" for the primigenial kingdom and included bacteria in this third kingdom of life.)

=== The fourth kingdom: Fungi ===
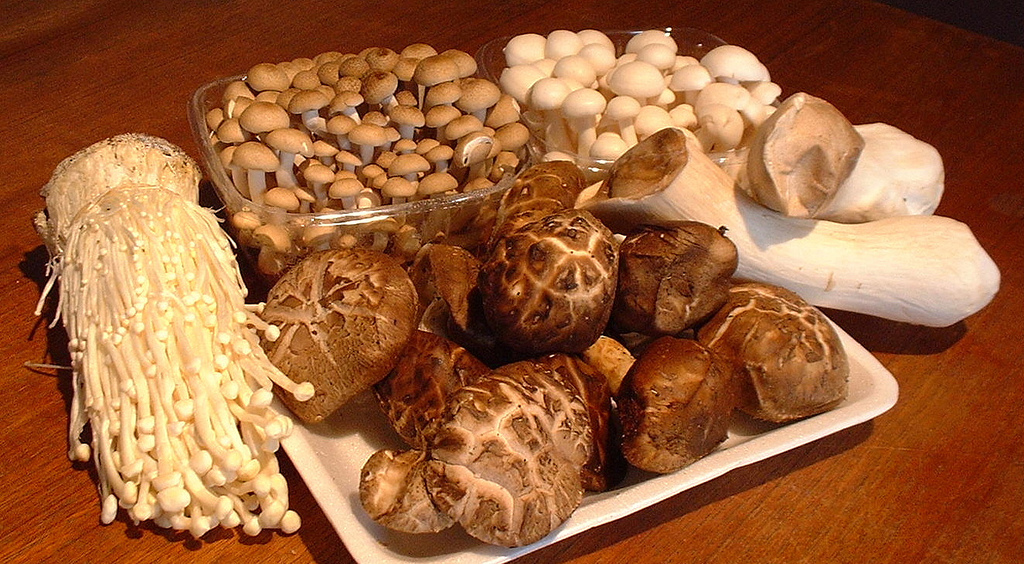
Japanese popular mushrooms, clockwise from left, enokitake, buna-shimeji, bunapi-shimeji, king oyster mushroom and shiitake.

By 1959, Robert Whittaker proposed that fungi, which were formerly classified as plants, be given their own kingdom. Therefore, he divided life into four kingdoms such as:

1. Protista, (or unicellular organisms);
2. Plantae, (or multicellular plants);
3. Fungi; and
4. Animalia (or multicellular animals).

Whittaker subdivided the Protista into two subkingdoms:

1. Monera (bacteria) and
2. Eunucleata (single celled eukaryotes).

=== The fifth kingdom: Bacteria (Monera) ===
Bacteria are fundamentally different from the eukaryotes (plants, animals, fungi, amebas, protozoa, and chromista). Eukaryotes have cell nuclei, bacteria do not. In 1969, Whittaker elevated the bacteria to the status of kingdom. His new classification system divided the living world into five kingdoms:

1. Plantae,
2. Animalia,
3. Protista (Eunucleata),
4. Fungi, and
5. Monera (the kingdom bacteria).

=== The sixth kingdom: Archaebacteria ===
Phylogenetic tree based on Woese et al. rRNA analysis in 1990

The kingdom Monera can be divided into two distinct groups: eubacteria (true bacteria) and archaebacteria (archaea). In 1977 Carl Woese and George E. Fox established that archaebacteria (methanogens in their case) were genetically different (based on their ribosomal RNA genes) from bacteria so that life could be divided into three principle lineages, namely:

1. Eubacteria (all typical bacteria),
2. Archaebacteria (methanogens), and
3. Urkaryotes (all eukaryotes).

In 1990, Woese introduced domain above kingdom by creating three-domain system such as:

1. Bacteria,
2. Archaea, and
3. Eucarya.

Cavalier-Smith considered Archaebacteria as a kingdom in 1989, but later abandoned this view.

== Kingdom Chromista ==
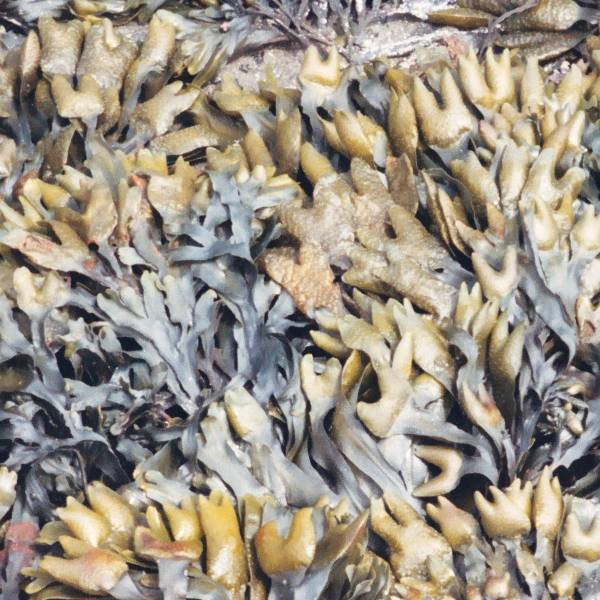
The brown algae are a member of the kingdom Chromista.

By 1981, Cavalier-Smith had divided all the eukaryotes into as many as nine kingdoms, with kingdoms Cryptophyta and Chromophyta being alternatively grouped as a single kingdom: Chromista.

Most chromists are photosynthetic. This distinguishes them from most other protists which lack photosynthesis. In both plants and chromists photosynthesis takes place in chloroplasts. In plants, however, the chloroplasts are located in the cytosol while in chromists the chloroplasts are located in the lumen of their rough endoplasmic reticulum. This distinguishes chromists from plants.

Based on the addition of Chromista as a kingdom, he stated "the best one for general scientific use is a system of seven kingdoms", which includes:

1. Viridiplantae,
2. Biliphyta,
3. Animalia,
4. Euglenozoa,
5. Protozoa,
6. Chromista,
7. Fungi.

An even more compact classification is proposed in the article: Euglenozoa and Protozoa can be united as kingdom Protista, and Viridiplantae and Biliphyta can be united as kingdom Plantae. All prokaryotes were included in kingdom Bacteria at this point.

== Kingdom Archezoa ==
In 1983, Cavalier-Smith adapted the term Archezoa, previously used by Haeckel, Perty, and for protists that lack mitochondria. Initially, the taxon included the quite unrelated metamonads and microscopridia, and expanded to include other unrelated taxa such that the term referred to many different groupings of protists. He originally considered it as a subkingdom, but by 1989, with the establishment of Chromista as separate kingdom, he treated it as a kingdom.

Composition of Archezoa
	1983a	1983b	1987	1989	1990	1991	1993	1995	1996	1997	1998	1999
Diplomonads	+	+	+	+	+	+	+	+	+	+	+	+
Retortamonads	+	+	+	+	+	+	+	+	+	+	+	+
Oxymonads	+	+	+	+	+	+	+	+	+	+	+	+
Microspora	+	+	+	+	+	+	+	+	+			
Hypermastigids	+	+	+									
Trichomonads	+	+	+									
Mastigamoebids			+	+	+	+	+	+				
Pelomyxa		+	+	+	+	+						
Entamoeba		+	+	+	+	+						
Phreatamoeba						+	+					
Trimastix											+	

Archezoa is now defunct. He assigned former members of the kingdom Archezoa to the phylum Amoebozoa. Today, its former members belong to the Metamonada (e. g. Trimastix), fungi (Microsporidia), Amoebozoa (e. g. Pelomyxa).

== Kingdom Protozoa sensu Cavalier-Smith ==
Cavalier-Smith referred to what remained of the protist kingdom, after he removed the kingdoms Archezoa and Chromista, as the "kingdom Protozoa". In 1993, this kingdom contained 18 phyla as summarized in the following table. The first major division relied on the basis of presence or absence of dictyosomes, although a Golgi Apparatus was subsequently demonstrated in the 'Adictyozoa'.

#	Phylum	Assigned to:	Characteristics	Fate
1	Percolozoa	subkingdom Adictyozoa	lacks Golgi dictyosomes	
2	Parabasalia	subkingdom Dictyozoa branch Parabasalia	has Golgi dictyosomes lacks mitochondria	
3	Euglenozoa	subkingdom Dictyozoa branch Bikonta infrakingdom Euglenozoa	has Golgi dictyosomes mostly with mitochondria with trans-splicing of miniexons	
4	Opalozoa (flagellates)	subkingdom Dictyozoa branch Bikonta infrakingdom Neozoa parvkingdom Ciliomyxa superphylum Opalomyxa	has Golgi dictyosomes tubular mitochondrial cristae with cis-spliced introns predominantly ciliated, no cortical alveoli	
5	Mycetozoa (slime molds)	subkingdom Dictyozoa branch Bikonta infrakingdom Neozoa parvkingdom Ciliomyxa superphylum Opalomyxa	has Golgi dictyosomes tubular mitochondrial cristae with cis-spliced introns predominantly ciliated, no cortical alveoli	
6	Choanozoa (choanoflagellates)	subkingdom Dictyozoa branch Bikonta infrakingdom Neozoa parvkingdom Ciliomyxa superphylum Choanozoa	has Golgi dictyosomes flattened mitochondrial cristae with cis-spliced introns predominantly ciliated, no cortical alveoli	
7	Dinozoa (Dinoflagellata and Protalveolata)	subkingdom Dictyozoa branch Bikonta infrakingdom Neozoa parvkingdom Alveolata superphylum Miozoa	has Golgi dictyosomes tubular mitochondrial cristae with cis-spliced introns with cortical alveoli	Reassigned to Miozoa in Alveolata.
8	Apicomplexa	subkingdom Dictyozoa branch Bikonta infrakingdom Neozoa parvkingdom Alveolata superphylum Miozoa	has Golgi dictyosomes tubular mitochondrial cristae with cis-spliced introns with cortical alveoli	Reassigned to Miozoa in Alveolata.
9	Ciliophora	subkingdom Dictyozoa branch Bikonta infrakingdom Neozoa parvkingdom Alveolata superphylum Heterokaryota	has Golgi dictyosomes tubular mitochondrial cristae with cis-spliced introns with cortical alveoli	Reassigned to Alveolata.
10	Rhizopoda (lobose and filose amoebae)	subkingdom Dictyozoa branch Bikonta infrakingdom Neozoa parvkingdom Neosarcodina	has Golgi dictyosomes usually with tubular cristae with cis-spliced introns	
11	Reticulosa (foraminifera; reticulopodial amoebae)	subkingdom Dictyozoa branch Bikonta infrakingdom Neozoa parvkingdom Neosarcodina	has Golgi dictyosomes usually with tubular cristae with cis-spliced introns	
12	Heliozoa	subkingdom Dictyozoa branch Bikonta infrakingdom Neozoa parvkingdom Actinopoda	has Golgi dictyosomes mostly with mitochondria with cis-spliced introns has axopodia	
13	Radiozoa	subkingdom Dictyozoa branch Bikonta infrakingdom Neozoa parvkingdom Actinopoda	has Golgi dictyosomes mostly with mitochondria with cis-spliced introns has axopodia	
14	Entamoebia	subkingdom Dictyozoa branch Bikonta infrakingdom Neozoa parvkingdom Entamoebia	has Golgi dictyosomes with cis-spliced introns no mitochondria, peroxisomes, hydrogenosomes or cilia transient intranuclear centrosomes	
15	Myxosporidia	subkingdom Dictyozoa branch Bikonta infrakingdom Neozoa parvkingdom Myxozoa	has Golgi dictyosomes with cis-spliced introns endoparasitic, multicellular spores, mitochondria, and no cilia	Reclassified as animals in 1998.
16	Haplosporidia	subkingdom Dictyozoa branch Bikonta infrakingdom Neozoa parvkingdom Myxozoa	has Golgi dictyosomes with cis-spliced introns endoparasitic, multicellular spores, mitochondria, and no cilia	
17	Paramyxia	subkingdom Dictyozoa branch Bikonta infrakingdom Neozoa parvkingdom Myxozoa	has Golgi dictyosomes with cis-spliced introns endoparasitic, multicellular spores, mitochondria, and no cilia	
18	Mesozoa	subkingdom Dictyozoa branch Bikonta infrakingdom Neozoa parvkingdom Mesozoa	has Golgi dictyosomes with cis-spliced introns tubular mitochondrial cristae multicellular with no collagenous connective tissue	Reclassified as animals in 1998.

The phylum Opalozoa was established by Cavalier-Smith in 1991.

== Six kingdoms models ==
By 1998, Cavalier-Smith had reduced the total number of kingdoms from eight to six: Animalia, Protozoa, Fungi, Plantae, Chromista, and Bacteria.

Eukaryotes are divided into two major groups: Unikont and Bikont. Uniciliates are cells with only one flagellum and unikonts are descended from uniciliates. Unikont cells often have only one centriole as well. Biciliate cells have two flagella and bikonts are descended from biciliates. Biciliates undergo ciliary transformation by converting a younger anterior flagellum into a dissimilar older posterior flagellum. Animals and fungi are unikonts while plants and chromists are bikonts. Some protozoa are unikonts while others are bikonts.

The Bacteria (= prokaryotes) are subdivided into Negibacteria (Gram-negatives) and Unibacteria (Gram-positives and Archaebacteria). According to Cavalier-Smith, Eubacteria is the oldest group of terrestrial organisms still living. He classifies the groups which he believes are younger (archaebacteria and eukaryotes) as Neomura.

=== The 1998 model ===
==== Kingdom Animalia ====
In 1993, Cavalier-Smith classified Myxozoa as a protozoan parvkingdom. By 1998, he had reclassified it as an animal subkingdom. Myxozoa contains three phyla, Myxosporidia, Haplosporidia, and Paramyxia, which were reclassified as animals along with Myxozoa. Likewise, Cavalier-Smith reclassified the protozoan phylum Mesozoa as an animal subkingdom.

In his 1998 scheme, the animal kingdom was divided into four subkingdoms:

- Radiata (phyla Porifera, Cnidaria, Placozoa, and Ctenophora),
- Myxozoa,
- Mesozoa, and
- Bilateria (all other animal phyla).

He created five new animal phyla:

- Acanthognatha (rotifers, acanthocephalans, gastrotrichs, and gnathostomulids),
- Brachiozoa (brachiopods and phoronids),
- Lobopoda (onychophorans and tardigrades),
- Kamptozoa (Entoprocta and Symbion), and
- Nemathelminthes (Nematoda, Nematomorpha, Loricifera, Priapulida, and Kinorhyncha)

and recognized a total of 23 animal phyla, as shown here:

- Kingdom Animaia
  - Subkingdom Radiata
    - Infrakingdom Spongiaria
      - Phylum Porifera
    - Infrakingdom Coelenterata
      - Phylum Cnidaria
      - Phylum Ctenophora
    - Infrakingdom Placozoa
      - Phylum Placozoa
  - Subkingdom Myxozoa
    - Phylum Myxosporidia
  - Subkingdom Bilateria
    - Branch Protostomia
      - Infrakingdom Lophozoa
        - Superphylum Polyzoa
          - Phylum Bryozoa
          - Phylum Kamptozoa (Entoprocta and Cycliophora)
        - Superphylum Conchozoa
          - Phylum Mollusca
          - Phylum Brachiozoa sensu lato (Brachiozoa and Phoronida)
        - Superphylum Sipuncula
          - Phylum Sipuncula
        - Superphylum Vermizoa
          - Phylum Nemertina
          - Phylum Annelida
      - Infrakingdom Chaetognathi
        - Phylum Chaetognatha
      - Infrakingdom Ecdysozoa
        - Superphylum Nemathelminthes
          - Phylum Nemathelminthes (Nematoda and Nematomorpha; Priapozoa, Kinorhyncha and Loricifera)
        - Superphylum Haemopoda
          - Phylum Lobopodia (Onychophora and Tardigrada)
          - Phylum Arthropoda
      - Infrakingdom Platyzoa
        - Phylum Platyhelminthes (incl. Xenacoelomorpha)
        - Phylum Acanthognatha (incl. Rotifera, Acanthocephala, Gnathostomulida, Gastrotricha)
    - Branch Deuterostomia
      - Infrakingdom Coelomopora
        - Phylum Echinodermata
        - Phylum Hemichordata
      - Infrakingdom Chordonia
        - Phylum Urochorda
        - Phylum Chordata
  - Subkingdom Mesozoa
    - Phylum Mesozoa

==== Kingdom Protozoa ====
Under Cavalier-Smith's proposed classification system, protozoa share the following traits:

- they have or are descended from organisms with mitochondria
- they have or are descended from organisms with peroxisomes
- they lack collagenous connective tissue
- they lack epiciliary retronemes (rigid thrust-reversing tubular ciliary hairs)
- they lack two additional membranes outside their chloroplast envelope

Organisms that do not meet these criteria were reassigned to other kingdoms by Cavalier-Smith.

=== The 2003 model ===
==== Kingdom Protozoa ====
In 1993, Cavalier-Smith divided the kingdom Protozoa into two subkingdoms and 18 phyla. By 2003 he used phylogenic evidence to revise the total number of proposed phyla down to 11: Amoebozoa, Choanozoa, Cercozoa, Retaria, Loukozoa, Metamonada, Euglenozoa, Percolozoa, Apusozoa, Alveolata, Ciliophora, and Miozoa.

==== Unikonts and bikonts ====
Amoebozoa do not have flagella and are difficult to classify as unikont or bikont based on morphology. In his 1993 classification scheme, Cavalier-Smith incorrectly classified amoebas as bikonts. Gene fusion research later revealed that the clade Amoebozoa, was ancestrally uniciliate. In his 2003 classification scheme, Cavalier-Smith reassigned Amoebozoa to the unikont clade along with animals, fungi, and the protozoan phylum Choanozoa. Plants and all other protists were assigned to the clade Bikont by Cavalier-Smith.

Cavalier-Smith's 2003 classification scheme:

- Unikonts
  - protozoan phylum Amoebozoa (ancestrally uniciliate)
  - opisthokonts
    - uniciliate protozoan phylum Choanozoa
    - kingdom Fungi
    - kingdom Animalia
- Bikonts
  - protozoan infrakingdom Rhizaria
    - phylum Cercozoa
    - phylum Retaria (Radiozoa and Foraminifera)
  - protozoan infrakingdom Excavata
    - phylum Loukozoa
    - phylum Metamonada
    - phylum Euglenozoa
    - phylum Percolozoa
  - protozoan phylum Apusozoa (Thecomonadea and Diphylleida)
  - the chromalveolate clade
    - kingdom Chromista (Cryptista, Heterokonta, and Haptophyta)
    - protozoan infrakingdom Alveolata
      - phylum Ciliophora
      - phylum Miozoa (Protalveolata, Dinozoa, and Apicomplexa)
  - kingdom Plantae (Viridaeplantae, Rhodophyta and Glaucophyta)

==== Cladogram of life ====
By September 2003, Cavalier-Smith's tree of life looked like this:

- - Eubacteria
  - Neomura
    - Archaebacteria
    - - Eukarya
        - Bikonts
          - Apusozoa
          - Cabozoa
            - Excavata
            - Rhizaria
              - Retaria
              - Cercozoa
          - - Kingdom Plantae
            - Chromalveolata
              - Kingdom Chromista
              - Alveolata
        - Unikonts
          - Amoebozoa
          - Opisthokonts
            - - Choanozoa
              - Kingdom Animalia
            - - Kingdom Fungi

In the above tree, the traditional plant, animal, and fungal kingdoms, as well as Cavalier-Smith's proposed kingdom Chromista, are shown as leaves. The leaves Eubacteria and Archaebacteria together make up the kingdom Bacteria. All remaining leaves together make up the kingdom Protozoa.

By 2006, Cavalier-Smith's microbial tree look like this: Cavalier-Smith's Tree of Life, 2006

- [A]
  - Chlorobacteria
  - [B]
    - Hadobacteria
    - [C]
      - [D]
        Cyanobacteria
      - [E]
        - [F] Gracilicutes
          - Spirochaetae
          - - Sphingobacteria (FCB)
            - - Planctobacteria (PVC)
              - Proteobacteria s.l.
        - [G]
          - Eurybacteria
          - [H] [I]
            - Endobacteria (Bacillota)
            - [J]
              - Actinobacteria
              - [K] Neomura
                - [L]
                  Archaea
                - [M]
                  Eukarya

Legend:
[A] Gram-negative with a peptidoglycan cell wall like Chlorosome.
[B] Oxygenic Photosynthesis, Omp85 and four new catalases.
[C] Glycobacterial revolution: outer membrane with insertion of lipopolysaccharides, hopanoids, diaminopimelic acid, ToIC and TonB.
[D] Phycobilin chromophores.
[E] Flagella.
[F] Four sections: an amino acid in HSP60 and FtsZ and a domain in RNA polymerases β and σ.
[G] Endospores.
[H] Gram-positive Bacteria: hypertrophy of the wall peptidoglycan, sortase enzyme and a loss of the outer membrane.
[I] Glycerol 1-P dehydrogenase.
[J] Proteasome and phosphatidylinositol.
[K] Neomura revolution: Replacement of peptidoglycan by glycoproteins and lipoproteins.
[L] Reverse DNA gyrase and ether lipid isoprenoids.
[M] Phagocytosis.

By 2010 new data emerged that showed that Unikonts and Bikonts, originally considered to be separate because of an apparently different organization of cilia and cytoskeleton, are in reality more similar than previously thought. As a consequence, Cavalier-Smith revised the above tree and proposed to move its root to reside in between the Excavata and Euglenozoa groups.

== Seven kingdoms model ==
In 1987, Cavalier-Smith introduced a classification divided into two superkingdoms (Prokaryota and Eukaryota) and seven kingdoms, two prokaryotic kingdoms (Eubacteria and Archaebacteria) and five eukaryotic kingdoms (Protozoa, Chromista, Fungi, Plantae and Animalia).

Cavalier-Smith and his collaborators revised the classification in 2015, and published it in PLOS ONE. In this scheme they reintroduced the classification with the division of prokaryotes superkingdom into two kingdoms, Bacteria (=Eubacteria) and Archaea (=Archaebacteria). This is based on the consensus in the Taxonomic Outline of Bacteria and Archaea (TOBA) and the Catalogue of Life.
