= List of animal phyla =

Lophotrochozoa	Platytrochozoa	Spiralia	Protostomia	Nephrozoa
Mesozoa, Rouphozoa, etc.	Platytrochozoa	Spiralia	Protostomia	Nephrozoa
Gnathifera		Spiralia	Protostomia	Nephrozoa
Ecdysozoa			Protostomia	Nephrozoa
Deuterostomia				Nephrozoa
Basal

Phylum	Meaning	Common name	Distinguishing characteristic	Number of living species described	Number of extinct species described
†Agmata	Fragmented		Conical shells with angled layers of sediment (laminae), and a thin hollow tube running through the center	None	~4–9
Annelida	Little ring	Segmented worms, annelids	No single characteristic shared among all species	22000+	
Arthropoda	Jointed foot	Arthropods	Chitinous cuticle, and, at some life stage or sex, internal segmentation (only embryonic for most Acari), and segmented appendages	1250000+	20000+
Brachiopoda	Arm foot	Lampshells	True lophophore and pedicle	~300–500	12000+
Bryozoa (Ectoprocta)	Moss animals	Moss animals, sea mats, ectoprocts	True lophophore, multiciliated epithelium and destructive metamorphosis	~6000	
Chaetognatha	Longhair jaw	Arrow worms	Chitinous spines either side of head and the corona ciliata	~100	
Chordata	With a cord	Chordates	Hollow dorsal nerve cord, notochord, and endostyle	~55000	
Cnidaria	Stinging nettle	Cnidarians	Cnidocyte production	~16000	
Ctenophora	Comb bearer	Comb jellies	Eight longitudinal rows of plate-shaped fused groups of cilia	~100–150	~15–26
Cycliophora	Wheel carrying	Wheel wearers	Chordoid organ and larvae, Prometheus larvae and their multiple-male injection, and Pandora larvae	2	None
Dicyemida	Lozenge animal	Dicyemids	Infusoriform larvae, inner axial cell covered by ciliated peripheral cells in vermiform stages, emperipolesis of agametes into the axial cell of the vermiform stages, of the first spermatogonium into the infusorigen axial cell, and of germ line cells into the urn cells during infusoriform embryo formation	100+	None
Echinodermata	Spiny skin	Echinoderms	Tube feet, mesodermal stereom ossicles, catch connective tissue, water vascular system	~7500	~13000
Entoprocta	Inside anus	Goblet worms	Anus positioned within lophophore-like organ and no coelom	~150	1
Gastrotricha	Hairy stomach	Hairybellies	Posterior tubules with adhesive and detaching glands without anchor cells	~690	
Gnathostomulida	Jaw orifice	Jaw worms	Monociliated epidermis (also in some gastrotrichs, e.g. Chordodasys, Xenodasys), unique jaws (absent in Agnathiella) without manubria or homologous elements (also absent in some rotifers, e.g. Acanthocephala), and a 5-part unpaired "basal plate" (absent in some genera) without a "manus", and occipitalia (possibly absent in Problognathia minima and an undescribed species and genus)	~100	
Hemichordata	Half cord	Hemichordates	Stomochord, three-part body with proboscis/head shield, collar, and trunk, each section with a separate coelom	~130	~8–11 non-graptolites, ~8400 graptolites
Kinorhyncha	Motion snout	Mud dragons	Presence of both metamerism and scalids	~150	2
Loricifera	Armour bearer	Brush heads, corset animals	Higgins larvae, clavoscalids, spinoscalids with individual intrinsic musculature, protonephridia within gonads in adult	~122	~2–3
Micrognathozoa	Tiny jaw animals		18 pairs of trunk ciliophores	2	None
Mollusca	Soft	Mollusks, molluscs	Mantle, foot (or its precursors or derived structures), radula (absent in bivalves), ctenidia (sometimes absent)	85000+	80000+
Monoblastozoa (Nomen inquirendum)	One sprout animals		Single layer of cells (monoblastic) and through-gut (i.e. anus and mouth), meaning that the cells contact both the internal digestive cavity and external ambient.	1	None
Nematoda	Thread like	Roundworms, threadworms, eelworms, nematodes	Tripartite collagenous cuticle, exclusively longitudinal body-wall musculature (also in Nematomorpha), amphids	25,000	
Nematomorpha	Thread form	Horsehair worms, Gordian worms	Mostly subpharyngeal brain, unique larva	~320	
Nemertea	A sea nymph	Ribbon worms	Proboscis and rhynchocoel (except in Arhynchonemertes)	~1200	
Onychophora	Claw bearer	Velvet worms	Sperm with a subplasmalemmal manchette, nine accessory microtubules surrounding the axoneme, an annulus inside the neck region and an extracellular helical band of secretion surrounding the head	~200	
Orthonectida	Straight swimmer	Orthonectids	Embryonic development undergoes inside a plasmodium, adults made up only of a simple nervous and muscular system, internal reproductive cells, which are gonochoric (with the exception of Stoecharthrum, and, possibly, Pelmatosphaera), and external cells alternating in rings, of 1–3 cell rows, of ciliated and unciliated cells (except in Stoecharthrum, where cells after ring 22 are all ciliated, and Pelmatosphaera, where all cells are ciliated)	~20	
†Petalonamae	Shaped like leaves	Petalonamids, frondomorphs, fronds	Glide symmetry (on petalodium) without subset radial symmetry (as in sea pens), and sessility	None	~30
Phoronida	Zeus's mistress	Horseshoe worms	Body composed of an anterior epistome (prosome), middle lophophore (mesosome), and a posterior trunk (metasome) that has a single pair of metanephridia, tipped with an end bulb (ampulla), actinotroch larva (except in Phoronis ovalis)	11	
Placozoa	Plate animals	Trichoplaxes, placozoans	Minute, asymmetrical, flattened body, "shiny spheres"	4 (5 if Treptoplax is valid)	~1
Platyhelminthes	Flat worm	Flatworms	Non-mitotic epidermal cells, replaced by kinetosome-containing cells that originate in the parenchyma, no coelom, protonephridia present	~2950	
Porifera	Pore bearer	Sponges	Choanocytes (absent in some Cladorhizidae), mesohyl, pinacocytes (latter and possibly former absent in Hexactinellida), archeocytes (possibly exclusive to Demospongiae, otherwise, absent in all Calcarea and some Homoscleromorpha), spicules (many demosponges and homosclerans lack them, e.g. Halisarca and Oscarella, respectively), no basal lamina (except Homoscleromorpha), nervous or muscle cells (also absent in Placozoa, Myxosporea, (vermiform stages of Malacosporea do have muscles), and Dicyemida)	10800	
Priapulida	Little Priapus	Penis worms	Introvert with scalids but no trichoscalids	~20	
†Proarticulata	Before articulates		External glide symmetry and motility	None	25
Rotifera	Wheel bearer	Rotifers, wheel animals, wheel animalcules	Corona (sometimes unciliated, e.g. Cupelopagis), "foot" with "toes" and adhesive glands (sometimes absent, e.g. Keratella) (possibly homologous with acanthocephalan cement glands), trophi (sometimes absent, e.g. Acanthocephala, male Asplanchna), intracytoplasmic laminae (also in Micrognathozoa)	~3500	
†Saccorhytida	Saccus: "pocket" and "wrinkle"	Saccorhytids	Microscopic, ellipsoidal body shape with pronounced bilateral symmetry expressed by paired spiny sclerites. Single, presumably oral opening on assumed ventral side (no anus).	None	2
Tardigrada	Slow step	Water bears, moss piglets	Outer connectives (secondary connection between protocerebrum and first ventral trunk ganglion)	~1000	3
†Trilobozoa	Three-lobed animal	Trilobozoans	Flattened and triradially symmetrical	None	22000+
†Vetulicolia	Ancient dweller	Vetulicolians	Laterally compressed pelagic animals with gill slits and the anus located at the apex of the segmented tail	None	17
Xenacoelomorpha	Strange hollow form	Xenacoelomorphs, xenacoels, xenacoelans	Bilateral symmetry and no nephridia or protonephridia, pulsatile bodies, "xenacoelomorphan cilia" (standard 9+2 microfilament arrangement, except doublets 4–6 fail to reach the end of the cilium)	400+	
Total: 39 †Extinct: 6 Major Phyla: 9 Minor Phyla: 24				1,489123+	~155530
