= Phylum =

Taxonomic rank

The hierarchy of biological classification's eight major taxonomic ranks. A kingdom contains one or more phyla. Intermediate minor rankings are not shown.

In biology, a phylum (/ˈfaɪ.lʊm/, FYE-luum; pl.: phyla) is a level of classification, or taxonomic rank, that is below kingdom and above class. Traditionally, the term division has been used in botany instead of phylum, although the International Code of Nomenclature for algae, fungi, and plants accepts the terms as equivalent. Depending on definitions, the animal kingdom Animalia contains about 32 phyla, the plant kingdom Plantae contains about 14 phyla, and the fungus kingdom Fungi contains about eight phyla. Current research in phylogenetics is uncovering the relationships among phyla within larger clades like Ecdysozoa and Embryophyta.

== General description ==
The term phylum was coined in 1866 by Ernst Haeckel from the Greek phylon (φῦλον, 'race, stock'), related to phyle (φυλή, 'tribe, clan'). Haeckel noted that species constantly evolved into new species that seemed to retain few consistent features among themselves and therefore few features that distinguished them as a group ("a self-contained unity"): "perhaps such a real and completely self-contained unity is the aggregate of all species which have gradually evolved from one and the same common original form, as, for example, all vertebrates. We name this aggregate [a] Stamm [i.e., stock / tribe] (Phylon)." (Note: "Wohl aber ist eine solche reale und vollkommen abgeschlossene Einheit die Summe aller Species, welche aus einer und derselben gemeinschaftlichen Stammform allmählig sich entwickelt haben, wie z. B. alle Wirbelthiere. Diese Summe nennen wir Stamm (Phylon).") In plant taxonomy, August W. Eichler (1883) classified plants into five groups named divisions, a term that remains in use today for groups of plants, algae and fungi. The definitions of zoological phyla have changed from their origins in the six Linnaean classes and the four embranchements of Georges Cuvier.

At its most basic, a phylum can be defined in two ways: as a group of organisms with a certain degree of morphological or developmental similarity (the phenetic definition), or a group of organisms with a certain degree of evolutionary relatedness (the phylogenetic definition). Attempting to define a level of the Linnean hierarchy without referring to (evolutionary) relatedness is unsatisfactory, but a phenetic definition is useful when addressing questions of a morphological nature—such as how successful different body plans were.

=== Definition based on genetic relation ===
The most important objective measure in the above definitions is the "certain degree" that defines how different organisms need to be members of different phyla. The minimal requirement is that all organisms in a phylum should be clearly more closely related to one another than to any other group. Even this is problematic because the requirement depends on knowledge of organisms' relationships: as more data become available, particularly from molecular studies, we are better able to determine the relationships between groups. So phyla can be merged or split if it becomes apparent that they are related to one another or not. For example, the bearded worms were described as a new phylum (the Pogonophora) in the middle of the 20th century, but molecular work almost half a century later found them to be a group of annelids, so the phyla were merged (the bearded worms are now an annelid family). On the other hand, the highly parasitic phylum Mesozoa was divided into two phyla (Orthonectida and Rhombozoa) when it was discovered the Orthonectida are probably deuterostomes and the Rhombozoa protostomes.

This changeability of phyla has led some biologists to call for the concept of a phylum to be abandoned in favour of placing taxa in clades without any formal ranking of group size.

=== Definition based on body plan ===
A definition of a phylum based on body plan has been proposed by paleontologists Graham Budd and Sören Jensen (as Haeckel had done a century earlier). The definition was posited because extinct organisms are hardest to classify: they can be offshoots that diverged from a phylum's line before the characteristics that define the modern phylum were all acquired. By Budd and Jensen's definition, a phylum is defined by a set of characters shared by all its living representatives.

This approach brings some small problems—for instance, ancestral characters common to most members of a phylum may have been lost by some members. Also, this definition is based on an arbitrary point of time: the present. However, as it is character based, it is easy to apply to the fossil record. A greater problem is that it relies on a subjective decision about which groups of organisms should be considered as phyla.

The approach is useful because it makes it easy to classify extinct organisms as "stem groups" to the phyla with which they bear the most resemblance, based only on the taxonomically important similarities. However, proving that a fossil belongs to the crown group of a phylum is difficult, as it must display a character unique to a sub-set of the crown group. Furthermore, organisms in the stem group of a phylum can possess the "body plan" of the phylum without all the characteristics necessary to fall within it. This weakens the idea that each of the phyla represents a distinct body plan.

A classification using this definition may be strongly affected by the chance survival of rare groups, which can make a phylum much more diverse than it would be otherwise.

== Known phyla ==
=== Animals ===
Total numbers are estimates; figures from different authors vary wildly, not least because some are based on described species, and some on extrapolations to numbers of undescribed species. For instance, around 25,000–27,000 species of nematodes have been described, while published estimates of the total number of nematode species include 10,000–20,000; 500,000; 10 million; and 100 million.

Lophotrochozoa	Platytrochozoa	Spiralia	Protostomia	Nephrozoa
Mesozoa, Rouphozoa, etc.	Platytrochozoa	Spiralia	Protostomia	Nephrozoa
Gnathifera		Spiralia	Protostomia	Nephrozoa
Ecdysozoa			Protostomia	Nephrozoa
Deuterostomia				Nephrozoa
Basal

Phylum	Meaning	Common name	Distinguishing characteristic	Number of living species described	Number of extinct species described
Agmata	Fragmented		Conical shells with angled layers of sediment (laminae), and a thin hollow tube running through the center	None	4–9
Annelida	Little ring	Segmented worms, annelids	No single characteristic shared among all species	22000+	
Arthropoda	Jointed foot	Arthropods	Chitinous cuticle, and, at some life stage or sex, internal segmentation (only embryonic for most Acari), and segmented appendages	1250000+	20000+
Brachiopoda	Arm foot	Lampshells	True lophophore and pedicle	~300–500	12000+
Bryozoa (Ectoprocta)	Moss animals	Moss animals, sea mats, ectoprocts	True lophophore, multiciliated epithelium and destructive metamorphosis	~6000	
Chaetognatha	Longhair jaw	Arrow worms	Chitinous spines either side of head and the corona ciliata	~100	
Chordata	With a cord	Chordates	Hollow dorsal nerve cord, notochord, and endostyle	~55000	
Cnidaria	Stinging nettle	Cnidarians	Cnidocyte production	~16000	
Ctenophora	Comb bearer	Comb jellies	Eight longitudinal rows of plate-shaped fused groups of cilia	~100–150	15–26
Cycliophora	Wheel carrying	Wheel wearers	Chordoid organ and larvae, Prometheus larvae and their multiple-male injection, and Pandora larvae	2	None
Dicyemida	Lozenge animal	Dicyemids	Infusoriform larvae, inner axial cell covered by ciliated peripheral cells in vermiform stages, emperipolesis of agametes into the axial cell of the vermiform stages, of the first spermatogonium into the infusorigen axial cell, and of germ line cells into the urn cells during infusoriform embryo formation	100+	None
Echinodermata	Spiny skin	Echinoderms	Tube feet, mesodermal stereom ossicles, catch connective tissue, water vascular system	~7500	~13000
Entoprocta	Inside anus	Goblet worms	Anus positioned within lophophore-like organ and no coelom	~150	1
Gastrotricha	Hairy stomach	Hairybellies	Posterior tubules with adhesive and detaching glands without anchor cells	~690	
Gnathostomulida	Jaw orifice	Jaw worms	Monociliated epidermis (also in some gastrotrichs, e.g. Chordodasys, Xenodasys), unique jaws (absent in Agnathiella) without manubria (also absent in some rotifers, e.g. Acanthocephala) or homologous elements and a 5-part unpaired "basal plate" (absent in some genera) without a "manus", and occipitalia (possibly absent in Problognathia minima and an undescribed species and genus)	~100	
Hemichordata	Half cord	Hemichordates	Stomochord, three-part body with proboscis/head shield, collar, and trunk, each section with a separate coelom	~130	8–11 non-graptolites, ~8400 graptolites
Kinorhyncha	Motion snout	Mud dragons	Presence of both metamerism and scalids	~150	2
Loricifera	Armour bearer	Brush heads, corset animals	Higgins larvae, clavoscalids, spinoscalids with individual intrinsic musculature, protonephridia within gonads in adult	~122	2–3
Micrognathozoa	Tiny jaw animals		18 pairs of trunk ciliophores	2	None
Mollusca	Soft	Mollusks, molluscs	Mantle, foot (or its precursors or derived structures), radula (absent in bivalves), ctenidia (sometimes absent)	85000+	80000+
Monoblastozoa (Nomen inquirendum)	One sprout animals		Single layer of cells (monoblastic) and through-gut (i.e. anus and mouth), meaning that the cells contact both the internal digestive cavity and external ambient.	1	None
Nematoda	Thread like	Roundworms, threadworms, eelworms, nematodes	Tripartite collagenous cuticle, exclusively longitudinal body-wall musculature (also in Nematomorpha), amphids	25,000	
Nematomorpha	Thread form	Horsehair worms, Gordian worms	Mostly subpharyngeal brain, unique larva	~320	
Nemertea	A sea nymph	Ribbon worms	Proboscis and rhynchocoel (except in Arhynchonemertes)	~1200	
Onychophora	Claw bearer	Velvet worms	Sperm with a subplasmalemmal manchette, nine accessory microtubules surrounding the axoneme, an annulus inside the neck region and an extracellular helical band of secretion surrounding the head	~200	
Orthonectida	Straight swimmer	Orthonectids	Embryonic development undergoes inside a plasmodium, adults made up only of a simple nervous and muscular system, internal reproductive cells, which are gonochoric (with the exception of Stoecharthrum, and, possibly, Pelmatosphaera), and external cells alternating in rings, of 1–3 cell rows, of ciliated and unciliated cells (except in Stoecharthrum, where cells after ring 22 are all ciliated, and Pelmatosphaera, where all cells are ciliated)	~20	
Petalonamae	Shaped like leaves	Petalonamids, frondomorphs, fronds	Glide symmetry (on petalodium) without subset radial symmetry (as in sea pens), and sessility	None	
Phoronida	Zeus's mistress	Horseshoe worms	Body composed of an anterior epistome (prosome), middle lophophore (mesosome), and a posterior trunk (metasome) that has a single pair of metanephridia, tipped with an end bulb (ampulla), actinotroch larva (except in Phoronis ovalis)	11	
Placozoa	Plate animals	Trichoplaxes, placozoans	Minute, asymmetrical, flattened body, "shiny spheres"	4 (5 if Treptoplax is valid)	Possibly 1
Platyhelminthes	Flat worm	Flatworms	Non-mitotic epidermal cells, replaced by kinetosome-containing cells that originate in the parenchyma, no coelom, protonephridia present	~2950	
Porifera	Pore bearer	Sponges	Choanocytes (absent in some Cladorhizidae), mesohyl, pinacocytes (latter and possibly former absent in Hexactinellida), archeocytes (possibly exclusive to Demospongiae, otherwise, absent in all Calcarea and some Homoscleromorpha), spicules (many demosponges and homosclerans lack them, e.g. Halisarca and Oscarella, respectively), no basal lamina (except Homoscleromorpha), nervous or muscle cells (also absent in Placozoa, Myxosporea, (vermiform stages of Malacosporea do have muscles), and Dicyemida)	10800	
Priapulida	Little Priapus	Penis worms	Introvert with scalids but no trichoscalids	~20	
Proarticulata	Before articulates		External glide symmetry and motility	None	25
Rotifera	Wheel bearer	Rotifers, wheel animals, wheel animalcules	Corona (sometimes unciliated, e.g. Cupelopagis), "foot" with "toes" and adhesive glands (sometimes absent, e.g. Keratella) (possibly homologous with acanthocephalan cement glands), trophi (sometimes absent, e.g. Acanthocephala, male Asplanchna), intracytoplasmic laminae (also in Micrognathozoa)	~3500	
Saccorhytida	Saccus: "pocket" and "wrinkle"	Saccorhytids	Microscopic, ellipsoidal body shape with pronounced bilateral symmetry expressed by paired spiny sclerites. Single, presumably oral opening on assumed ventral side (no anus).	None	2
Tardigrada	Slow step	Water bears, moss piglets	Outer connectives (secondary connection between protocerebrum and first ventral trunk ganglion)	~1000	3
Trilobozoa	Three-lobed animal	Trilobozoans	Flattened and triradially symmetrical	None	
Vetulicolia	Ancient dweller	Vetulicolians	Laterally compressed pelagic animals with gill slits and the anus located at the apex of the segmented tail	None	17
Xenacoelomorpha	Strange hollow form	Xenacoelomorphs, xenacoels, xenacoelans	Bilateral symmetry and no nephridia or protonephridia, pulsatile bodies, "xenacoelomorphan cilia" (standard 9+2 microfilament arrangement, except doublets 4–6 fail to reach the end of the cilium)	400+	
Total: 39				1,525,000	

=== Plants ===
The kingdom Plantae is defined in various ways by different biologists (see Current definitions of Plantae). All definitions include the living embryophytes (land plants), to which may be added the two green algae divisions, Chlorophyta and Charophyta, to form the clade Viridiplantae. The table below follows the influential (though contentious) Cavalier-Smith system in equating "Plantae" with Archaeplastida, a group containing Viridiplantae and the algal Rhodophyta and Glaucophyta divisions.

The definition and classification of plants at the division level also varies from source to source, and has changed progressively in recent years. Thus some sources place horsetails in division Arthrophyta and ferns in division Monilophyta, while others place them both in Monilophyta, as shown below. The division Pinophyta may be used for all gymnosperms (i.e. including cycads, ginkgos and gnetophytes), or for conifers alone as below.

Since the first publication of the APG system in 1998, which proposed a classification of angiosperms up to the level of orders, many sources have preferred to treat ranks higher than orders as informal clades. Where formal ranks have been provided, the traditional divisions listed below have been reduced to a very much lower level, e.g. subclasses.

Archaeplastida	Biliphyta	Other algae
Archaeplastida	Viridiplantae	Green algae
Archaeplastida	Viridiplantae	Embryophyte (Land plants)

Division	Meaning	Common name	Distinguishing characteristics	Species described
Anthocerotophyta	Anthoceros-like plants	Hornworts	Horn-shaped sporophytes, no vascular system	100–300+
Bryophyta	Bryum-like plants, moss plants	Mosses	Persistent unbranched sporophytes, no vascular system	approx. 12,000
Charophyta	Chara-like plants	Charophytes		approx. 1,000
Chlorophyta	(Yellow-)green plants	Chlorophytes		approx. 7,000
Cycadophyta	Cycas-like plants, palm-like plants	Cycads	Seeds, crown of compound leaves	approx. 100–200
Ginkgophyta	Ginkgo-like plants	Ginkgophytes	Seeds not protected by fruit	only 1 extant; 50+ extinct
Glaucophyta	Blue-green plants	Glaucophytes		15
Gnetophyta	Gnetum-like plants	Gnetophytes	Seeds and woody vascular system with vessels	approx. 70
Lycophyta	Lycopodium-like plants Wolf plants	Clubmosses	Microphyll leaves, vascular system	1,290 extant
Angiospermae	Seed container	Flowering plants, angiosperms	Flowers and fruit, vascular system with vessels	300,000
Marchantiophyta, Hepatophyta	Marchantia-like plants Liver plants	Liverworts	Ephemeral unbranched sporophytes, no vascular system	approx. 9,000
Polypodiophyta	Polypodium-like plants	Ferns	Megaphyll leaves, vascular system	approx. 10,560
Picozoa	Extremely small animals	Picozoans, picobiliphytes		1
Pinophyta, Coniferophyta	Pinus-like plants Cone-bearing plant	Conifers	Cones containing seeds and wood composed of tracheids	629 extant
Prasinodermophyta	Prasinoderma-like plants	Picozoans, picobiliphytes, biliphytes		8
Rhodophyta	Red plants	Red algae	Use phycobiliproteins as accessory pigments.	approx. 7,000
Total: 16				

=== Fungi ===
Division	Meaning	Common name	Distinguishing characteristics	Species described
Ascomycota	Bladder fungus	Ascomycetes, sac fungi	Tend to have fruiting bodies (ascocarp). Filamentous, producing hyphae separated by septa. Can reproduce asexually.	30,000
Basidiomycota	Small base fungus	Basidiomycetes, club fungi	Bracket fungi, toadstools, smuts and rust. Sexual reproduction.	31,515
Blastocladiomycota	Offshoot branch fungus	Blastoclads		Less than 200
Chytridiomycota	Little cooking pot fungus	Chytrids	Predominantly Aquatic saprotrophic or parasitic. Have a posterior flagellum. Tend to be single celled but can also be multicellular.	1000+
Glomeromycota	Ball of yarn fungus	Glomeromycetes, AM fungi	Mainly arbuscular mycorrhizae present, terrestrial with a small presence on wetlands. Reproduction is asexual but requires plant roots.	284
Microsporidia	Small seeds	Microsporans		1400
Neocallimastigomycota	New beautiful whip fungus	Neocallimastigomycetes	Predominantly located in digestive tract of herbivorous animals. Anaerobic, terrestrial and aquatic.	approx. 20
Zygomycota	Pair fungus	Zygomycetes	Most are saprobes and reproduce sexually and asexually.	approx. 1060
Total: 8				

Phylum Microsporidia is generally included in kingdom Fungi, though its exact relations remain uncertain, and it is considered a protozoan by the International Society of Protistologists (see Protista, below). Molecular analysis of Zygomycota has found it to be polyphyletic (its members do not share an immediate ancestor), which is considered undesirable by many biologists. Accordingly, there is a proposal to abolish the Zygomycota phylum. Its members would be divided between phylum Glomeromycota and four new subphyla incertae sedis (of uncertain placement): Entomophthoromycotina, Kickxellomycotina, Mucoromycotina, and Zoopagomycotina.

=== Protists ===
The kingdom Protista (or Protoctista) is included in the traditional five- or six-kingdom model, where it can be defined as containing all eukaryotes that are not plants, animals, or fungi. Protista is a paraphyletic taxon, which is less acceptable to present-day biologists than in the past. Proposals have been made to divide it among several new kingdoms, such as Protozoa and Chromista in the Cavalier-Smith system.

Protist taxonomy has long been unstable, with different approaches and definitions resulting in many competing classification schemes. Many of the phyla listed below are used by the Catalogue of Life, and correspond to the Protozoa-Chromista scheme, with updates from the latest (2022) publication by Cavalier-Smith. Other phyla are used commonly by other authors, and are adapted from the system used by the International Society of Protistologists (ISP). Some of the descriptions are based on the 2019 revision of eukaryotes by the ISP.

Stramenopiles	Diaphoretickes
Alveolata	Diaphoretickes
Rhizaria	Diaphoretickes
"Hacrobia"	Diaphoretickes
Amorphea	
Excavates	
Orphan groups	

Phylum	Meaning	Common name	Distinguishing characteristics	Species described	Image
Amoebozoa	Amorphous animals	Amoebozoans	Presence of pseudopodia for amoeboid movement, tubular cristae.	approx. 2,400	
Apicomplexa	Apical infolds	Apicomplexans, sporozoans	Mostly parasitic, at least one stage of the life cycle with flattened subpellicular vesicles and a complete apical complex, non-photosynthetic apicoplast.	over 6,000	
Apusozoa (paraphyletic)	Apusomonas-like animals		Gliding biciliates with two or three connectors between centrioles	32	
Bigyra	Two rings		Stramenopiles with a double helix in ciliary transition zone		
Cercozoa	Flagellated animal	Cercozoans	Defined by molecular phylogeny, lacking distinctive morphological or behavioural characters.		
Chromerida	Chromera-like organisms	Chrompodellids, chromerids, colpodellids	Biflagellates, chloroplasts with four membranes, incomplete apical complex, cortical alveoli, tubular cristae.	8	
Choanozoa (paraphyletic)	Funnel animals	Opisthokont protists	Filose pseudopods; some with a colar of microvilli surrounding a flagellum	approx. 300	
Ciliophora	Cilia bearers	Ciliates	Presence of multiple cilia and a cytostome.	approx. 4,500	
Cryptista	Hidden		Defined by molecular phylogeny, flat cristae.	246	
Dinoflagellata	Whirling flagellates	Dinoflagellates	Biflagellates with a transverse ribbon-like flagellum with multiple waves beating to the cell's left and a longitudinal flagellum beating posteriorly with only one or few waves.	2,957 extant 955 fossil	
Endomyxa	Within mucus		Defined by molecular phylogeny, typically plasmodial endoparasites of other eukaryotes.		
Eolouka (paraphyletic)	Early groove		Heterotrophic biflagellates with ventral feeding groove.	23	
Euglenozoa	True eye animals		Biflagellates, one of the two cilia inserted into an apical or subapical pocket, unique ciliary configuration.	2,037 extant 20 fossil	
Haptista	Fasten		Thin microtubule-based appendages for feeding (haptonema in haptophytes, axopodia in centrohelids), complex mineralized scales.	517 extant 1,205 fossil	
Hemimastigophora	Incomplete or atypical flagellates	Hemimastigotes	Ellipsoid or vermiform phagotrophs, two slightly spiraling rows of around 12 cilia each, thecal plates below the membrane supported by microtubules and rotationally symmetrical, tubular and saccular cristae.	10	
Heterolobosea; Percolozoa	Percolomonas-like animals	Heteroloboseans, amoebomastigotes	Complex life cycle containing amoebae, flagellates and cysts. Amoeboflagellates with an amoeba, a flagellate, and a cyst stage in their life cycles. Amoebae usually cylindrical, with a monopodial locomotive form, relatively fast-moving via eruptive lobopodia. Flagellates usually with two or four flagella that arise at the anterior end of a feeding groove. Golgi apparatus lacking a classic stacked form. Mitochondria with discoidal cristae, some species with acristate, hydrogen-producing mitochondrion-related organelles.	approx. 170	
Malawimonada	Malawimonas-like organisms	Malawimonads	Small free-living bicilates with two kinetosomes, one or two vanes in posterior cilium.	3	
Metamonada	Middle monads	Metamonads	Anaerobic or microaerophilic, some without mitochondria; four kinetosomes per kinetid		
Ochrophyta; Heterokontophyta	Ochre plants, heterokont plants	Heterokont algae, stramenochromes, ochrophytes, heterokontophytes	Biflagellates with tripartite mastigonemes, chloroplasts with four membranes and chlorophylls a and c, tubular cristae.	21,052 extant 2,262 fossil	
Opisthosporidia (often considered fungi)	Opisthokont spores		Parasites with chitinous spores and extrusive host-invasion apparatus		
Perkinsozoa	Perkinsus-like animals	Perkinsozoans, perkinsids	Parasitic biflagellates, incomplete apical complex, formation of zoosporangia or undifferentiated cells via a hypha-like tube.	26	
Provora	Devouring voracious protists		Defined by molecular phylogeny, free-living eukaryovorous heterotrophic biflagellates with ventral groove and extrusomes.	7	
Pseudofungi	False fungi		Defined by molecular phylogeny, phagotrophic heterokonts with a helical ciliary transition zone.	over 1,200	
Retaria	Reticulopodia-bearing organisms		Feeding by reticulopodia (or axopodia) typically projected through various types of skeleton, closed mitosis.	10,000 extant 50,000 fossil	
Sulcozoa (paraphyletic)	Groove-bearing animals		Aerobic flagellates (none, 1, 2 or 4 flagella) with dorsal semi-rigid pellicle of one or two submembrane dense layers, ventral feeding groove, branching ventral pseudopodia, typically filose.	40+	
Telonemia	Telonema-like organisms	Telonemids	Phagotrophic pyriform biflagellates with a unique complex cytoskeleton, tubular cristae, tripartite mastigonemes, cortical alveoli.	7	
Total: 26, but see below.

The number of protist phyla varies greatly from one classification to the next. The Catalogue of Life includes Rhodophyta and Glaucophyta in kingdom Plantae, but other systems consider these phyla part of Protista. In addition, less popular classification schemes unite Ochrophyta and Pseudofungi under one phylum, Gyrista, and all alveolates except ciliates in one phylum Myzozoa, later lowered in rank and included in a paraphyletic phylum Miozoa. Even within a phylum, other phylum-level ranks appear, such as the case of Bacillariophyta (diatoms) within Ochrophyta. These differences became irrelevant after the adoption of a cladistic approach by the ISP, where taxonomic ranks are excluded from the classifications after being considered superfluous and unstable. Many authors prefer this usage, which lead to the Chromista-Protozoa scheme becoming obsolete.

=== Bacteria ===
Currently there are 41 bacterial phyla (not including "Cyanobacteria") that have been validly published according to the Bacteriological Code

1. Abditibacteriota
2. Acidobacteriota, phenotypically diverse and mostly uncultured
3. Actinomycetota, High-G+C Gram positive species
4. Aquificota, deep-branching
5. Armatimonadota
6. Atribacterota
7. Bacillota, Low-G+C Gram positive species, such as the spore-formers Bacilli (aerobic) and Clostridia (anaerobic)
8. Bacteroidota
9. Balneolota
10. Bdellovibrionota
11. Caldisericota, formerly candidate division OP5, Caldisericum exile is the sole representative
12. Calditrichota
13. Campylobacterota
14. Chlamydiota
15. Chlorobiota, green sulphur bacteria
16. Chloroflexota, green non-sulphur bacteria
17. Chrysiogenota, only 3 genera (Chrysiogenes arsenatis, Desulfurispira natronophila, Desulfurispirillum alkaliphilum)
18. Coprothermobacterota
19. Deferribacterota
20. Deinococcota, Deinococcus radiodurans and Thermus aquaticus are "commonly known" species of this phyla
21. Dictyoglomota
22. Elusimicrobiota, formerly candidate division Thermite Group 1
23. Fibrobacterota
24. Fusobacteriota
25. Gemmatimonadota
26. Ignavibacteriota
27. Kiritimatiellota
28. Lentisphaerota, formerly clade VadinBE97
29. Mycoplasmatota, notable genus: Mycoplasma
30. Myxococcota
31. Nitrospinota
32. Nitrospirota
33. Planctomycetota
34. Pseudomonadota, the most well-known phylum, containing species such as Escherichia coli or Pseudomonas aeruginosa
35. Rhodothermota
36. Spirochaetota, species include Borrelia burgdorferi, which causes Lyme disease
37. Synergistota
38. Thermodesulfobacteriota
39. Thermomicrobiota
40. Thermotogota, deep-branching
41. Verrucomicrobiota

=== Archaea ===
Currently there are 5 phyla that have been validly published according to the Bacteriological Code. There were many changes to the phyla and the names used for them in 2023.

1. Methanobacteriota, a phylum including a range of archaeans, including methanogens and halophilic archaea (halobacteria), according to LPSN. Previously called Euryarchaeota
2. Microcaldota (previously known as Ca. Micrarchaeota)
3. Nanodellota (previously Nanoarchaeota
4. Promethearchaeota (phylum within the kingdom Promethearchaeati, which was previously known as Asgard Archaea), thought to include the ancestor of Eukaryotes.
5. Thermoproteota, second most common archaeal phylum (previously known as Crenarchaeota)

Other phyla that have been proposed, but not validly named, include:

1. "Euryarchaeota", most common archaeal phylum
2. "Korarchaeota"
3. "Nanoarchaeota", ultra-small symbiotes, single known species

== See also ==
- Cladistics
- Phylogenetics
- Systematics
- Taxonomy
