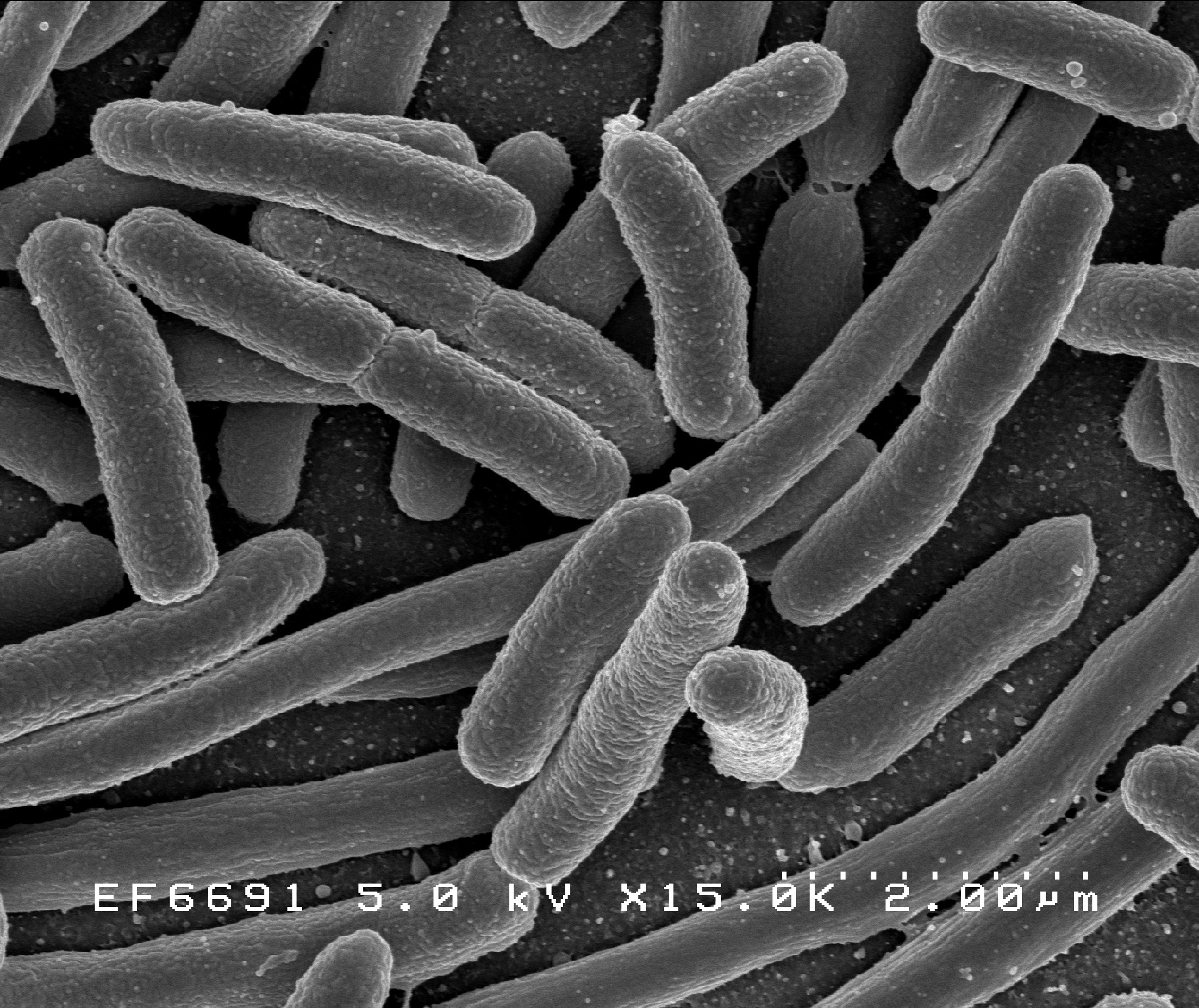
- Escherichia coli cells magnified 25,000 times

Scientific classification
- Domain: Bacteria
- Clade: Gracilicutes; Gibbons and Murray 1978

Superphyla/Phyla
- Various definitions, see text

= Gracilicutes =

Infrakingdom of bacteria

Gracilicutes (Latin: gracilis, slender, and cutis, skin, referring to the cell wall) is a clade in bacterial phylogeny.

Traditionally gram staining results were most commonly used as a classification tool, consequently until the advent of molecular phylogeny, the Kingdom Monera (as the domains Bacteria and Archaea were known then) was divided into four phyla,

- Gracilicutes (gram-negative, it is split in many groups, but some authors still use it in a narrower sense)
- Firmacutes [sic] (gram-positive, subsequently corrected to Firmicutes, today it excludes the Actinomycetota)
- Mollicutes (gram variable, later renamed Tenericutes and now Mycoplasmatota, e.g. Mycoplasma)
- Mendosicutes (uneven gram stain, "methanogenic bacteria" now known as methanogens and classed as Archaea)

This classification system was abandoned in favour of the three-domain system based on molecular phylogeny started by C. Woese.

Using hand-drawn schematics rather than standard molecular phylogenetic analysis, Gracilicutes was revived in 2006 by Cavalier-Smith as an infrakindgom containing the phyla Spirochaetota, Sphingobacteria (FCB), Planctobacteria (PVC), and Proteobacteria. It is a gram-negative clade that branched off from other bacteria just before the evolutionary loss of the outer membrane or capsule, and just after the evolution of flagella. Most notably, this author assumed an unconventional tree of life placing Chloroflexota near the origin of life and Archaea as a close relative of Actinomycetota. This taxon is not generally accepted and the three-domain system is followed.

A taxon called "Hydrobacteria" was defined in 2009 from a molecular phylogenetic analysis of core genes. It is in contrast to the other major group of eubacteria called Bacillati. Some researchers have used the name Gracilicutes in place of "Hydrobacteria", but this does not agree with the original description of Gracilicutes by Gibbons and Murray, noted above, which included cyanobacteria and did not follow the three-domain system. Also as noted above, the use of Gracilicutes by Cavalier-Smith can be rejected because it was a major alteration of an earlier taxonomic name, was not based on a statistical analysis, and did not follow the three-domain system. The most recent genomic analyses have supported the division of Bacteria into two major superphyla, corresponding to Bacillati and Pseudomonadati.

== Relationships ==
The phylogenetic tree according to the phylogenetic analyzes of Battistuzzi and Hedges (2009) is the following and with a molecular clock calibration.

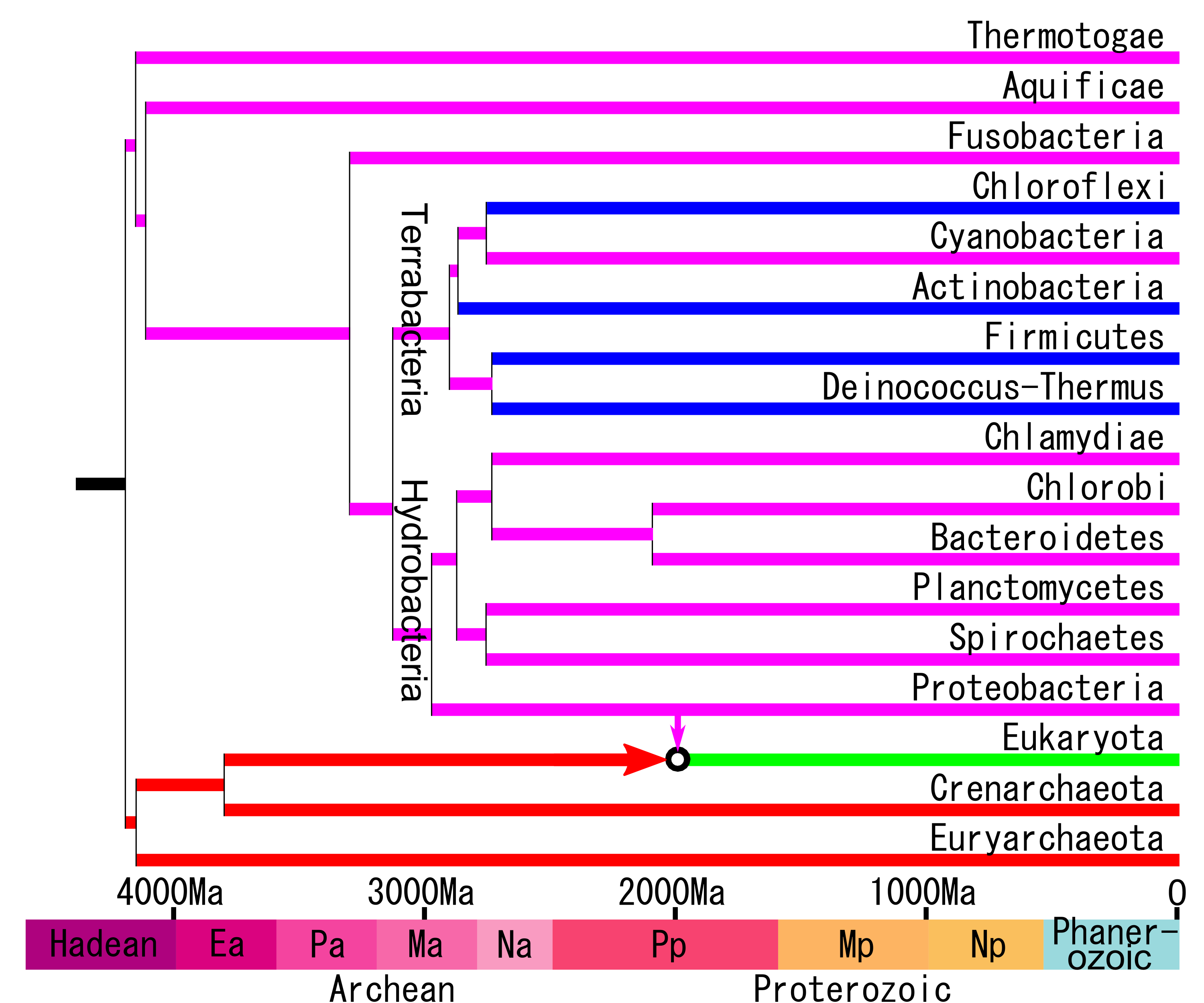

Recent phylogenetic analyzes have found that proteobacteria are a paraphyletic phylum that could encompass several recently discovered candidate phyla and other phyla such as Acidobacteriota, Chrysiogenota, Deferribacterota, and possibly Aquificota. This suggests that Gracilicutes or Pseudomonadati as a clade may comprise several candidates more closely related to Proteobacteria, Spirochaetes, PVC group, and FCB group than to bacteria from the clade Bacillati. Some of these phyla were classified as part of the proteobacteria. For example, Cavalier-Smith in his proposal of the 6 kingdoms included Acidobacteriota, Aquificota, Chrysiogenota, and Deferribacterota as part of the proteobacteria.

Phylogenetic analyzes have found roughly the following phylogeny between the major and some more closely related phyla.

- Pseudomonadati
  - Fusobacteriota (sometimes included in Bacillati)
  - - Spirochaetota
    - - - - Poribacteria
          - FCB/"Sphingobacteria"
        - - PVC/"Planctobacteria"
          - - Elusimicrobiota
            - Aerophobetes
      - "Proteobacteria" sensu lato
        - - - Rokubacteria
            - - Acidobacteriota
              - Aminicenantes
          - - - Dadabacteria
              - - Thermodesulfobacteriota
                - Myxococcota
            - - - Modulibacteria
                - Tectomicrobia
              - - Nitrospinota
                - Nitrospirota
        - - - Chrysiogenota
            - Deferribacterota
          - - - Dependentiae
              - - Campylobacterota
                - Aquificota (sometimes included in Bacillati)
            - Pseudomonadota
              - Alphaproteobacteria
              - - Zetaproteobacteria
                - - Acidithiobacillia
                  - - Betaproteobacteria
                    - Gammaproteobacteria

According to the phylogenetic analysis of Hug (2016), the relationships could be the following.

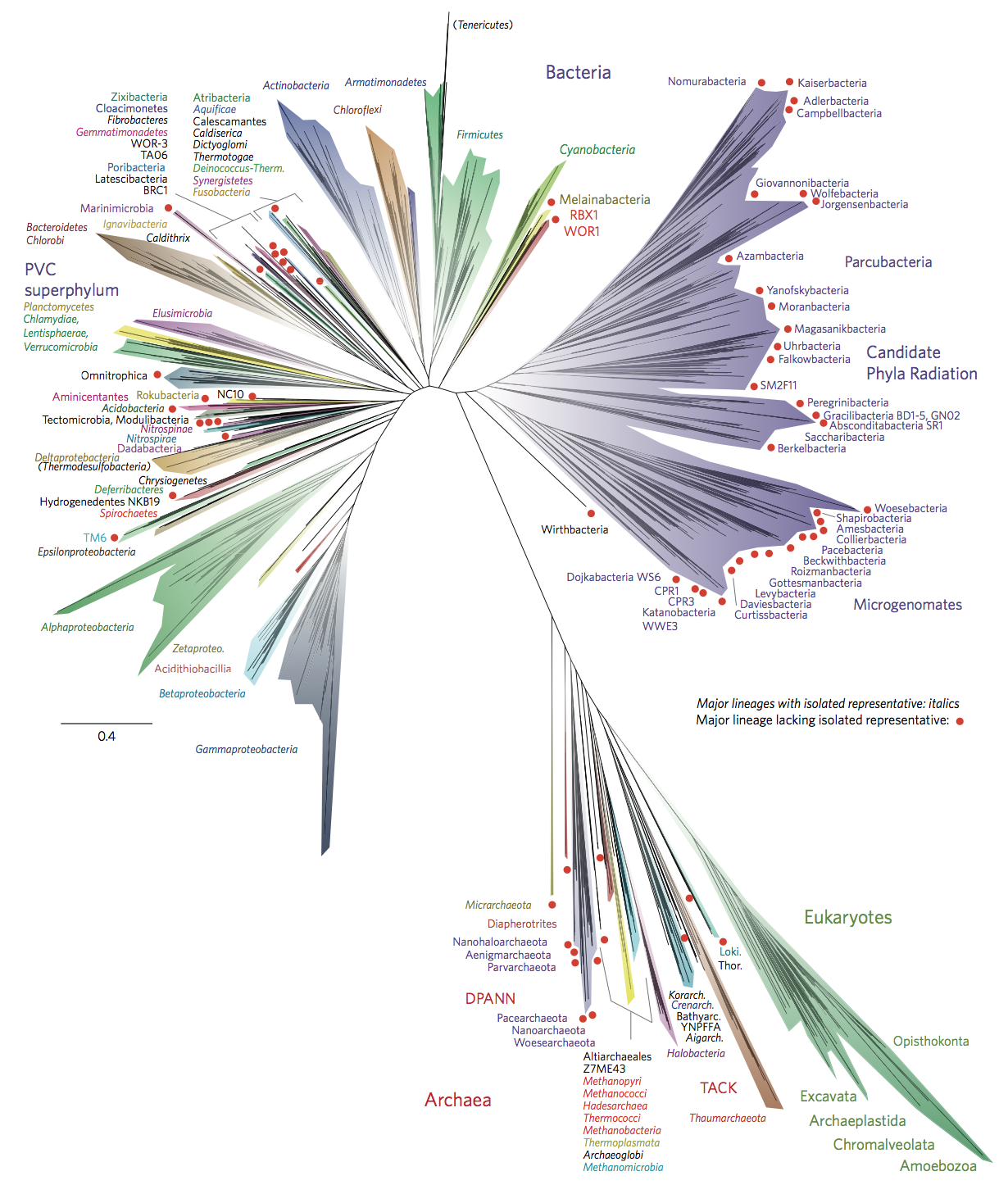

The following graph shows Cavalier-Smith's version of the tree of life, indicating the status of Gracilicutes. However, this tree is not supported by any molecular analysis so it should not be considered phylogenetic.

Cavalier-Smith's Tree of Life, 2006

- [A]
  - Chlorobacteria
  - [B]
    - Hadobacteria
    - [C]
      - [D]
        Cyanobacteria
      - [E]
        - [F] Gracilicutes
          - Spirochaetae
          - - Sphingobacteria (FCB)
            - - Planctobacteria (PVC)
              - Proteobacteria s.l.
        - [G]
          - Eurybacteria
          - [H] [I]
            - Endobacteria (Bacillota)
            - [J]
              - Actinobacteria
              - [K] Neomura
                - [L]
                  Archaea
                - [M]
                  Eukarya

Legend:
[A] Gram-negative with a peptidoglycan cell wall like Chlorosome.
[B] Oxygenic Photosynthesis, Omp85 and four new catalases.
[C] Glycobacterial revolution: outer membrane with insertion of lipopolysaccharides, hopanoids, diaminopimelic acid, ToIC and TonB.
[D] Phycobilin chromophores.
[E] Flagella.
[F] Four sections: an amino acid in HSP60 and FtsZ and a domain in RNA polymerases β and σ.
[G] Endospores.
[H] Gram-positive Bacteria: hypertrophy of the wall peptidoglycan, sortase enzyme and a loss of the outer membrane.
[I] Glycerol 1-P dehydrogenase.
[J] Proteasome and phosphatidylinositol.
[K] Neomura revolution: Replacement of peptidoglycan by glycoproteins and lipoproteins.
[L] Reverse DNA gyrase and ether lipid isoprenoids.
[M] Phagocytosis.
