= Gnathostomariidae =

Scientific classification
- Kingdom: Animalia
- Phylum: Gnathostomulida
- Order: Bursovaginoidea
- Family: Gnathostomariidae; Sterrer, 1972

Family of jaw worms

Gnathostomariidae is a family of worms belonging to the order Bursovaginoidea.

Genera:

- Gnathostomaria Ax, 1956
