= Cosmognathia =

Scientific classification
- Kingdom: Animalia
- Phylum: Gnathostomulida
- Order: Filospermoidea
- Family: Pterognathiidae
- Genus: Cosmognathia; Sterrer, 1991

Genus of worms

Cosmognathia is a genus of worms belonging to the family Pterognathiidae.

The species of this genus are found in Northern Australia.

Species:

- Cosmognathia aquila Sterrer, 1998
- Cosmognathia arcus Sterrer, 1991
- Cosmognathia bastillae Sterrer, 1991
- Cosmognathia manubrium Sterrer, 1991
