= Rastrognathia =

Scientific classification
- Kingdom: Animalia
- Phylum: Gnathostomulida
- Order: Bursovaginoidea
- Family: Rastrognathiidae; Kristensen & Nørrevang, 1977
- Genus: Rastrognathia; Kristensen & Nørrevang, 1977
- Species: R. macrostoma

Binomial name
- Rastrognathia macrostoma Kristensen & Nørrevang, 1977

Genus of jaw worms

Rastrognathia is a monotypic genus of worms belonging to the monotypic family Rastrognathiidae. The only species is Rastrognathia macrostoma.

The species is found in Scandinavia.
