= Mesognathariidae =

Scientific classification
- Kingdom: Animalia
- Phylum: Gnathostomulida
- Order: Bursovaginoidea
- Family: Mesognathariidae; Sterrer, 1972

Family of jaw worms

Mesognathariidae is a family of worms belonging to the order Bursovaginoidea.

Genera:

- Labidognathia Riedl, 1970
- Mesognatharia Sterrer, 1966
- Tenuignathia Sterrer, 1976
