= Pterognathiidae =

Scientific classification
- Kingdom: Animalia
- Phylum: Gnathostomulida
- Order: Filospermoidea
- Family: Pterognathiidae; Sterrer, 1972

Family of jaw worms

Pterognathiidae is a family of worms belonging to the order Filospermoidea.

Genera:

- Cosmognathia Sterrer, 1991
- Pterognathia Sterrer, 1966
