= Gnathostomulidae =

Scientific classification
- Kingdom: Animalia
- Phylum: Gnathostomulida
- Order: Bursovaginoidea
- Family: Gnathostomulidae; Sterrer, 1972

Family of jaw worms

Gnathostomulidae is a family of worms belonging to the order Bursovaginoidea.

Genera:

- Chirognathia Sterrer & Sørensen, 2006
- Corculognathia Ehlers & Ehlers, 1973
- Gnathostomula Ax, 1956
- Ratugnathia Sterrer, 1991
- Semaeognathia Riedl, 1970
