= Filospermoidea =

Scientific classification
- Kingdom: Animalia
- Clade: Bilateria
- Clade: Nephrozoa
- Clade: Protostomia
- Clade: Spiralia
- Clade: Gnathifera
- Phylum: Gnathostomulida
- Order: Filospermoidea

Families
- Haplognathiidae; Pterognathiidae; Also see text

Order of jaw worms

Filospermoidea is an order within the phylum Gnathostomulida. Filospermoids are generally longer than gnathostomulids in the order Bursovaginoidea, and have an elongate rostrum. It lives in North America, off the coasts of the southern United States and the Caribbean, primarily in the Gulf of Mexico, as well as in southeastern Denmark.

== Classification ==
The order Filospermoidea contains 29 species in 2 families and 3 genera.

- Family Haplognathiidae
  - Genus Haplognathia
    - Haplognathia asymmetrica
    - Haplognathia belizensis
    - Haplognathia filum (sometimes in Pterognathia)
    - Haplognathia gubbarnorum (sometimes in Pterognathia)
    - Haplognathia lunulifera (sometimes in Pterognathia)
    - Haplognathia rosea (sometimes in Pterognathia)
    - Haplognathia ruberrima (sometimes in Pterognathia)
    - Haplognathia rubromaculata (sometimes in Pterognathia)
    - Haplognathia rufa
    - Haplognathia simplex (sometimes in Pterognathia)
- Family Pterognathiidae
  - Genus Cosmognathia
    - Cosmognathia aquila
    - Cosmognathia arcus
    - Cosmognathia bastillae
    - Cosmognathia manubrium
  - Genus Pterognathia
    - Pterognathia alcicornis
    - Pterognathia atrox
    - Pterognathia crocodilus
    - Pterognathia ctenifera
    - Pterognathia hawaiiensis
    - Pterognathia grandis
    - Pterognathia meixneri
    - Pterognathia portobello
    - Pterognathia pygmaea
    - Pterognathia sica
    - Pterognathia sorex
    - Pterognathia swedmarki
    - Pterognathia tuatara
    - Pterognathia ugera
    - Pterognathia vilii
