= Onychognathiidae =

Scientific classification
- Kingdom: Animalia
- Phylum: Gnathostomulida
- Order: Bursovaginoidea
- Family: Onychognathiidae; Sterrer, 1972

Family of jaw worms

Onychognathiidae is a family of worms belonging to the order Bursovaginoidea.

Genera:

- Goannagnathia Sterrer, 2001
- Nanognathia Sterrer, 1972
- Onychognathia Riedl, 1971
- Valvognathia Kristensen & Nørrevang, 1978
- Vampyrognathia Sterrer, 1998
