= Haplognathiidae =

Scientific classification
- Kingdom: Animalia
- Phylum: Gnathostomulida
- Order: Filospermoidea
- Family: Haplognathiidae; Sterrer, 1972

Family of jaw worms

Haplognathiidae is a family of worms belonging to the order Filospermoidea.

Genera:

- Haplognathia Sterrer, 1970
