= Haplognathia =

Scientific classification
- Kingdom: Animalia
- Phylum: Gnathostomulida
- Order: Filospermoidea
- Family: Haplognathiidae
- Genus: Haplognathia; Sterrer, 1970

Genus of jaw worms

Haplognathia is a genus of worms belonging to the family Haplognathiidae.

The species of this genus are found in Europe, Northern Africa, and the Pacific Ocean.

Species:

- Haplognathia asymmetrica Sterrer, 1991
- Haplognathia belizensis Sterrer, 1998
- Haplognathia filum (Sterrer, 1966)
- Haplognathia gubbarnorum (Sterrer, 1969)
- Haplognathia lunulifera (Sterrer, 1969)
- Haplognathia rosea (Sterrer, 1969)
- Haplognathia ruberrima (Sterrer, 1966)
- Haplognathia rubromaculata (Sterrer, 1969)
- Haplognathia rufa Sterrer, 1991
- Haplognathia simplex (Sterrer, 1966)
