= Pterognathia =

Scientific classification
- Kingdom: Animalia
- Phylum: Gnathostomulida
- Order: Filospermoidea
- Family: Pterognathiidae
- Genus: Pterognathia; Sterrer, 1966

Genus of jaw worms

Pterognathia is a genus of worms belonging to the family Pterognathiidae.

The genus has almost cosmopolitan distribution.

== Species ==
Species:

- Pterognathia alcicornis Sterrer, 1998
- Pterognathia atrox Sterrer, 1969
- Pterognathia crocodilus Sterrer, 1991
