= The Simon & Schuster Encyclopedia of Dinosaurs and Prehistoric Creatures =

Book by Barry Cox

The Simon & Schuster Encyclopedia of Dinosaurs and Prehistoric Creatures: A Visual Who's Who of Prehistoric Life
- Author: Barry Cox, Colin Harrison, R.J.G. Savage, Brian Gardiner, Douglas Palmer
- Language: English
- Genre: Reference encyclopedia
- Publisher: Simon & Schuster
- Publication date: 1999
- Pages: 312 pp
- ISBN: 0-684-86411-8
- OCLC: 40943525
- Dewey Decimal: 566/.03 21
- LC Class: QE841 .M225 1999

The Simon & Schuster Encyclopedia of Dinosaurs and Prehistoric Creatures: A Visual Who's Who of Prehistoric Life is an encyclopedia that was published in 1999 by Simon & Schuster. The book was first published in 1988.

== Reception ==
The Houston Chronicle stated, "this reference work for the serious student combines succinct scientific descriptions with superbly rendered color illustrations". In a positive review for Palaeos, M. Alan Kazlev wrote, "This is a very good non-technical introduction to prehistoric vertebrates" and "it is the sheer number and diversity of creatures covered here, that makes this book so interesting". The Globe and Mail said of the book, "Here's an elegantly illustrated directory of ancient animals, from a tiny marine creature of Canada called a pkaia through a dim-witted, 21-metre dinosaur named after the Alamo, to mankind's departed brethren, the Cro-Magnon."
