= Paucidentula =

Scientific classification
- Kingdom: Animalia
- Phylum: Gnathostomulida
- Order: Bursovaginoidea
- Family: Paucidentulidae; Sterrer, 1998
- Genus: Paucidentula; Sterrer, 1998
- Species: P. anonyma

Binomial name
- Paucidentula anonyma Sterrer, 1998

Genus of jaw worms

Paucidentula is a monotypic genus of worms belonging to the monotypic family Paucidentulidae. The only species is Paucidentula anonyma.

The species is found in Atlantic Ocean.
