= Clausognathiidae =

Scientific classification
- Kingdom: Animalia
- Phylum: Gnathostomulida
- Order: Bursovaginoidea
- Family: Clausognathiidae; Sterrer, 1992

Family of jaw worms

Clausognathiidae is a family of worms belonging to the order Bursovaginoidea.

Genera:

- Clausognathia Sterrer, 1992
