= Austrognathiidae =

Scientific classification
- Kingdom: Animalia
- Phylum: Gnathostomulida
- Order: Bursovaginoidea
- Family: Austrognathiidae; Sterrer, 1972

Family of jaw worms

Austrognathiidae is a family of worms belonging to the order Bursovaginoidea.

Genera:

- Austrognatharia Sterrer, 1971
- Austrognathia Sterrer, 1965
- Triplignathia Sterrer, 1991
