= Eurybacteria =

Scientific classification
- Domain: Bacteria
- Superphylum: Eurybacteria

Phyla
- Fusobacteriota; Thermotogota

Bacterial taxonomy

Eurybacteria is a taxon created by Cavalier-Smith, which includes several groups of Gram-negative bacteria. In this model, it is the ancestor of gram positive bacteria. Their endospores are characterized by producing and presenting external flagella or mobility by bacterial displacement.

== Members ==
Specifically, it includes:

- Fusobacteria. For example, Leptotrichia and Fusobacterium
- Togobacteria. For example, Thermotoga.

In the standard classification, Selenobacteria are usually included in the phylum Bacillota, whereas fusobacteria and togobacteria are classified as their own groups.

== Relationships ==
The following graph shows Cavalier-Smith's version of the tree of life, indicating the status of eurybacteria. Cavalier-Smith's Tree of Life, 2006

- [A]
  - Chlorobacteria
  - [B]
    - Hadobacteria
    - [C]
      - [D]
        Cyanobacteria
      - [E]
        - [F] Gracilicutes
          - Spirochaetae
          - - Sphingobacteria (FCB)
            - - Planctobacteria (PVC)
              - Proteobacteria s.l.
        - [G]
          - Eurybacteria
          - [H] [I]
            - Endobacteria (Bacillota)
            - [J]
              - Actinobacteria
              - [K] Neomura
                - [L]
                  Archaea
                - [M]
                  Eukarya

Legend:
[A] Gram-negative with a peptidoglycan cell wall like Chlorosome.
[B] Oxygenic Photosynthesis, Omp85 and four new catalases.
[C] Glycobacterial revolution: outer membrane with insertion of lipopolysaccharides, hopanoids, diaminopimelic acid, ToIC and TonB.
[D] Phycobilin chromophores.
[E] Flagella.
[F] Four sections: an amino acid in HSP60 and FtsZ and a domain in RNA polymerases β and σ.
[G] Endospores.
[H] Gram-positive Bacteria: hypertrophy of the wall peptidoglycan, sortase enzyme and a loss of the outer membrane.
[I] Glycerol 1-P dehydrogenase.
[J] Proteasome and phosphatidylinositol.
[K] Neomura revolution: Replacement of peptidoglycan by glycoproteins and lipoproteins.
[L] Reverse DNA gyrase and ether lipid isoprenoids.
[M] Phagocytosis.
