= Bursovaginoidea =

Scientific classification
- Kingdom: Animalia
- Phylum: Gnathostomulida
- Order: Bursovaginoidea

Suborders
- Conophoralia; Scleroperalia; Also see text

Order of jaw worms

Bursovaginoidea is one of the two orders in the phylum Gnathostomulida.

== Appearance and anatomy ==
Bursovaginoids are rather small, ranging from a half of a millimeter to a full millimeter in length. Many species in the order Bursovaginoidea have a narrow neck, making their head stand out more than other bursovagionoids and all filospermoids.

Bursovaginoids, unlike filospermoids, have paired sensory organs and a penis. Also, all species in Bursovaginoidea have a sperm-storage organ called a bursa. In suborder Scleroperalia, the bursa is cuticular, while in Conophoralia it is not. Species in order Conophoralia tend to have larger sperm than those in Sceloperalia.

== Distribution ==
Sightings of bursovaginoids have been reported in various parts of the world, including England and the north-western and south-eastern parts of the United States. Bursovaginoids mostly live in oceans near the coasts, in depths of under 500 meters (1650 feet), most commonly around 300.

== Families ==
The order Bursovaginoidea contains 73 - 75 species and 24 genera in the following 10 families:

- Suborder Conophoralia
  - Austrognathiidae (27 species in 4 genera)
- Suborder Scleroperalia
  - Agnathiellidae (3 species in 2 genera)
  - Clausognathiidae (1 species in 1 genus)
  - Gnathostomariidae (1 species in 1 genus)
  - Gnathostomulidae (23 - 25 species in 5 genera)
  - Mesognathariidae (6 species in 3 genera)
  - Onychognathiidae (9 species in 5 genera)
  - Paucidentulidae (1 species in 1 genus)
  - Problognathiidae (1 species in 1 genus)
  - Rastrognathiidae (1 species in 1 genus)
