= Neomura =

Taxonomic clade

Neomura (from Ancient Greek neo- "new", and Latin -murus "wall") is a proposed clade of life composed of the two domains Archaea and Eukaryota, coined by Thomas Cavalier-Smith in 2002. Its name reflects the hypothesis that both archaea and eukaryotes evolved out of the domain Bacteria, and one of the major changes was the replacement of the bacterial peptidoglycan cell walls with other glycoproteins.

As of October 2024, the neomuran hypothesis is not accepted by most scientific workers; many molecular phylogenies suggest that eukaryotes are most closely related to one group of archaeans and evolved from them, rather than forming a clade with all archaeans, and that archaea and bacteria are sister groups both descended from the last universal common ancestor (LUCA). Other scenarios have been proposed based on competing phylogenies, and the relationship between the three domains of life (Archaea, Bacteria, and Eukaryota) was described in 2021 as "one of Biology's greatest mysteries".

== Morphology ==
Considered as comprising the Archaea and the Eukaryota, the Neomura are a very diverse group, containing all of the multicellular species, as well as all of the most extremophilic species, but they all share certain molecular characteristics. All neomurans have histones to help with chromosome packaging, and most have introns. All use the molecule methionine as the initiator amino acid for protein synthesis (bacteria use formylmethionine). Finally, all neomurans use several kinds of RNA polymerase, whereas bacteria use only one.

== Phylogeny ==
There are several hypotheses for the phylogenetic relationships between archaeans and eukaryotes.

=== Three-domain view ===
When Carl Woese first published his three-domain system in 1990, it was believed that the domains Bacteria, Archaea, and Eukaryota were equally old and equally related on the tree of life. However certain evidence began to suggest that Eukaryota and Archaea were more closely related to each other than either was to Bacteria. This evidence included the common use of cholesterols and proteasomes, which are complex molecules not found in most bacteria, leading to the inference that the root of life lay between Bacteria on the one hand, and Archaea and Eukaryota combined on the other, i.e. that there were two primary branches of life subsequent to the LUCA – Bacteria and Neomura (not then called by this name).

- - Bacteria
  - - Eukaryota
    - Archaea

The "three primary domains" (3D) scenario was one of the two hypotheses considered plausible in a 2010 review of the origin of eukaryotes.

=== Derived clade view ===
In a 2002 paper, and subsequent papers, Thomas Cavalier-Smith and coworkers have promulgated a hypothesis that Neomura is a clade deeply nested with Eubacteria with Actinomycetota as its sister group. He wrote, "Eukaryotes and archaebacteria form the clade neomura and are sisters, as shown decisively by genes fragmented only in archaebacteria and by many sequence trees. This sisterhood refutes all theories that eukaryotes originated by merging an archaebacterium and an α-proteobacterium, which also fail to account for numerous features shared specifically by eukaryotes and actinobacteria."

These include the presence of cholesterols and proteasomes in Actinomycetota as well as in Neomura. Features of this complexity are unlikely to evolve more than once in separate branches, so either there was a horizontal transfer of those two pathways, or Neomura evolved from this particular branch of the bacterial tree.

- LUCA
  - Chlorobacteria
  - - Hadobacteria
    - - Cyanobacteria
      - - Gracilicutes
        - - Eurybacteria
          - - Endobacteria
            - - Actinobacteria
              - Neomura
                - Archaea
                - Eukaryota

=== Two domains view ===
As early as 2010, the major competitor to the three domains scenario for the origin of eukaryotes was the "two domains" (2D) scenario, in which eukaryotes emerged from within the archaea. The discovery of a major group within the Archaea, Lokiarchaeota, to which eukaryotes are more genetically similar than to other archaeans, is not consistent with the Neomura hypothesis. Instead, it supports the hypothesis that eukaryotes emerged from within one group of archaeans:

- - Bacteria
  - - archaeans
    - - archaeans
      - Eukaryota

A 2016 study using 16 universally-conserved ribosomal proteins supports the two domain view. Its "new view of the tree of life" shows eukaryotes as a small group nested within Archaea, in particular within the TACK superphylum. However, the origin of eukaryotes remains unresolved, and the two domain and three domain scenarios remain viable hypotheses.

=== One domain view ===
An alternative to the placement of Eukaryota within Archaea is that both domains evolved from within Bacteria, which is then the ancestral group. This view is similar to the derived clade view above, but the bacterial group involved is different. The evidence for this phylogeny includes the detection of membrane coat proteins and of processes related to phagocytosis in the bacterial Planctomycetes. Although Archaea and Eukaryota are sisters in this view, their joint sister is a bacterial group called PVC for short (the Planctomycetes-Verrucomicrobia-Chlamydiae superphylum):

- - various groups of bacteria
  - - PVC bacteria
    - - Archaea
      - Eukaryota

On this view, the traditional Bacteria taxon is paraphyletic. Eukaryotes were not formed by a symbiotic merger between an archaeon and a bacterium, but by the merger of two bacteria, albeit that one was highly modified. In a 2020 paper, Cavalier-Smith accepted the planctobacterial origins of Archaea and Eukaryota, noting that the evidence was not sufficient to safely distinguish between the two possibilities that eukaryotes are sisters of all archaea (as shown in the cladogram above) or that eukaryotes evolved from filarchaeotes, i.e. within Archaea (the two-domain view above).

== See also ==
- Protocell
