= Three-domain system =

Hypothesis for classification of life

A phylogenetic tree based on rRNA data, emphasizing the separation of bacteria, archaea, and eukarya as proposed by Carl Woese et al. in 1990, with the hypothetical last universal common ancestor

The three-domain system is a taxonomic classification system that groups all cellular life into three domains, namely Archaea, Bacteria and Eukarya, introduced by Carl Woese, Otto Kandler and Mark Wheelis in 1990. The key difference from earlier classifications such as the two-empire system and the five-kingdom classification is the splitting of Archaea (previously named "archaebacteria") from Bacteria as completely different organisms.

The three-domain system has been contested by scientists who believe that eukaryotes do not form a separate domain of life, but instead represent a clade alongside the Archaea, in a single shared domain.

A consensus has emerged that eukaryotes evolved from an archaeal host with affinities to living Asgard archaea, in combination with an endosymbiont belonging to or closely related to Alphaproteobacteria, rather than eukaryotes being separate sister grouping to Archaea.

== Background ==
Woese argued, on the basis of differences in 16S rRNA genes, that bacteria, archaea, and eukaryotes each arose separately from an ancestor with poorly developed genetic machinery, often called a progenote. To reflect these primary lines of descent, he treated each as a domain, divided into several different kingdoms. Originally his split of the prokaryotes was into Eubacteria (now Bacteria) and Archaebacteria (now Archaea). Woese initially used the term "kingdom" to refer to the three primary phylogenic groupings, and this nomenclature was widely used until the term "domain" was adopted in 1990.

Acceptance of the validity of Woese's phylogenetically valid classification was a slow process. Prominent biologists including Salvador Luria and Ernst Mayr objected to his division of the prokaryotes. Not all criticism of him was restricted to the scientific level. A decade of labor-intensive oligonucleotide cataloging left him with a reputation as "a crank", and Woese would go on to be dubbed "Microbiology's Scarred Revolutionary" by a news article printed in the journal Science in 1997. The growing amount of supporting data led the scientific community to accept the Archaea by the mid-1980s. Today, very few scientists still accept the concept of a unified Prokarya.

== Classification ==
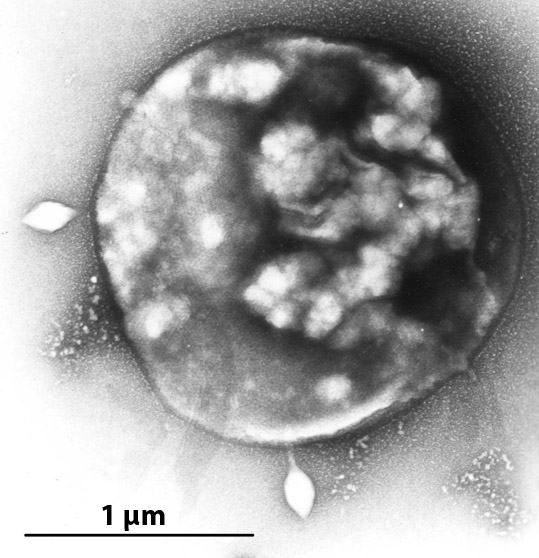
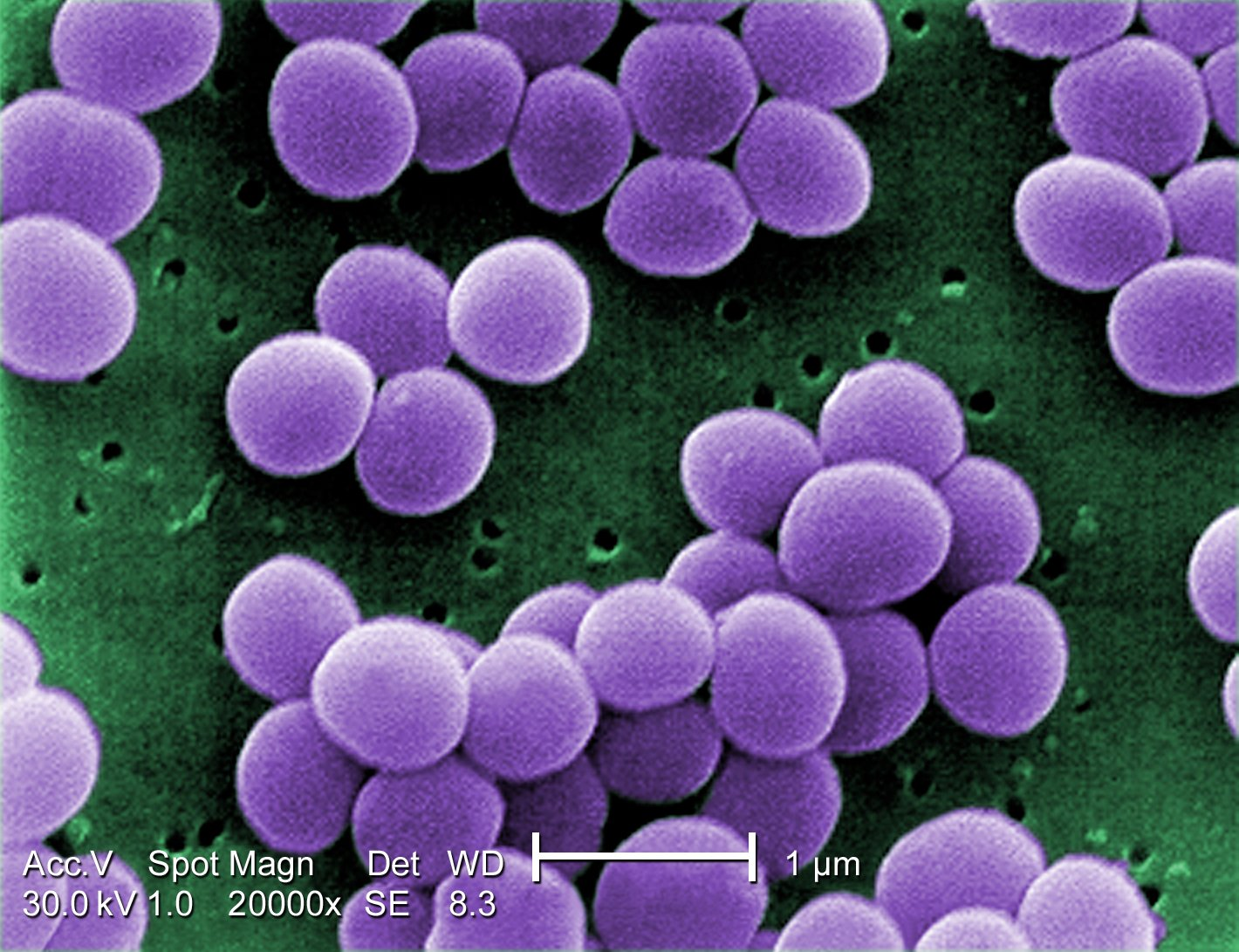
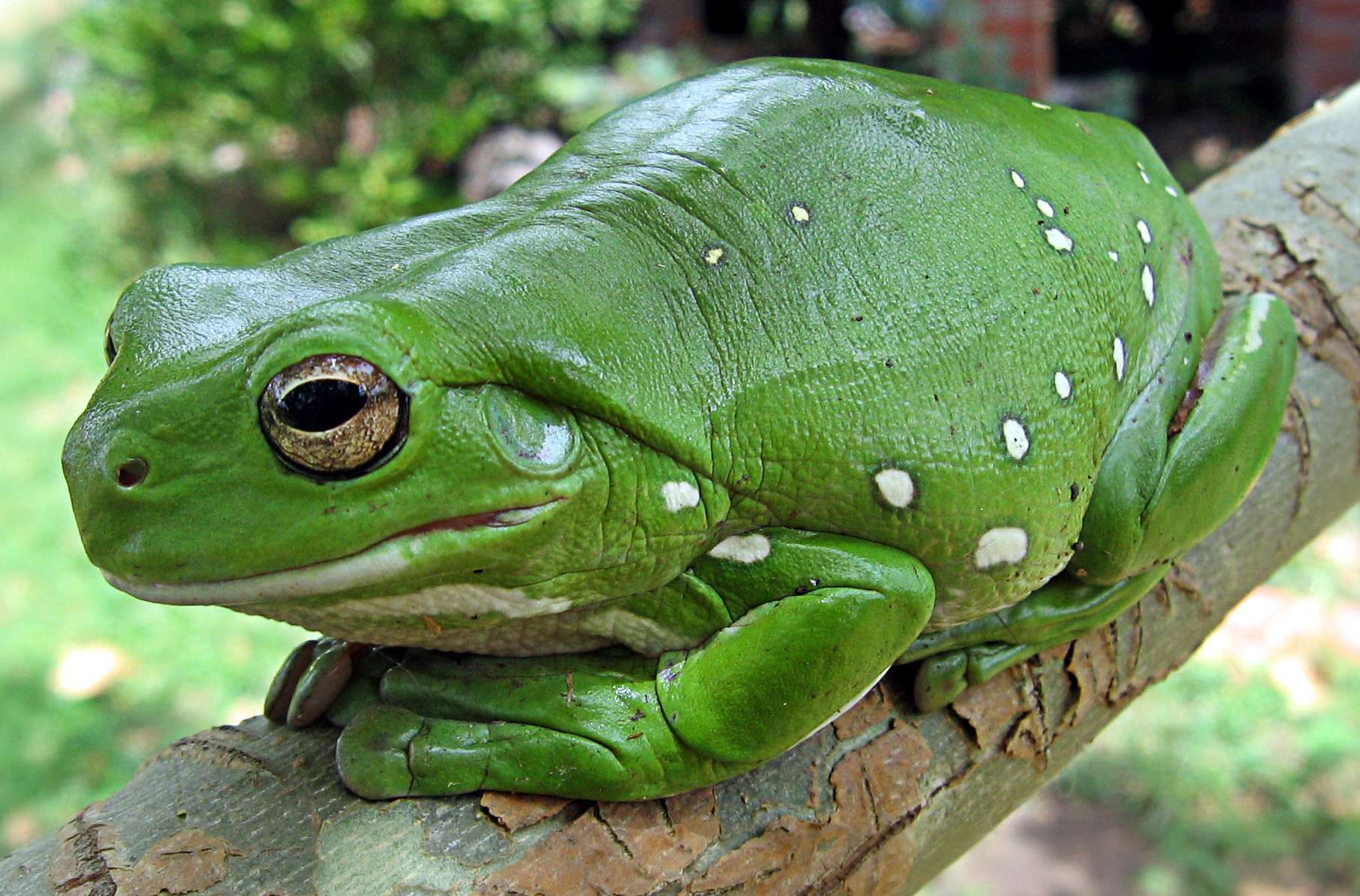
The three-domain system includes the Archaea (represented by Sulfolobus, left), Bacteria (represented by Staphylococcus aureus, middle) and eukaryotes (represented by the Australian green tree frog, right).

The three-domain system adds a level of classification (the domains) "above" the kingdoms present in the previously used five- or six-kingdom systems. This classification system recognizes the fundamental divide between the two prokaryotic groups, insofar as Archaea appear to be more closely related to eukaryotes than they are to other prokaryotes – bacteria-like organisms with no cell nucleus. The three-domain system sorts the previously known kingdoms into these three domains: Archaea, Bacteria, and Eukarya.

=== Domain Archaea ===
The Archaea are prokaryotic, with no nuclear membrane, but with biochemistry and RNA markers that are distinct from bacteria. The archaeans possess unique, ancient evolutionary history for which they are considered some of the oldest species of organisms on Earth, most notably their diverse, exotic metabolisms.

Some examples of archaeal organisms are:

- methanogens – which produce the gas methane
- halophiles – which live in very salty water
- thermoacidophiles – which thrive in acidic high-temperature water

=== Domain Bacteria ===
The Bacteria are also prokaryotic; their domain consists of cells with bacterial rRNA, no nuclear membrane, and whose membranes possess primarily diacyl glycerol diester lipids. Traditionally classified as bacteria, many thrive in the same environments favored by humans, and were the first prokaryotes discovered; they were briefly called the Eubacteria or "true" bacteria when the Archaea were first recognized as a distinct clade.

Most known pathogenic prokaryotic organisms belong to bacteria (see for exceptions). For that reason, and because the Archaea are typically difficult to grow in laboratories, Bacteria are currently studied more extensively than Archaea.

Some examples of bacteria include:

- "Cyanobacteria" – photosynthesizing bacteria that are related to the chloroplasts of eukaryotic plants and algae
- Spirochaetota – Gram-negative bacteria that include those causing syphilis and Lyme disease
- Actinomycetota – Gram-positive bacteria including Bifidobacterium animalis which is present in the human large intestine

=== Domain Eukarya ===
Eukaryota are organisms whose cells contain a membrane-bound nucleus. They include many large single-celled organisms and all known non-microscopic organisms. The domain contains, for example:

- Holomycota – mushrooms and allies
- Viridiplantae – green plants
- Holozoa – animals and allies
- Stramenopiles – includes brown algae
- Amoebozoa – solitary and social amoebae
- Discoba – includes euglenoids

== Niches ==
Each of the three cell types tends to fit into recurring specialities or roles. Bacteria tend to be the most prolific reproducers, at least in moderate environments. Archaeans tend to adapt quickly to extreme environments, such as high temperatures, high acids, high sulfur, etc. This includes adapting to use a wide variety of food sources. Eukaryotes are the most flexible with regard to forming cooperative colonies, such as in multi-cellular organisms, including humans. In fact, the structure of a eukaryote is likely to have derived from a joining of different cell types, forming organelles.

Parakaryon myojinensis (incertae sedis) is a single-celled organism known to be a unique example. "This organism appears to be a life form distinct from prokaryotes and eukaryotes", with features of both.

== Alternatives ==
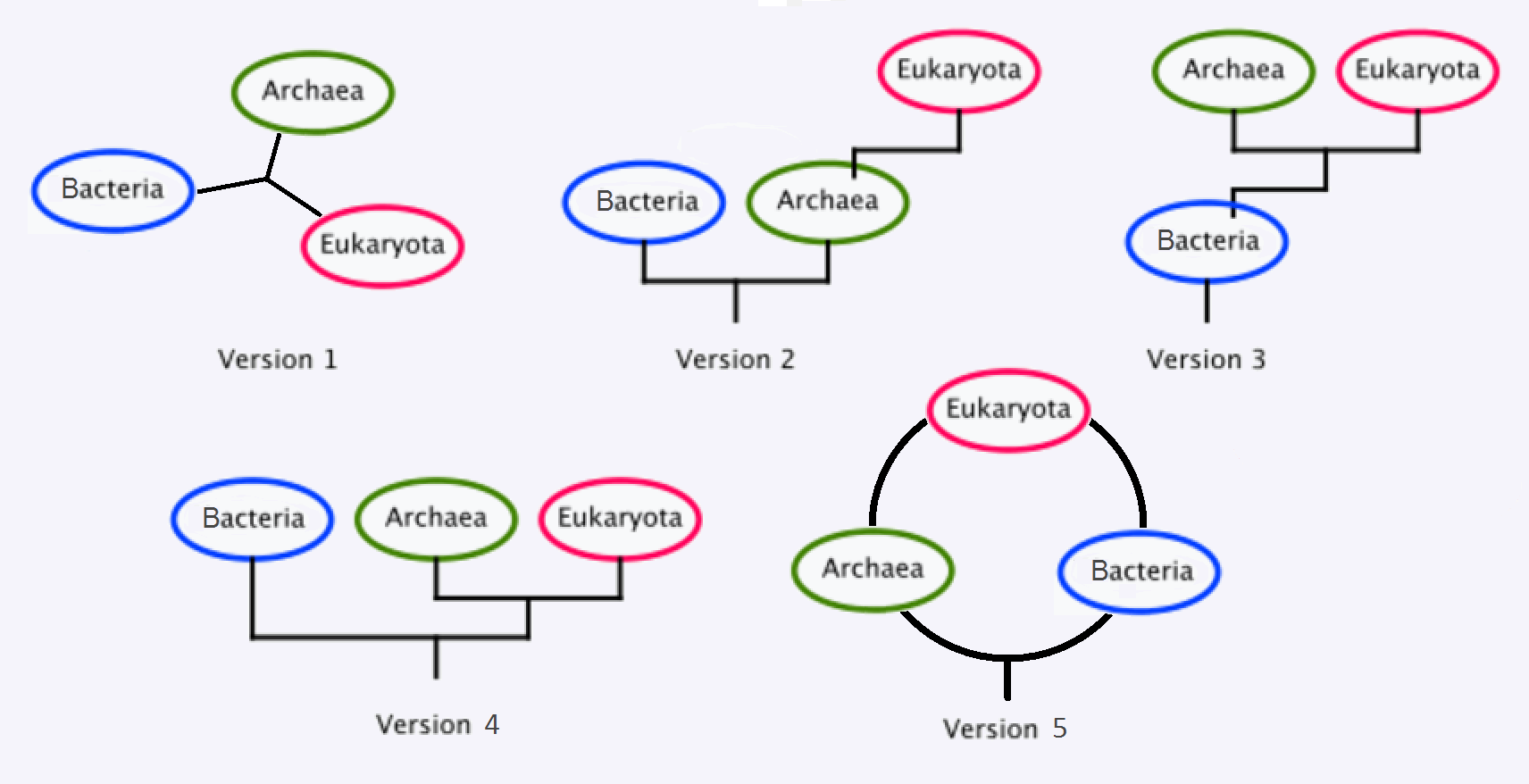
Alternative versions of the three domains of life's phylogeny

Parts of the three-domain theory have been challenged by scientists including Ernst Mayr, Thomas Cavalier-Smith, and Radhey S. Gupta.

Recent work has proposed that Eukaryota may have actually branched off from the domain Archaea. According to Spang et al., Lokiarchaeota forms a monophyletic group with eukaryotes in phylogenomic analyses. The associated genomes also encode an expanded repertoire of eukaryotic signature proteins that are suggestive of sophisticated membrane remodelling capabilities. This work suggests a two-domain system as opposed to the three-domain system. Exactly how and when Archaea, Bacteria, and Eucarya developed and how they are related continues to be debated. By the mid 2020s, the idea that the host cell of eukaryotes had evolved from Asgard archaea was widely accepted. The genome of living eukaryotes is composed of both archaeal and bacterial DNA, with bacterial DNA predominating, at least some of which comes from Alphaproteobacteria, likely from an endosymbiont within the ancestral eukaryote cell, though some of the bacterial DNA may come from separate gene transfers from other bacterial lineages.

== See also ==
- Two-domain system
- Neomura
- Bacterial phyla
- Eocyte hypothesis
- Taxonomy
- Two-empire system
