= Problognathia =

Scientific classification
- Kingdom: Animalia
- Phylum: Gnathostomulida
- Order: Bursovaginoidea
- Family: Problognathiidae; Sterrer & Farris, 1975
- Genus: Problognathia; Sterrer & Farris, 1975
- Species: P. minima

Binomial name
- Problognathia minima Sterrer & Farris, 1975

Genus of jaw worms

Problognathia is a monotypic genus of worms belonging to the monotypic family Problognathiidae. The only species is Problognathia minima, also known as the problematic jaw worm.

The species is found in Bermuda.
