= Agnathiellidae =

Scientific classification
- Kingdom: Animalia
- Phylum: Gnathostomulida
- Order: Bursovaginoidea
- Family: Agnathiellidae; Sterrer, 1972

Family of jaw worms

Agnathiellidae is a family of worms belonging to the order Bursovaginoidea.

Genera:

- Agnathiella Sterrer, 1971
- Paragnathiella Sterrer, 1997
