= Thomas Cavalier-Smith =

British evolutionary biologist (1942–2021)

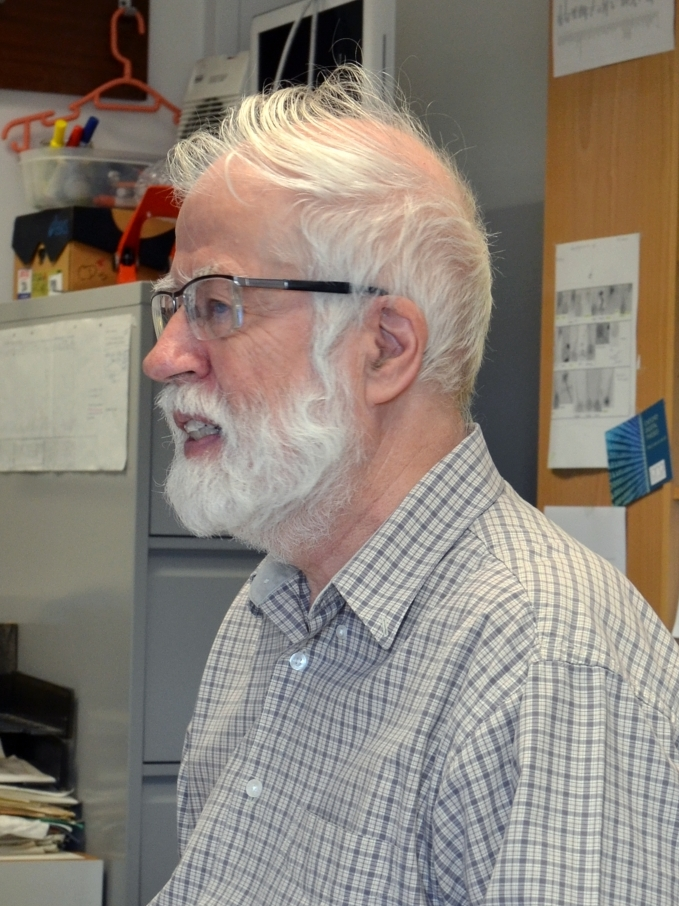
- Cavalier-Smith in 2013
- Born: 21 October 1942; London, United Kingdom
- Died: 19 March 2021 (aged 78)
- Education: Gonville and Caius College Cambridge, King's College London
- Known for: Cavalier-Smith's system of classification of all organisms
- Awards: Fellow of the Royal Society (1998); International Prize for Biology (2004); The Linnean Medal (2007); Frink Medal (2007)
- Scientific career
- Fields: Protistology; Systematics
- Workplaces: King's College London, University of British Columbia, University of Oxford
- Thesis: Organelle Development in Chlamydomonas reinhardii (1967)
- Website: www.zoo.ox.ac.uk/people/view/cavaliersmith_t.htm

Thomas (Tom) Cavalier-Smith, FRS, FRSC, NERC Professorial Fellow (21 October 1942 – 19 March 2021), was a professor of evolutionary biology in the Department of Zoology, at the University of Oxford.

His research has led to discovery of a number of unicellular organisms (protists) and advocated for a variety of major taxonomic groups, such as the Chromista, Chromalveolata, Opisthokonta, Rhizaria, and Excavata. He was known for his systems of classification of all organisms.

== Life and career ==
Cavalier-Smith was born on 21 October 1942 in London. His parents were Mary Maude (née Bratt) and Alan Hailes Spencer Cavalier Smith.

He was educated at Norwich School, Gonville and Caius College, Cambridge (MA) in Biology and King's College London (PhD) in Zoology. He was under the supervision of Sir John Randall for his PhD thesis between 1964 and 1967; his thesis was entitled "Organelle Development in Chlamydomonas reinhardii".

From 1967 to 1969, Cavalier-Smith was a guest investigator at Rockefeller University. He became Lecturer of biophysics at King's College London in 1969. He was promoted to Reader in 1982. From the early 1980s, Smith promoted views about the taxonomic relationships among living organisms. He was prolific, drawing on a near-unparalleled wealth of information to suggest novel relationships. In 1989 he was appointed Professor of Botany at the University of British Columbia. In 1999, he joined the University of Oxford, becoming Professor of evolutionary biology in 2000.

Thomas Cavalier-Smith died in March 2021 following the development of cancer.

=== Taxonomy ===
Cavalier-Smith was a prolific taxonomist, drawing on a near-unparalleled wealth of information to suggest novel relationships. His suggestions were translated into taxonomic concepts and classifications with which he associated new names, or in some cases, reused old names. Cavalier-Smith did not follow or espouse an explicit taxonomic philosophy but his approach was closest to evolutionary taxonomy. He and several other colleagues were opposed to cladistic approaches to taxonomy arguing that the goals of cladification and classification were different; his approach was similar to that of many others' broad-based treatments of protists.

The scope of Cavalier-Smith's taxonomic propositions was grand, but the numbers and composition of the components (taxa), and, often, their relations were not stable. Propositions were often ambiguous and short-lived; he frequently amended taxa without any change in the name. His approach was not universally accepted: Others attempted to underpin taxonomy of protists with a nested series of atomised, falsifiable propositions, following the philosophy of transformed cladistics. However, this approach is no longer considered defensible.

Cavalier-Smith's ideas that led to the taxonomic structures were usually first presented in the form of tables and complex, annotated diagrams. When presented at scientific meetings, they were sometimes too rich, and often written too small, for the ideas to be easily grasped. Some such diagrams made their way into publications, where careful scrutiny was possible, and where the conjectural nature of some assertions was evident. The richness of his ideas, their continuing evolution, and the transition into taxonomies that gave Cavalier-Smith's investigations into evolutionary paths (phylogeny) and the resulting classifications, its distinctive character.

== Writing style ==
Cavalier-Smith's particular style was a source of controversy throughout his career, often being a source of taxonimic confusion among colleagues.

Because of Cavalier-Smith's tendency to publish rapidly and frequently change his narratives and taxonomic summaries, his approach and claims were frequently debated. Cavalier-Smith also reused familiar names (such as Protozoa) for innovative taxonomic concepts. This created confusion because Protozoa was and still is used in its old sense, alongside its use in the newer senses.

Palaeos.com described his writing style as follows:

Prof. Cavalier-Smith of Oxford University has produced a large body of work which is well regarded. Still, he is controversial in a way that is a bit difficult to describe. The issue may be one of writing style. Cavalier-Smith has a tendency to make pronouncements where others would use declarative sentences, to use declarative sentences where others would express an opinion, and to express opinions where angels would fear to tread. In addition, he can sound arrogant, reactionary, and even perverse. On the other [hand], he has a long history of being right when everyone else was wrong. To our way of thinking, all of this is overshadowed by one incomparable virtue: the fact that he will grapple with the details. This makes for very long, very complex papers and causes all manner of dark murmuring, tearing of hair, and gnashing of teeth among those tasked with trying to explain his views of early life. See, [for example], Zrzavý (2001) [and] Patterson (1999). Nevertheless, he deals with all of the relevant facts.

== Cavalier-Smith's contributions ==
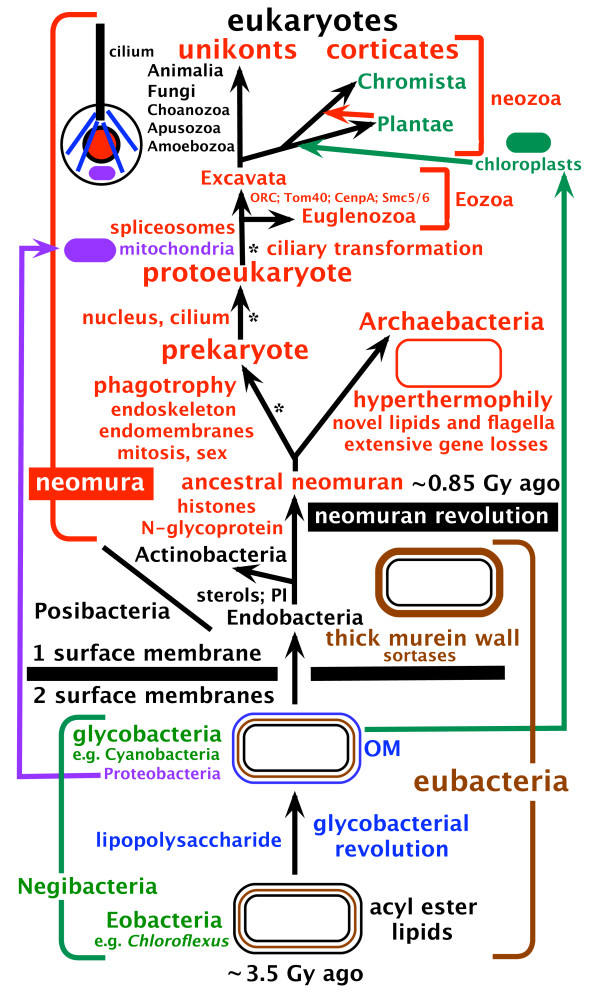
Tree of life and major steps in cell evolution after Cavalier-Smith, c. 2010, before his 2015 revision.

Cavalier-Smith wrote extensively on the taxonomy and classification of all life forms, but especially protists. One of his major contributions to biology was his proposal of a new kingdom of life: the Chromista, even though it is not widely accepted to be monophyletic (see above).

He also introduced new taxonomic groupings group for eukaryotes such as the Chromalveolata (1981), Opisthokonta (1987), Rhizaria (2002), and Excavata (2002). Though well known, many of his claims have been controversial and have not gained widespread acceptance in the scientific community. His taxonomic revisions often influenced the overall classification of all life forms.

=== Eight kingdoms model ===
Cavalier-Smith's first major classification system was the division of all organisms into eight kingdoms. In 1981, he proposed that by completely revising Robert Whittaker's Five Kingdom system, there could be eight kingdoms: Bacteria, Eufungi, Ciliofungi, Animalia, Biliphyta, Viridiplantae, Cryptophyta, and Euglenozoa.

In 1983, he revised his system particularly in the light of growing evidence that Archaebacteria were a separate group from Bacteria, to include an array of lineages that had been excluded from his 1981 treatment, to deal with issues of polyphyly, and to promote new ideas of relationships. In addition, some protists lacking mitochondria were discovered. As mitochondria were known to be the result of the endosymbiosis of a proteobacterium, it was thought that these amitochondriate eukaryotes were primitively so, marking an important step in eukaryogenesis. As a result, these amitochondriate protists were given special status as a protozoan subkingdom Archezoa, that he later elevated to kingdom status. This was later referred to as the Archezoa hypothesis. In 1993, the eight kingdoms became: Eubacteria, Archaebacteria, Archezoa, Protozoa, Chromista, Plantae, Fungi, and Animalia.

The kingdom Archezoa went through many compositional changes due to evidence of polyphyly and paraphyly before being abandoned. He assigned some former members of the kingdom Archezoa to the phylum Amoebozoa.

=== Six kingdoms models ===
By 1998, Cavalier-Smith had reduced the total number of kingdoms from eight to six: Animalia, Protozoa, Fungi, Plantae (including Glaucophyte, red and green algae), Chromista, and Bacteria. Nevertheless, he had already presented this simplified scheme for the first time on his 1981 paper and endorsed it in 1983.

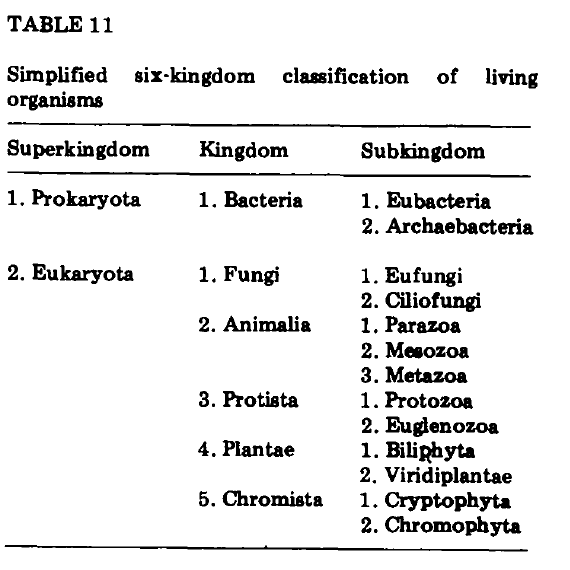
Table 11 From Eukaryote kingdoms: seven or nine?

Five of Cavalier-Smith's kingdoms are classified as eukaryotes as shown in the following scheme:

- Eubacteria
- Neomura
  - Archaebacteria
  - Eukaryotes
    - Kingdom Protozoa
    - Unikonts (heterotrophs)
      - Kingdom Animalia
      - Kingdom Fungi
    - Bikonts (primarily photosynthetic)
      - Kingdom Plantae (including red and green algae)
      - Kingdom Chromista

The kingdom Animalia was divided into four subkingdoms: Radiata (phyla Porifera, Cnidaria, Placozoa, and Ctenophora), Myxozoa, Mesozoa, and Bilateria (all other animal phyla).

He created three new animal phyla: Acanthognatha (rotifers, acanthocephalans, gastrotrichs, and gnathostomulids), Brachiozoa (brachiopods and phoronids), and Lobopoda (onychophorans and tardigrades) and recognised a total of 23 animal phyla.

Cavalier-Smith's 2003 classification scheme:

- Unikonts
  - protozoan phylum Amoebozoa (ancestrally uniciliate)
  - opisthokonts
    - uniciliate protozoan phylum Choanozoa
    - kingdom Fungi
    - kingdom Animalia
- Bikonts
  - protozoan infrakingdom Rhizaria
    - phylum Cercozoa
    - phylum Retaria (Radiozoa and Foraminifera)
  - protozoan infrakingdom Excavata
    - phylum Loukozoa
    - phylum Metamonada
    - phylum Euglenozoa
    - phylum Percolozoa
  - protozoan phylum Apusozoa (Thecomonadea and Diphylleida)
  - the chromalveolate clade
    - kingdom Chromista (Cryptista, Heterokonta, and Haptophyta)
    - protozoan infrakingdom Alveolata
      - phylum Ciliophora
      - phylum Miozoa (Protalveolata, Dinozoa, and Apicomplexa)
  - kingdom Plantae (Viridaeplantae, Rhodophyta and Glaucophyta)

=== Seven kingdoms model ===
Cavalier-Smith and his collaborators revised the classification in 2015, and published it in PLOS ONE. In this scheme they reintroduced the division of prokaryotes into two kingdoms, Bacteria (previously 'Eubacteria') and Archaea (previously 'Archebacteria'). This is based on the consensus in the Taxonomic Outline of Bacteria and Archaea (TOBA) and the Catalogue of Life.

=== Proposed root of the tree of life ===
In 2006, Cavalier-Smith proposed that the last universal common ancestor to all life was a non-flagellate Gram-negative bacterium ("negibacterium") with two membranes (also known as diderm bacterium).

== Awards and honours ==
Cavalier-Smith was elected Fellow of the Linnean Society of London (FLS) in 1980, the Institute of Biology (FIBiol) in 1983, the Royal Society of Arts (FRSA) in 1987, the Canadian Institute for Advanced Research (CIFAR) in 1988, the Royal Society of Canada (FRSC) in 1997, and the Royal Society of London (FRS) in 1998.

He received the International Prize for Biology from the Emperor of Japan in 2004, and the Linnean Medal for Zoology in 2007. He was appointed Fellow of the Canadian Institute for Advanced Research (CIFAR) between 1998 and 2007, and Advisor of the Integrated Microbial Biodiversity of CIFAR. He won the 2007 Frink Medal of the Zoological Society of London.
