= Xenodasyidae =

Scientific classification
- Kingdom: Animalia
- Phylum: Gastrotricha
- Order: Macrodasyida
- Family: Xenodasyidae; Todaro, Guidi, Leasi & Tongiorgi, 2006

Family of gastrotrichs

Xenodasyidae is a family of gastrotrichs belonging to the order Macrodasyida.

Genera:

- Chordodasiopsis Todaro, Guidi, Leasi & Tongiorgi, 2006
- Xenodasys Swedmark, 1967
