= Catch connective tissue =

Kind of connective tissue in echinoderms

Catch connective tissue (also called mutable collagenous tissue) is a kind of connective tissue found in echinoderms (such as starfish and sea cucumbers) which can change its mechanical properties in a few seconds or minutes through nervous control rather than by muscular means.

Connective tissue, including dermis, tendons and ligaments, is one of four main animal tissues. Usual connective tissue does not change its stiffness except in the slow process of aging. Catch connective tissue, however, shows rapid, large and reversible stiffness changes in response to stimulation under nervous control. This connective tissue is specific to echinoderms in which it works in posture maintenance and mechanical defense with low energy expenditure, and in body fission and autotomy. The stiffness changes of this tissue are due to the changes in the stiffness of extracellular materials. The small amount of muscle cells that are sometimes found scattered in this tissue has little influence on the stiffness-change mechanisms.

== Tissue distribution ==
Catch connective tissue is found in all the extant classes of echinoderms.

- Sea lilies and feather stars: ligaments connecting ossicles of arms, stalks and cirri.
- Starfish: body-wall dermis; walls of tube feet.
- Brittle stars: intervertebral ligaments; autotomy tendons of arm muscles.
- Sea urchins: ligaments or catch apparatus, connecting spines to tests of sea urchins; tooth ligaments; compass depressor "muscles", which are in fact mostly made of connective tissues.
- Sea cucumbers: body-wall dermis.

Early echinoderms were sessile organisms that fed on suspended particles carried by water currents. Their body was covered with imbricate small skeletal plates. The arrangement of plates suggests that plates worked as sliding joints so as animals to be able to change their body shape: they could possibly take an extended feeding posture and a flat "hiding" posture. The body plates might be connected with catch connective tissue that allowed early echinoderms such postural changes.

== Mechanism of stiffness changes ==
Detailed mechanical properties and their changes have been studied only in sea-cucumber dermis. Its mechanical properties are determined by the extracellular materials that are made of collagen fibrils embedded in a hydrogel of proteoglycans. The dermis takes three mechanical states: soft (S1), standard (S2) and stiff (S3). Animals without stimulation takes the standard state S2. Different molecular mechanisms of stiffening have been found in the transition S1→S2 and in the transition S2→S3. Three proteins that cause stiffness changes have been isolated from sea cucumbers. Tensilin causes the change S1→S2 increasing cohesive forces between collagens, whereas softening causes the change in the reverse direction; NSF induces S2→S3. There are cross bridges between collagen fibrils. The number of bridges increases in the order S1<S2<S3.

== Nervous control ==
The mechanical states of catch connective tissue are under nervous control and thus we can regard this tissue as one of neurally controlled mechano-effectors such as muscles. It is found in the sea-urchin spine joints that the stiffness of catch connective tissue changes in the coordinated manner with the muscle contractions. One of the characteristic cells found in catch connective tissue is juxtaligamental cells containing secretory granules. These cells are supposed to contain proteins controlling stiffness of extracellular materials. When stained with the antibody specific to echinoderm nerves sea-cucumber body wall is supplied with immunoreactive fine fibers running among the collagen fibrils. Pharmacological experiments suggested the presence of two types of cholinergic systems, one is the nicotinic one involved in the dermal stiffening and the other is the muscarinic one involved in softening. Cholinergic nerves seem to control the secretory activities of juxtaligamental cells. The presence of the cholinergic system was supported by the neuropeptide stichopin that inhibits the action of stiffening cholinergic systems. Stichopin is one of four new peptides in the dermis of sea cucumbers. Other ones are the neuropeptide NGIWYamide that stiffens the dermis and two holokinins that soften the dermis. The nerves containing these neuropeptides possibly control the secretory activities of juxtaligamental cells.
