= Palaeos =

Website Focuses on Science

Palaeos.com is a web site on biology, paleontology, phylogeny and geology and which covers the history of Earth. The site is well respected and has been used as a reference by professional paleontologists such as Michael J. Benton, the professor of vertebrate palaeontology in the Department of Earth Sciences at the University of Bristol. It is frequently cited in Science Online.

Palaeos.com was started by Toby White and Alan Kazlev; the pair were later joined by Chris Taylor, Mikko Haaramo of the Department of Geology at the University of Helsinki, and Chris Clowes. It features professional-level, yet readable articles about:

- Palaeontology, evolution and systematics
- Geochronology, earth systems and time scale
- Diversity of life and ecology

The site's developers have started a wiki, Palaeos.org, which uses MediaWiki software to provide conventional voluntary membership.

Some pages use images from websites run by David Peters, whose works sometimes considered as highly unreliable.
