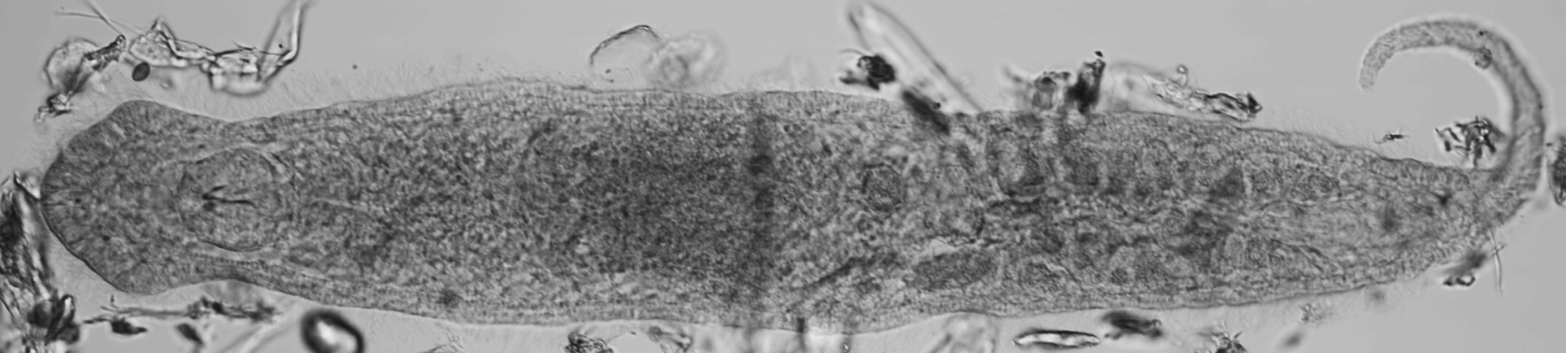
- Gnathostomula paradoxa

Scientific classification
- Kingdom: Animalia
- Subkingdom: Eumetazoa
- Clade: ParaHoxozoa
- Clade: Bilateria
- Clade: Nephrozoa
- Clade: Protostomia
- Clade: Spiralia
- Clade: Gnathifera
- Phylum: Gnathostomulida; Ax, 1956

Orders and suborders
- Filospermoidea; Bursovaginoidea; Conophoralia; Scleroperalia

= Gnathostomulid =

Jaw worms

Phylum of marine invertebrates

Gnathostomulids, or jaw worms, are a small phylum of nearly microscopic marine animals. They inhabit sand and mud beneath shallow coastal waters and can survive in relatively anoxic environments. They were first recognised and described in 1956.

== Anatomy ==
Most gnathostomulids measure 0.5 to 1 millimetre (0.02 to 0.04 in) in length. They are often slender to thread-like worms, with a generally transparent body. In many Bursovaginoidea, one of the major group of gnathostomulids, the neck region is slightly narrower than the rest of the body, giving them a distinct head.

Like flatworms they have a ciliated epidermis, but in contrast to flatworms, they have one cilium per cell. The cilia allow the worms to glide along in the water between sand grains, although they also use muscles, allowing the body to twist or contract, for movement.

They have no body cavity, and no circulatory or respiratory system. The nervous system is simple, and restricted to the outer layers of the body wall. The only sense organs are modified cilia, which are especially common in the head region.

The mouth is located just behind the head, after a rostrum, on the underside of the body. It has a pair of cuticular jaws, supplied by strong muscles, and often bearing minute teeth. A "basal plate" on the lower surface that bears a comb-like structure is also present. The basal plate is used to scrape smaller organisms off of the grains of sand that make up their anoxic seabed mud habitat. This bilaterally symmetrical pharynx with its complex cuticular mouth parts make them appear closely related to rotifers and their allies, together making up the Gnathifera. The ultrastructure of the jaws made of rods with electron dense core in transmission electron microscopy sections also support their close relation with Rotifera and Micrognathozoa. Jaws are absent in the two species making up the small genus Agnathiella (family Agnathiellidae). The mouth of gnathostomulids opens into a blind-ending tube in which digestion takes place; there is no true anus. However, there is tissue connecting the intestine to the epidermis which may serve as an anal pore.

== Reproduction ==
Gnathostomulids are simultaneous hermaphrodites. Each individual possesses a single ovary and one or two testes. After fertilization, the single egg ruptures through the body wall and adheres to nearby sand particles; the parent is able to rapidly heal the resulting wound. The egg hatches into a miniature version of the adult, without a larval stage.

== Taxonomy ==
There are approximately 100 described species and certainly many more as yet undescribed. The known species are grouped in two orders. The filospermoids are very long and are characterized by an elongate rostrum. The bursovaginoids have paired sensory organs and are characterized by the presence of a penis and a sperm-storage organ called a bursa.

Gnathostomulids have no known fossil record, though there are (debatable) similarities between the jaws of modern gnathostomulids and certain conodont elements. (Ochietti & Cailleux, 1969; Durden et al, 1969)

They appear to be a sister clade to the Syndermata.
