= Pre-cell =

Hypothetical life before complete cells

The terms pre-cell (precell), proto-cell (protocell), etc. are frequently used to designate hypothetical ancestral entities precursing complete cells. The meanings of these terms vary with the different hypotheses for the early evolution of life and, accordingly, with the corresponding publications.

There are different hypotheses attempting to explain the origin of the three domains of life (Woese et al. 1990) from a last universal common ancestor (LUCA). The nature of this ancestral entity remains a major subject of discussion.

Under the RNA world hypothesis (replication-first scenario), over a precellular and early-cellular phase, the earliest self-replicating biological systems were based on catalytic RNA evolving stage by stage to a nearly complete ancestral cell, the last universal common ancestor (LUCA) from which the three domains of life emerged.

This ancestral cell (sometimes also called pre-cell or proto-cell), a hypothetical lipid-based structure, could have confined RNA in ancient times. This structure allowed the RNA to remain in close proximity with other RNA molecules, keeping them concentrated and allowing for an increased reaction rate of enzymes. It would have had semi-permeable membranes, allowing only certain molecules to pass through. These enclosed structures may have facilitated natural selection in RNA molecules.

Under the pre-cell theory (Kandler 1994ff), based on the Iron-Sulfur world hypothesis (metabolism-first scenario), primordial metabolism led to the early diversification of life through the evolution of a multiphenotypical population of pre-cells, defined by Kandler as metabolizing, replicating loose entities exhibiting many of the basic properties of a cell but no proper cytoplasmic membrane and no stable chromosome, thus allowing frequent mutual exchange of genetic information.

Early diversification of life with Kandler's pre-cell theory (Kandler 1998, p. 22)

From this pre-cell population the three founder groups A, B, C and then, from them, the precursor cells (here named proto-cells) of the three domains of life emerged successively, leading first to the domain Bacteria, then to the domain Archea, and finally to the domain Eukarya.

Thus, under this scenario there was no almost complete ancestral “first cell“ or cell stage. Instead, the three domains originated from a population of evolving pre-cells. The emergence of cells was a process of successive evolutionary improvements, for which Kandler introduced the term cellularization.

A scheme of the pre-cell scenario is presented in the adjacent figure, where essential evolutionary improvements are indicated by numbers:

"(1) Reductive formation of organic compounds from CO or CO2 by Me-sulfur coordinative chemistry; (2) tapping of various redox energy sources and formation of primitive enzymes and templates; (3) elements of a transcription and translation apparatus and loose associations; (4) formation of pre-cells; (5) stabilized circular or linear genomes; (6) cytoplasmic membranes; (7) rigid murein cell walls; (8) various non-murein rigid cell walls; (9) glycoproteinaceous cell envelope or glycokalyx; (10) cytoskeleton; (11) complex chromosomes and nuclear membrane; (12) cell organelles via endosymbiosis".^{: 22}

This scenario may explain the quasi-random distribution of evolutionarily important features among the three domains and, at the same time, the existence of the most basic biochemical features (genetic code, set of protein amino acids etc.) in all three domains (unity of life), as well as the close relationship between the Archaea and the Eukarya.

Kandler's pre-cell theory is supported by Wächtershäuser. According to Wächtershäuser, pre-cells had a membrane composed of mixed-enantiomer lipid molecules. As natural selection proceeded, pre-cells may have developed stereospecific lipid membranes through frequent fission and fusion of racemic pre-cells.

== See also ==
- First universal common ancestor
