= Otto Kandler =

German botanist (1920–2017)

Otto Kandler (23 October 1920 in Deggendorf – 29 August 2017 in Munich, Bavaria) was a German botanist and microbiologist. Until his retirement in 1986 he was professor of botany at the Ludwig-Maximilians-Universität München (LMU).

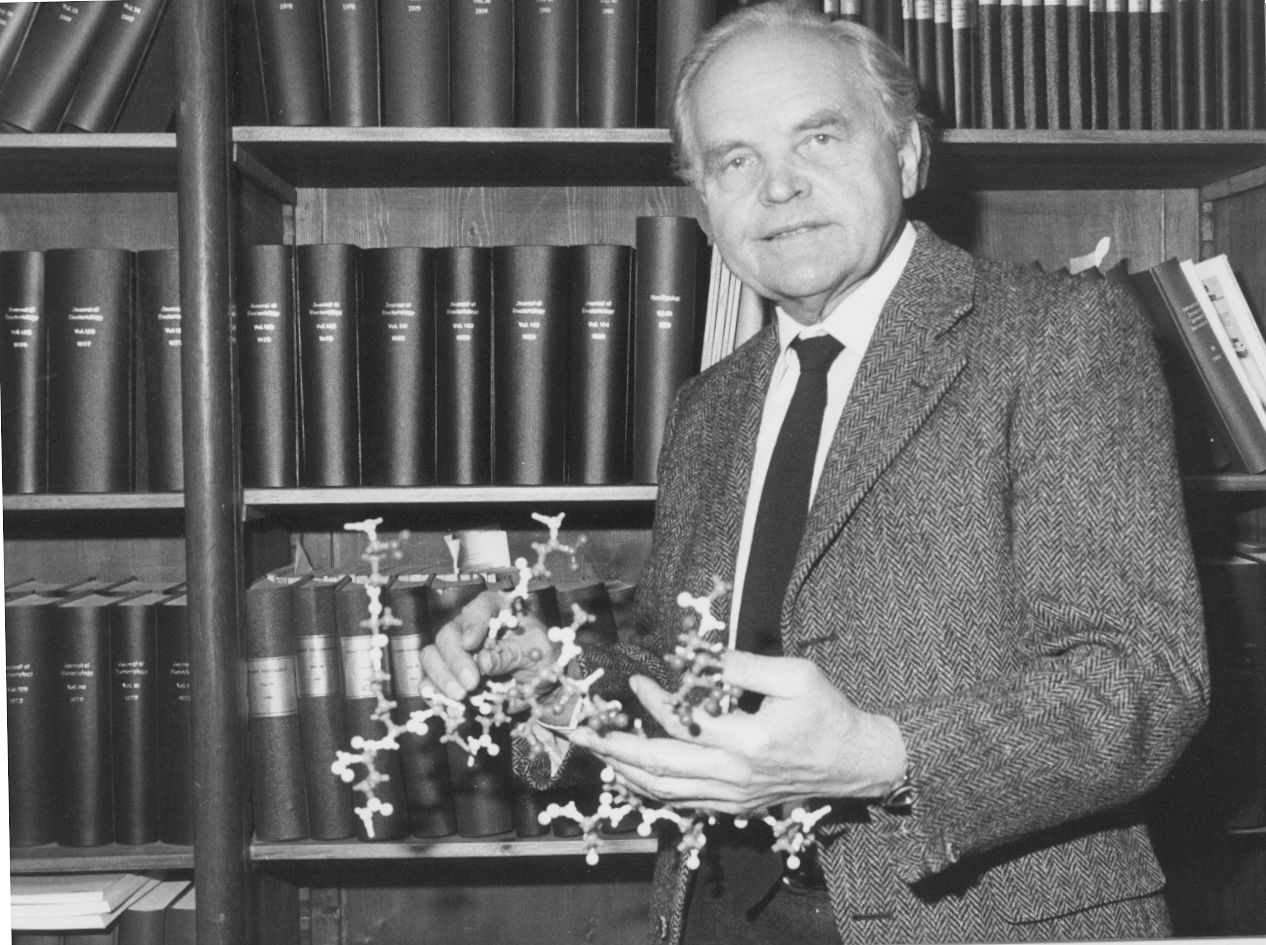
Otto Kandler in 1983, with a molecular model of pseudomurein (pseudopeptidoglycan)

His most important research topics were photosynthesis, plant carbohydrate metabolism, analysis of the structure of bacterial cell walls (murein/peptidoglycan), the systematics of Lactobacillus, and the chemotaxonomy of plants and microorganisms. He presented the first experimental evidence for the existence of photophosphorylation in vivo. His discovery of the basic differences between the cell walls of bacteria and archaea (up to 1990 called "archaebacteria") convinced him that archaea represent an autonomous group of organisms distinct from bacteria. This was the basis for his cooperation with Carl Woese and made him the founder of research on the Archaea in Germany. In 1990, together with Woese, he proposed the three domains of life: Bacteria, Archaea, Eucarya. Finally, on the basis of his lifelong interest in the early evolution and diversification of life on this planet, Kandler presented his pre-cell theory, suggesting that the three domains of life did not emerge from an ancestral cell, e.g. the last universal common ancestor (LUCA), but from a population of pre-cells.

== Life and education ==
Otto Kandler was born on 23 October 1920 in Deggendorf, Bavaria, as the 6th child of the family of a market gardener. Growing up and helping in his father's garden, early on, he became interested in plant life and nature in general. He attended school for 8 years. When he was about twelve years old he had read about Charles Darwin and mentioned it to a Catholic priest. The priest punished him with two strikes on his hands with a rod. However he remained interested in the origin and evolution of organisms for the rest of his life.

His parents could not afford to pay the fees for the gymnasium, and he was supposed to become a gardener or learn another trade. However his teachers convinced his parents that their talented son should continue school. So he attended the "Deutsche Aufbauschule" in Straubing, Bavaria, a school for the education of future teachers. His studies were, however, interrupted by the Second World War. In 1939 he and his fellow students had to join the Reichsarbeitsdienst, later he had to serve in the German army as a radio reporter in Russia. At the end of the war his group was transferred to Austria. He escaped by bicycle to the Western Front to avoid capture by the Russians. After spending a few months in an American prison camp he was allowed to return home. Between 1945 and 1946 he reconstructed his father's market garden and earned some money by growing and selling vegetable, especially cabbage, and flowers to finance his life and his future studies.

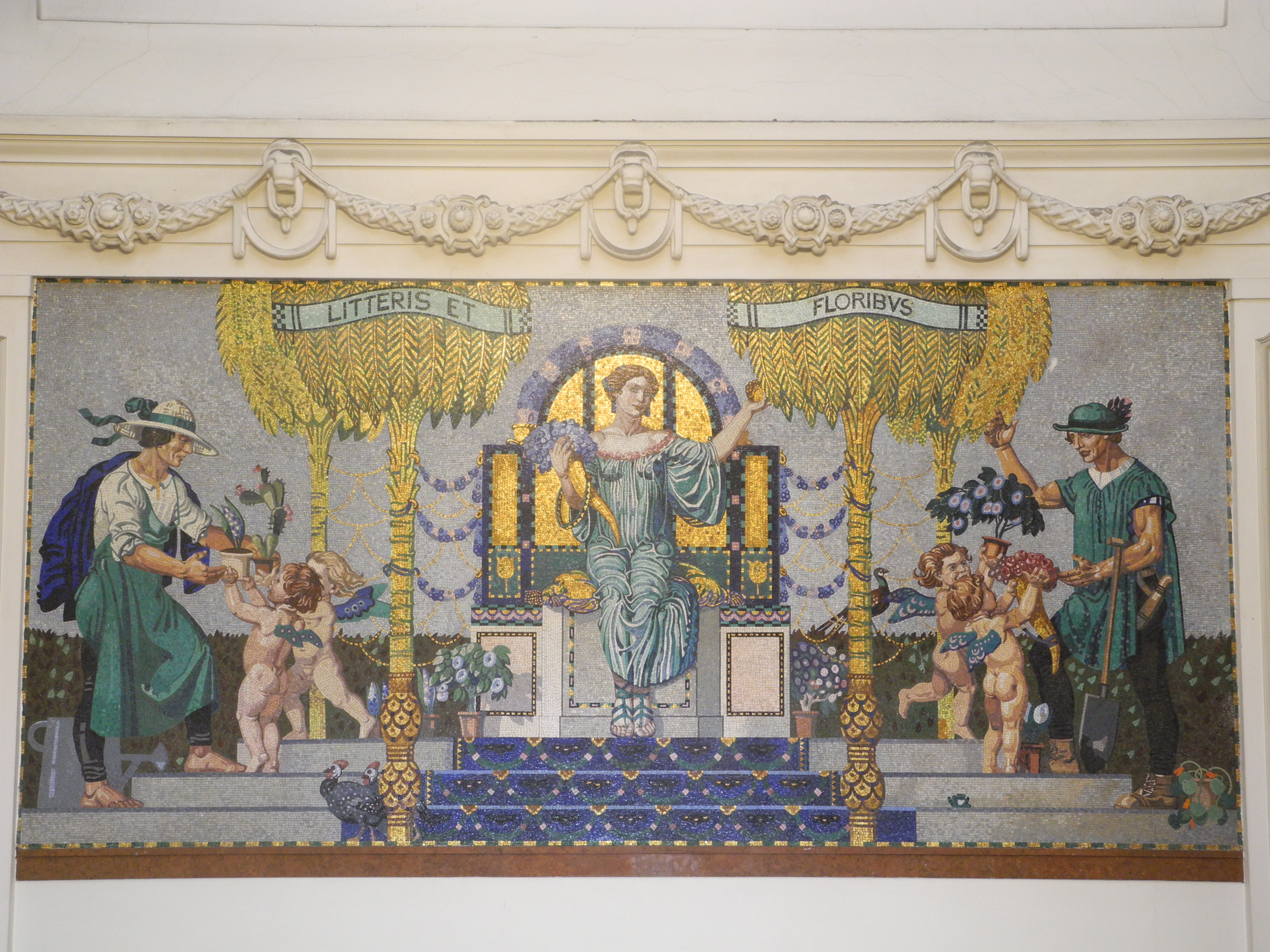
Wall mosaic in the great entrance hall of the historical building of the Botanical Institute, Ludwig-Maximilians-Universität München

Kandler was very interested in science, but only in 1946 was he able to enroll at Ludwig-Maximilians-Universität München (LMU) in botany, zoology, geology, chemistry and physics. He also attended philosophy lectures. Since much of the Ludwig-Maximilians-Universität München had been bombed, the institute buildings were badly damaged and still in ruins. To be admitted, he and all the other students had to remove rubble and help reconstruct buildings. After three terms he found a research subject for his dissertation in botany. As the first in Germany he started to cultivate isolated plant tissues in vitro. He used these tissue cultures to study for instance metabolism and the influence of auxins under defined in vitro conditions, received his doctor's degree with honors in 1949 and became assistant professor of botany at the LMU. After his habilitation in 1953 he remained at the university until 1957. In 1953 he married Gertraud Schäfer, a graduate student of microbiology. They have three daughters and four grandchildren. For his early publications on photophosphorylation he received a generous research fellowship from the Rockefeller Foundation and, in 1956/1957 he was able to work on basic questions of photosynthesis for one year in the USA.

After his return, Kandler was dissatisfied with the poor laboratory conditions at the university at home, so he was glad to find a position as director of the Bacteriological Institute of the South German Dairy Research Center in Freising-Weihenstephan in 1957, where conditions were much better. In 1960 he was appointed full professor of Applied Botany of the Technical University of Munich, where research conditions still at that time were bad. So he kept his position in Weihenstephan in parallel until 1965. In 1968 he was appointed full professor and Head of the Department of Botany at the LMU, taught and conducted research until his retirement in 1986. His broad scientific interests are indicated by the titles of his more than 400 publications. His scientific legacy was handed over to the university archive of the LMU.

Kandler would have celebrated his 100th birthday on 23 October 2020. For this centenary Kandler's family gave his chronological collection of historical botany books, among them herbals of the 16th and 17th centuries, as a present to the library of the "Regensburgische Botanische Gesellschaft" (founded by David Heinrich Hoppe in 1790), which has been included in the library of the University of Regensburg. Through digitization these historical sources will be generally accessible.

As a further donation, the painting "Boy with Soap Bubble" (homo bulla) by Bartholomaeus Bruyn the Elder went to the Germanisches Nationalmuseum in Nuremberg. The classic Vanitas symbol ("man is like a soap bubble") as an allegory for the extreme fragility and transience of life had always fascinated Otto Kandler, a lover and connoisseur of Renaissance painting.

== Plant physiology ==
Otto Kandler was very interested in plant growth processes, photosynthesis, metabolism, especially of carbohydrates. As the first in Germany he started to grow isolated plant tissue cultures (e.g. of stems, roots, sprouts, embryos, callus growths) in vitro to study metabolism and the effect of auxins under defined in vitro conditions. As mentioned above, this formed the subject of his dissertation (summa cum laude) in 1949.

In his contribution „Historical perspectives on queries concerning photophosphorylation" Kandler describes the beginnings of photophosphorylation research and how he became interested: In 1948, he was inspired by a lecture on the phosphate metabolism of yeast by Feodor Lynen (1964 Nobel Prize in Physiology or Medicine). In these years, in the aftermath of World War II, the original Chemical Institute of the Ludwig-Maximilians-Universität München (LMU) was still in ruins and Feodor Lynen and his assistant Helmut Holzer were working temporarily as guests in the Botanical Institute just next door to the laboratory where Kandler was engaged in his thesis in botany. Kandler was impressed by the experimental methods in Lynen's laboratory and got acquainted with them; Holzer and Kandler became close friends. At that time, Holzer was able to present the first evidence for ATP formation in yeast oxidizing butanol to butyric acid. Kandler then decided to transfer their techniques for measuring phosphorylation rates in vivo to photosynthesis studies in Chlorella.

So, in 1950, he was the first to present experimental evidence for the light-dependent formation of ATP (photophosphorylation) in vivo in intact Chlorella cells. In 1954, Daniel I. Arnon discovered photophosphorylation in vitro using isolated chloroplasts and mentioned Kandler's pioneering work. Kandler's early publications on light-dependent formation of ATP led the Rockefeller Foundation to offer him a one-year research fellowship in the USA. So in 1956–1957 he worked for 6 months with Martin Gibbs at the Brookhaven National Laboratory and then for another 6 months with Melvin Calvin (1961 Nobel Prize in Chemistry) at the University of California, Berkeley on central questions of photosynthesis (e.g. the path of carbon in photosynthesis, today called the Calvin-Benson-Bassham Cycle).

The method of radioactive labelling, i.e. the use of radioactive isotopes for tracing the path of e.g. carbon in photosynthesis, was brought to Germany by Kandler.

Together with his coworkers, Kandler demonstrated the occurrence of ADP-glucose, the glucose donor of starch biosynthesis, for the first time in plants. He made an essential contribution to clarify the complicated biosynthesis of branched-chain monosaccharides (hamamelose, apiose). Finally he elucidated the biosynthesis of the sugars of the raffinose family, the most frequent oligosaccharides in plants. As a result of these findings, the function of galactinol, a galactoside of inositol, as a galactosyl donor, was elucidated, and hence the role of inositol as a co-factor of sugar transfer reactions in plants.

== Microbiology ==
In addition to his interest in plant physiology and biochemistry Otto Kandler early on focused on bacteria, above all, on the presence or absence of their cell walls, since, in the early 1950s, such wall-less microorganisms were often regarded as representatives of "urbacteria". Together with his wife, he investigated the so-called PPLOs, (now mycoplasms), wall-less penicillin-resistant bacteria, and L-form bacteria (bacteria that lost their cell walls). They found that these organisms do not proliferate by binary fission but by a budding process. These publications are still cited at present.

During his time as director of the Bacteriological Institute of the South German Dairy Research Center in Freising-Weihenstephan, Kandler concentrated on dairy microbiology and investigated the physiology, biochemistry and systematics of lactobacilli, on which he wrote a chapter in Bergey's Manual, the ‘bible' of microbiologists. In addition he published numerous papers on the isolation, description and taxonomy of other bacteria.

Kandler was one of the first scientists who, together with his group, studied the chemistry and structure of the cell walls of bacteria. The primary structure of peptidoglycan (murein), the unique cell wall component of bacteria, was investigated. Kandler recognized that the amino acid sequence of peptidoglycan is a valuable chemotaxonomic marker. The different peptidoglycan types and their taxonomic implications were described in detail by Schleifer and Kandler. As a result, they suggested comparative cell wall chemistry as a marker for the deep branches in the phylogenetic tree of bacteria. Kandler’s cell wall studies also included methanogenic "bacteria" (methanogens) and halophilic "bacteria" (halophiles).

In October 1976 Kandler discovered that two strains of the methanogen Methanosarcina barkeri did not contain peptidoglycan. Consequently, he came to the conclusion that methanogens are basically different from bacteria. In his group, also "halobacteria" were found to lack peptidoglycan, confirming the idea, that also these organisms are not bacteria and belong to a group of organisms soon called "archaebacteria" (in 1990 classified as archaea). In some "archaebacteria" Kandler and König identified pseudomurein, now also called pseudopeptidoglycan, a novel cell wall component, and elucidated its structure and biosynthesis.

The methanogen Methanopyrus kandleri was named in honor of Kandler by Karl O. Stetter as a present for Kandler's 70th birthday.

Together with Hans Günter Schlegel, Kandler was substantially involved in the foundation of the German collection of microorganisms and cell cultures (DSMZ) in Braunschweig.

Kandler was the founder and editor of Systematic and Applied Microbiology, co-editor of the Archives of Microbiology and of Zeitschrift für Pflanzenphysiologie.

== Archaea and the three domains of life ==
Otto Kandler's main subject in microbiology was his research on archaea (before 1990 called "archaebacteria"). His discovery (October 1976) that peptidoglycan (murein), a typical cell wall component of bacteria, is missing in two strains of methanogenic "bacteria" (methanogens) became one of the first three pieces of evidence that methanogens belong to a group of organisms distinct from bacteria. Therefore, Kandler was delighted when he learned from a letter by Ralph F. Wolfe, expert on methanogens, on 11 November 1976, that Wolfe's colleague Carl Woese (University of Illinois, Urbana, USA) had just discovered basic differences between methanogens and bacteria with his novel 16S ribosomal RNA gene sequencing method. When Kandler received this letter, based on his new findings, he had already planned to investigate the cell walls of other methanogens together with Marvin P. Bryant, also an expert on methanogens from the University of Illinois. Coincidentally, Bryant was just sitting in Kandler's office when Wolfe's letter arrived. In his letter Wolfe also offered to send cultures for cell wall studies since he knew Kandler was a cell wall expert. Kandler wrote back immediately how impressed he was with Woese's findings and ideas and that he looked forward to investigate Wolfe's methanogens. In his reply Kandler also mentioned that methanogens and halophiles may be "ancient relics" that have branched off from the bulk of the prokaryotes before peptidoglycan had been "invented". He asked Wolfe to send him lyophilized cells of methanogens to analyse their cell walls.

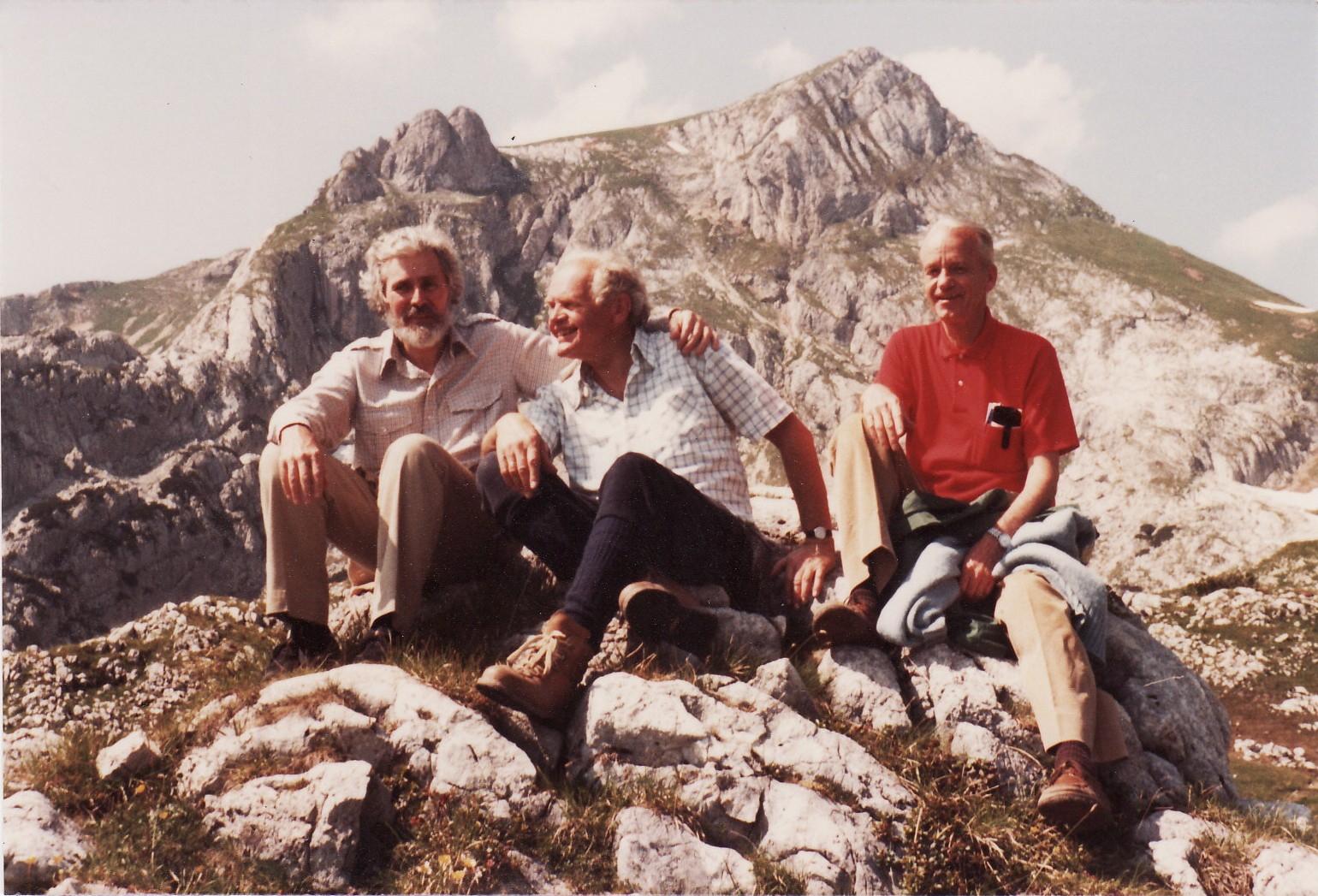
Carl Woese (left), Otto Kandler and Ralph Wolfe on their way to Mt. Hochiss in 1981 (photo by Gertraud Kandler)

In January 1977, Kandler visited Woese for the first time. He was immediately convinced of Woese's new concept, for his cell wall analyses matched perfectly with Woese's 16S rRNA sequencing results. This was the beginning of a close and productive transatlantic complementary relationship and cooperation by the exchange of cultures, results and ideas. Kandler's group studied the cell wall composition and Woese's group the 16S rRNA gene sequences. In their fundamental frequently cited publication, Woese and Fox (November 1977) introduced the term "archaebacteria", at that time, comprising only methanogens. They cited Kandler and named the very first three pieces of evidence for the concept of the "archaebacteria":

1. lack of peptidoglycan in methanogens (Kandler)
2. two unusual coenzymes in methanogens (Wolfe)
3. unique rRNA sequences in methanogens (Woese).

In this article Woese and Fox also still used a preliminary terminology ("domains" for the two groups prokaryotes and eukaryotes; "primary kingdoms" or "urkingdoms" for the three groupings "eubacteria", "archaebacteria", and "urkaryotes". Only in 1990, in their publication on the phylogenetic tree of life, Woese and Kandler proposed the term "domain" for the three groups Bacteria, Archaea, Eucarya, see below).

While Woese's proposal to subdivide organisms into "three lines of descent" at that time received little support – and even harsh criticism – in the US, Kandler called Woese "the Darwin of the 20th century" and was convinced that research on "archaebacteria" had a great future.

With great enthusiasm Kandler founded research on "archaebacteria" in Germany and organised funding for this novel field. In the spring of 1978, in Munich, Kandler organised the very first meeting on "archaebacteria". Carl Woese was invited, but was not able to participate.

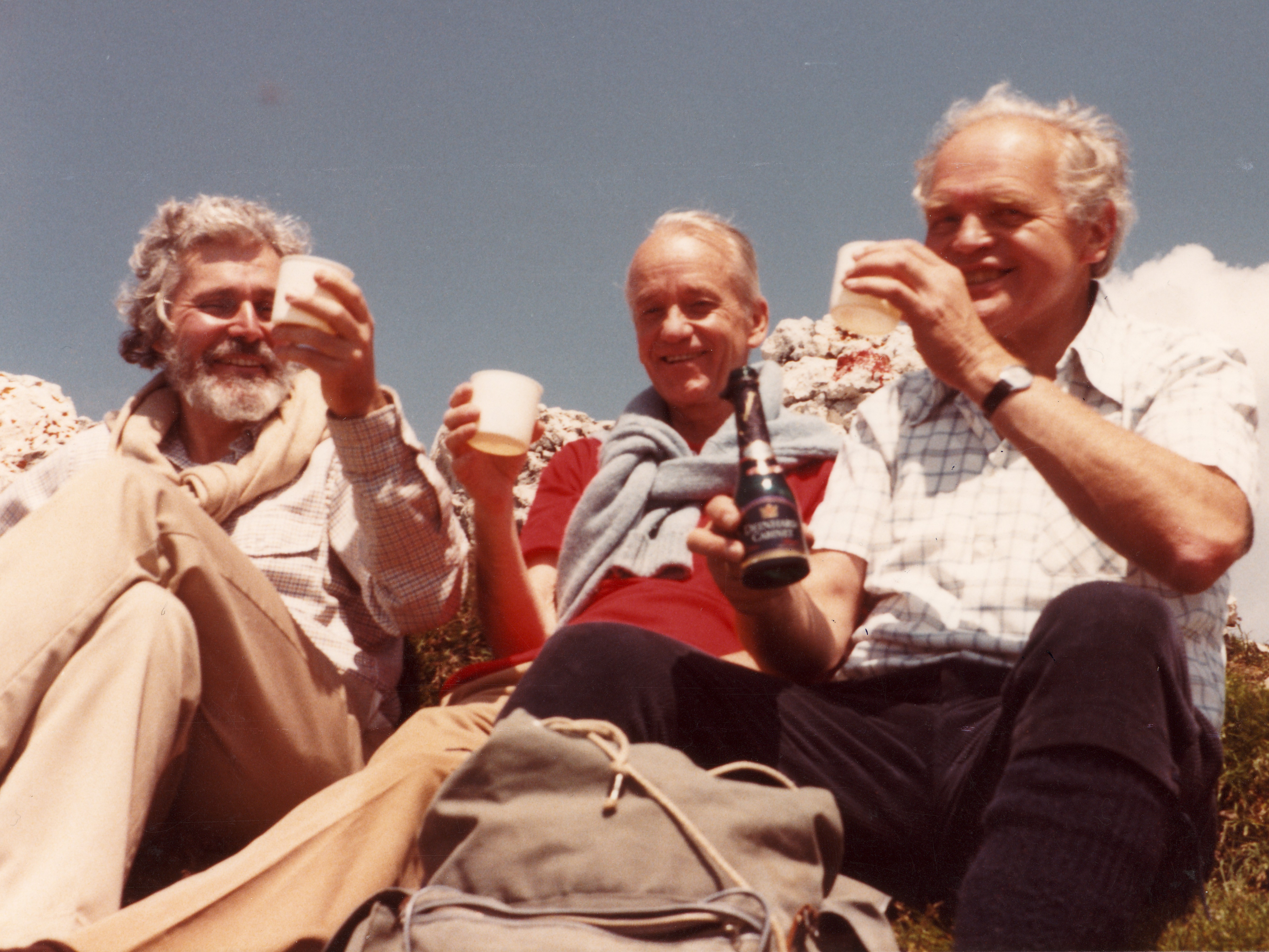
Carl Woese (left), Ralph Wolfe and Otto Kandler (right), celebrating the "archaebacteria" (now archaea) on top of Mt. Hochiss in 1981 (photo by Gertraud Kandler)

In the summer of 1979, Kandler invited Woese again to give a lecture at a meeting of the "Deutsche Gesellschaft für Mikrobiologie und Hygiene" in Munich. This time Woese participated. He came to Munich for the first time and was welcomed with fanfare, a brass band concert and a dinner party in the great entrance hall of the Botanical Institute of the Ludwig-Maximilians-Universität München (photo see "Life and education").

The first international conference ever on "archaebacteria" was also organised by Kandler, again in Munich, in 1981. Both, Carl Woese and Ralph Wolfe took part. The resulting conference volume was the very first book on "archaebacteria". At this conference convincing evidence for essential structural, biochemical and molecular differences between bacteria and "archaebacteria" was presented leading to the gradual acceptance of the concept of the "archaebacteria" as an autonomous group of organisms. After the conference, the "archaebacteria" were celebrated by Woese, Wolfe and Kandler on an excursion to the close Alps climbing the top of Hochiss (2299 m) in the Rofan mountains (see Photos).

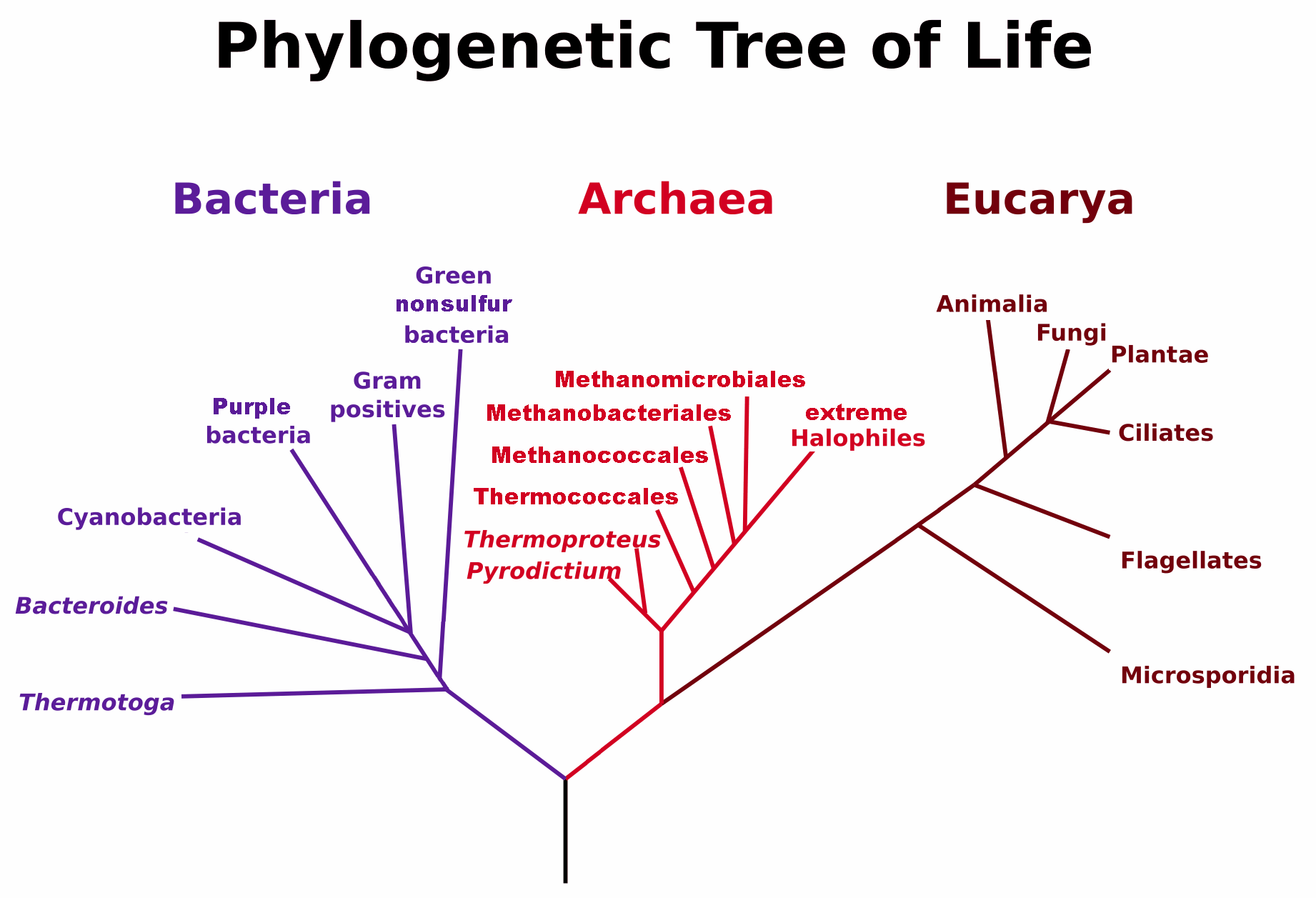
Universal phylogenetic tree in rooted form, showing the three domains (Woese, Kandler, Wheelis 1990, p. 4578)

In 1985, Kandler and Zillig organised a second international conference on "archaebacteria", again in Munich.

Meanwhile, the support for the "archaebacteria" concept – and also for the idea of a phylogenetic division into three groups on the basis of 16S rRNA sequencing and additional characteristics – had grown, but had still not yet been generally accepted by the scientific community. Also an intensive controversial discussion about the level of classification and terminology was taking place (e.g. terms like urkingdom, primary kingdom, empire etc. were considered). This discussion is documented in detail in Sapp (2009, especially chapters 19, 20).

Finally, after about 13 years of cooperation, in their publication of 1990 (Woese, Kandler, Wheelis), Woese and Kandler proposed a "tree of life" consisting of three lines of descent (see adjacent "Phylogenetic Tree of Life") for which they introduced the term domain as the highest rank of classification, above the kingdom level. They also suggested the terms Archaea, Bacteria and Eucarya (later corrected to Eukarya) for the three domains and presented the formal description of the taxon Archaea. Up to date, this publication is one of the most frequently cited papers in the Proceedings of the National Academy of Sciences of the United States of America. (The role of the third author is described by Sapp (pp. 261f. and 386) and Quammen (pp. 210f.)) In a second publication, they contrasted their natural system of "global classification", a phylogenetic division on the basis of 16S rRNA sequencing, with the conventional division of organisms into two (procaryotes-eucaryotes system) or into five (5-kingdom system) groupings. Today the division of the tree of life into three domains – levels above kingdoms – is textbook knowledge.

== Early evolution and diversification of life (pre-cell theory) ==
Kandler has always been interested in the early evolution and diversification of life and, finally, presented his pre-cell theory.

Early diversification of life with Kandler's pre-cell theory (Kandler 1998, p. 22)

He assumed that the early evolution of organisms did not start from a common first ancestral cell, but that each domain evolved by "multiple cellularization of a multiphenotypical population of pre-cells", where the invention of cell envelopes played an important role.

A scheme of the pre-cell scenario is presented in the adjacent figure, where essential evolutionary improvements are indicated by numbers:

"(1) Reductive formation of organic compounds from CO or CO2 by Me-sulfur coordinative chemistry; (2) tapping of various redox energy sources and formation of primitive enzymes and templates; (3) elements of a transcription and translation apparatus and loose associations; (4) formation of pre-cells; (5) stabilised circular or linear genomes; (6) cytoplasmic membranes; (7) rigid murein cell walls; (8) various non-murein rigid cell walls; (9) glycoproteinaceous cell envelope or glycokalyx; (10) cytoskeleton; (11) complex chromosomes and nuclear membrane; (12) cell organelles via endosymbiosis".^{: 22}

Kandler's contribution to our understanding of the early evolution of life was valued several times, e.g. Müller 1998, Wiegel 1998, Wächtershäuser 2003 and 2006, Schleifer 2011.

== Applied Microbiology ==
Louis Pasteur was one of Kandler's scientific heroes. Kandler liked to cite Pasteur's opinion that there is no "applied science", but that there are rather "applications of science". When he was director of the Bacteriological Institute of the South German Dairy Research Center in Freising-Weihenstephan, he concentrated on the microbiology of milk and dairy products, e.g. developed methods to prolong the shelf-life of milk, and tested the utilisation of Lactobacillus acidophilus in starter cultures for yoghurt. He also tested several procedures for the fermentation of milk and vegetable products or proposed methods for successfully combating micro-organisms in cooling water systems (more examples see Schleifer 2011. Later he conducted research on thermophilic methanogens and their ability to produce biogas from sewage or other waste.

== Ecology ==
Kandler's role as an early representative of scientific ecology is less known. He was a cofounder of the "commission for ecology" at the Bavarian Academy of Sciences (now "Forum für Ökologie" – panel for ecology), of which he was a member until 2006. His interest in ecology was broad; for instance he dealt with bacterial interactions, forest conditions and the return of lichens into the city of Munich.

Since the early 1980s, research on the so-called "Waldsterben" (forest death) in Germany was substantially sponsored by the German Ministry of Science and Technology. On the basis of his own investigations, Kandler became a decided critic.

== Awards and memberships ==
- 1971 German National Academy of Sciences Leopoldina
- 1981 Dr. h.c. (Ghent University)
- 1982 Regensburger Botanische Gesellschaft
- 1982 Bergey Award
- 1983 Bavarian Academy of Sciences and Humanities
- 1983 Mycological Society of India
- 1984 Hermann Weigmann-Medaille
- 1985 Dr. h.c. (Technical University of Munich)
- 1989 Ferdinand-Cohn-Medaille
- 1991 Honorary member of Deutsche Botanische Gesellschaft
- 1992 Order of Merit of the Federal Republic of Germany
- 1994 Honorary member of Gesellschaft für Allgemeine und Angewandte Mikrobiologie
- 2005 Bavarian Order of Merit

== Selected publications ==
- Kandler, Otto (1950). Über die Beziehungen zwischen Phosphathaushalt und Photosynthese: I. Phosphatspiegelschwankungen bei Chlorella pyrenoidosa als Folge des Licht-Dunkel-Wechsels. [On the relationship between the phosphate metabolism and photosynthesis I. Variations in phosphate levels in Chlorella pyrenoidosa as a consequence of light-dark changes]. Zeitschrift für Naturforschung 5b, 423–437 pdf.
- Kandler, O (1960). "Energy transfer through phosphorylation mechanisms in Photosynthesis". Annual Review of Plant Physiology. 11: 37–54. doi:10.1146/annurev.pp.11.060160.000345.
- Schleifer, K.-H.; Kandler, O. (1972). "Peptidoglycan types of bacterial cell Walls and their taxonomic implications". Bacteriological Reviews. 36 (4): 407–477. doi:10.1128/MMBR.36.4.407-477.1972. PMC 408328. PMID 4568761.
- Kandler, O.; Hippe, H. (1977). "Lack of peptidoglycan in the cell walls of Methanosarcina barkeri" (PDF). Archives of Microbiology. 113 (1–2): 57–60. Bibcode:1977ArMic.113...57K. doi:10.1007/bf00428580. PMID 889387. S2CID 19145374.
- König, H.; Kandler, O. (1979). "N-Acetyltalosaminuronic acid a constituent of the pseudomurein of the genus Methanobacterium". Archives of Microbiology. 123 (3): 295–299. Bibcode:1979ArMic.123..295K. doi:10.1007/BF00406664. S2CID 42830749.
- Kandler, Otto (1982). "Cell Wall Structures and their Phylogenetic Implications". Zentralblatt für Bakteriologie Mikrobiologie und Hygiene: I. Abt. Originale C: Allgemeine, Angewandte und Ökologische Mikrobiologie. 3: 149–160. doi:10.1016/S0721-9571(82)80063-X.
- Woese Carl R.; Kandler, O.; Wheelis, M.L. (1990). "Towards a natural system of organisms: proposal for the domains Archaea, Bacteria, and Eucarya". Proceedings of the National Academy of Sciences of the United States of America. 87 (12): 4576–4579. Bibcode:1990PNAS...87.4576W. doi:10.1073/pnas.87.12.4576. ISSN 0027-8424. PMC 54159. PMID 2112744.
- Kandler, Otto (1993). "Cell Wall Biochemistry and Three-Domain Concept of Life". Systematic and Applied Microbiology. 16 (4): 501–509. Bibcode:1993SyApM..16..501K. doi:10.1016/S0723-2020(11)80319-X.
- Kandler, O (1994). "Vierzehn Jahre Waldschadensdiskussion: Szenarien und Fakten" (PDF). Naturwissenschaftliche Rundschau. 47: 419–430.
- Kandler, O (1995). "Cell Wall Biochemistry in Archaea and its Phylogenetic Implications". Journal of Biological Physics. 20 (1–4): 165–169. doi:10.1007/BF00700433. S2CID 83906865.
- Kandler, O. (1998). The early diversification of life and the origin of the three domains: A proposal. pp. 19–31. In: Thermophiles: The keys to molecular evolution and the origin of life? (J. Wiegel & M.W. Adams eds.) Taylor and Francis Ltd. London, UK googlebooks
- Kandler, O.; König, H. (1998). "Cell wall polymers in Archaea (Archaebacteria)". Cellular and Molecular Life Sciences. 54 (4): 305–308. doi:10.1007/s000180050156. PMC 11147200. PMID 9614965. S2CID 13527169.
- all publications: BAdW

== Biographies and obituaries ==
- Müller, H.E. (1998). Portrait: "Otto Kandler und die moderne Mikrobiologie". Der Mikrobiologe. Mitteilungen des Berufsverbands der Ärzte für Mikrobiologie, Virologie und Infektionsepidemiologie 8(3), 38–43 BAdW.
- Sapp, J. (2009). The New Foundations of Evolution: On the Tree of Life. Oxford, New York: Oxford University Press. ISBN 978-0-19-973438-2 googlebooks.
- Schleifer, K.-H. (2011). "Prof Dr Dr h.c. mult Otto Kandler: distinguished botanist and microbiologist". The Bulletin of BISMiS. 2 (2): 141–148. (Bergey's International Society for Microbial Systematics) BAdW.
- Tanner, W. (23 November 2017). Obituary: Professor Dr. Otto Kandler (1920–2017). Deutsche Botanische Gesellschaft.
- Govindjee; Tanner, W. (2018). "Remembering Otto Kandler (1920–2017) and his contributions". Photosynthesis Research. 137 (3): 337–340. Bibcode:2018PhoRe.137..337G. doi:10.1007/s11120-018-0530-z. PMID 29948750. S2CID 49426075. (typo in abstract: the three forms of life are Bacteria, Archaea, Eukarya).
- Tanner, W.; Renner, S. (September 2018). Obituary - Prof. Dr. Dr. h.c. mult. OTTO KANDLER BAdW
- for further reading BAdW.
