= Jane Gibson =

British-American microbiologist and biochemist (1924–2008)

- Born: Audrey Jane Pinsent; October 5, 1924; Paris, France
- Died: June 10, 2008 (aged 83); Etna, New Hampshire, USA
- Occupation: Microbiologist
- Years active: 1946–2008

Audrey Jane Gibson (née Pinsent; October 5, 1924 – June 10, 2008) was a British-American microbiologist and biochemist who worked in the field of photosynthetic bacteria. She discovered that selenium is required by the metabolism of coliform bacteria and described a new species of sulphur bacterium in the genus Chloroherpeton. She became a Professor at Cornell University in 1979 and was editor of the scientific journal Applied and Environmental Microbiology.

== Early life ==
Born Audrey Jane Pinsent on October 5, 1924 in Paris, daughter of Gerald Hume Saverie Pinsent (1888–1976), whom later became comptroller-general of the UK National Debt Office. Her mother was Katharine Kentisbeare (1884–1949), daughter of the Liberal MP, Sir George Radford.

Her early years were spent in both Switzerland and Devon. She attended The Maynard School in Exeter, England and went on to earn a first-class honours degree in biochemistry at Newnham College, Cambridge in 1946 under the advisory of biochemist, Marjory Stephenson. In 1949, she earned a PhD in microbiology at the Lister Institute of the University of London under the advisory of Dr. D. Herbert.

== Career and achievements ==
Whilst based at the Lister Institute in 1954, Gibson published her discovery that the trace element selenium, along with molybdenum, is an essential requirement for bacterial growth, specifically the production of formate dehydrogenase in coliform bacteria (e.g. Escherichia coli).

Following receipt of a postgraduate fellowship from the Commonwealth Fund, Gibson then spent a year working with C. B. van Niel at the Hopkins Marine Station of Stanford University in California where she developed an interest in photosynthetic bacteria. On her return to Britain she took up a post at Professor Sidney Elsden's microbiology laboratory at the University of Sheffield. Her work there involved characterizing c-type cytochromes from photosynthetic bacteria.

Whilst at the University of Sheffield, Audrey Jane Pinsent met her future husband, biochemist Quentin Gibson, in 1951. They married and had four children. Now Jane Gibson, she continued working part-time. In 1963, they emigrated to the United States, where she took up positions, first at the University of Pennsylvania and then, three years later, at the Section of Microbiology at Cornell University where, in 1970, she was made Associate Professor and served as Acting Chairman. Gibson later moved to the Section of Biochemistry, Molecular and Cell Biology, and was promoted to full Professor in 1979.

Her research focused on the transport and utilization of ammonia and other small organic compounds by the main groups of phototrophic bacteria, and she became expert in their care and culture. Gibson also studied the growth of cyanobacteria, co-authoring a paper with Carl Woese and George E. Fox that demonstrated the close evolutionary relationship that many gram-negative bacteria such as E. coli have with purple photosynthetic bacteria. She was made a full professor in 1979 and in 1994 she won the Edith Edgerton Career Teaching Award.

Gibson's research predominantly focused on green photosynthetic bacteria. In 1984, she described a new species of sulphur bacterium, Chloroherpeton thalassium, isolated from marine sediments found near Woods Hole, Massachusetts.

In the latter part of her career, Gibson utilized the purple non-sulfur bacterium, Rhodopseudomonas palustris, to study the anaerobic degradation of the benzene ring, a significant step in the breakdown of polluting hydrocarbons in the environment.

In 1983, Gibson was appointed to the editorial board of the Journal of Bacteriology, where she served until 1991. Between 1989 and 1995 she was also editor of the scientific journal Applied and Environmental Microbiology. She was also a Fellow of the American Academy of Microbiology.

== Later life ==
When Gibson's husband developed a stomach ulcer in 1969, they decided to spend their summers in Woods Hole. In 1970, they bought a house and a sailboat and spent the next 20 years there. Jane Gibson taught summer microbiology courses at the Marine Biological Laboratory, whilst her husband collected fish blood for his research at Cornell University.

The Gibsons retired from Cornell University in 1996, and relocated to Etna, New Hampshire. Their winter months were spent in Houston, Texas. Jane Gibson continued her teaching legacy in the microbiology department at the University of Texas Medical School, whilst her husband worked in a kinetics laboratory at Rice University.

Jane Gibson died at her home in Etna on June 10, 2008, aged 83.
