= Iron–sulfur world hypothesis =

Hypothetical scenario for the origin of life

The iron–sulfur world hypothesis is a set of proposals for the origin of life and the early evolution of life advanced in a series of articles between 1988 and 1992 by Günter Wächtershäuser, a Munich patent lawyer with a degree in chemistry, who had been encouraged and supported by philosopher Karl R. Popper to publish his ideas. The hypothesis proposes that early life may have formed on the surface of iron sulfide minerals, hence the name. It was developed by retrodiction (making a "prediction" about the past) from extant biochemistry (non-extinct, surviving biochemistry) in conjunction with chemical experiments.

== Origin of life ==
=== Pioneer organism ===
Wächtershäuser proposes that the earliest form of life, termed the "pioneer organism", originated in a volcanic hydrothermal flow at high pressure and high (100 °C) temperature. It had a composite structure of a mineral base with catalytic transition metal centers (predominantly iron and nickel, but also perhaps cobalt, manganese, tungsten and zinc). The catalytic centers catalyzed autotrophic carbon fixation pathways generating small molecule (non-polymer) organic compounds from inorganic gases (e.g. carbon monoxide, carbon dioxide, hydrogen cyanide and hydrogen sulfide). These organic compounds were retained on or in the mineral base as organic ligands of the transition metal centers with a flow retention time in correspondence with their mineral bonding strength thereby defining an autocatalytic "surface metabolism". The catalytic transition metal centers became autocatalytic by being accelerated by their organic products turned ligands. The carbon fixation metabolism became autocatalytic by forming a metabolic cycle in the form of a primitive sulfur-dependent version of the reductive citric acid cycle. Accelerated catalysts expanded the metabolism and new metabolic products further accelerated the catalysts. The idea is that once such a primitive autocatalytic metabolism was established, its intrinsically synthetic chemistry began to produce ever more complex organic compounds, ever more complex pathways and ever more complex catalytic centers.

=== Nutrient conversions ===
The water–gas shift reaction (CO + H_{2}O → CO_{2} + H_{2}) occurs in volcanic fluids with diverse catalysts or without catalysts. The combination of ferrous sulfide (FeS, troilite) and hydrogen sulfide (H_{2}S) as reducing agents (both reagents are simultaneously oxidized in the reaction here under creating the disulfide bond, S–S) in conjunction with pyrite (FeS_{2}) formation:

FeS + H_{2}S → FeS_{2} + 2 H^{+} + 2 e^{−}

or with H_{2} directly produced instead of 2 H^{+} + 2 e^{−}

FeS + H_{2}S → FeS_{2} + H_{2}

has been demonstrated under mild volcanic conditions. This key result has been disputed. Nitrogen fixation has been demonstrated for the isotope ^{15}N_{2} in conjunction with pyrite formation. Ammonia forms from nitrate with FeS/H_{2}S as reductant. Methylmercaptan [CH_{3}-SH] and carbon oxysulfide [COS] form from CO_{2} and FeS/H_{2}S, or from CO and H_{2} in the presence of NiS.

=== Synthetic reactions ===
Reaction of carbon monoxide (CO), hydrogen sulfide (H_{2}S) and methanethiol CH_{3}SH in the presence of nickel sulfide and iron sulfide generates the methyl thioester of acetic acid [CH_{3}-CO-SCH_{3}] and presumably thioacetic acid (CH_{3}-CO-SH) as the simplest activated acetic acid analogues of acetyl-CoA. These activated acetic acid derivatives serve as starting materials for subsequent exergonic synthetic steps. They also serve for energy coupling with endergonic reactions, notably the formation of (phospho)anhydride compounds. However, Huber and Wächtershäuser reported low 0.5% acetate yields based on the input of CH_{3}SH (methanethiol) (8 mM) in the presence of 350 mM CO. This is about 500 times and 3700 times the highest CH_{3}SH and CO concentrations respectively measured to date in a natural hydrothermal vent fluid.

Reaction of nickel hydroxide with hydrogen cyanide (HCN) (in the presence or absence of ferrous hydroxide, hydrogen sulfide or methyl mercaptan) generates nickel cyanide, which reacts with carbon monoxide (CO) to generate pairs of α-hydroxy and α-amino acids: e.g. glycolate/glycine, lactate/alanine, glycerate/serine; as well as pyruvic acid in significant quantities. Pyruvic acid is also formed at high pressure and high temperature from CO, H_{2}O, FeS in the presence of nonyl mercaptan. Reaction of pyruvic acid or other α-keto acids with ammonia in the presence of ferrous hydroxide or in the presence of ferrous sulfide and hydrogen sulfide generates alanine or other α-amino acids. Reaction of α-amino acids in aqueous solution with COS or with CO and H_{2}S generates a peptide cycle wherein dipeptides, tripeptides etc. are formed and subsequently degraded via N-terminal hydantoin moieties and N-terminal urea moieties and subsequent cleavage of the N-terminal amino acid unit.

Proposed reaction mechanism for reduction of CO_{2} on FeS: Ying et al. (2007) have shown that direct transformation of mackinawite (FeS) to pyrite (FeS_{2}) on reaction with H_{2}S till 300 °C is not possible without the presence of critical amount of oxidant. In the absence of any oxidant, FeS reacts with H_{2}S up to 300 °C to give pyrrhotite. Farid et al. have experimentally shown that mackinawite (FeS) has ability to reduce CO_{2} to CO at temperature higher than 300 °C. They reported that the surface of FeS is oxidized, which on reaction with H_{2}S gives pyrite (FeS_{2}). It is expected that CO reacts with H_{2}O in the Drobner experiment to give H_{2}.

== Early evolution ==
Early evolution is defined as beginning with the origin of life and ending with the last universal common ancestor (LUCA). According to the iron–sulfur world theory it covers a coevolution of cellular organization (cellularization), the genetic machinery and enzymatization of the metabolism.

=== Cellularization ===
Cellularization occurs in several stages. It may have begun with the formation of primitive lipids (e.g. fatty acids or isoprenoids) in the surface metabolism. These lipids accumulate on or in the mineral base. This lipophilizes the outer or inner surfaces of the mineral base, which promotes condensation reactions over hydrolytic reactions by lowering the activity of water and protons.

In the next stage lipid membranes are formed. While still anchored to the mineral base they form a semi-cell bounded partly by the mineral base and partly by the membrane. Further lipid evolution leads to self-supporting lipid membranes and closed cells. The earliest closed cells are pre-cells (sensu Kandler) because they allow frequent exchange of genetic material (e.g. by fusions). According to Woese, this frequent exchange of genetic material is the cause for the existence of the common stem in the tree of life and for a very rapid early evolution. Nick Lane and coauthors state that "Non-enzymatic equivalents of glycolysis, the pentose phosphate pathway and gluconeogenesis have been identified as well. Multiple syntheses of amino acids from α-keto acids by direct reductive amination and by transamination reactions can also take place. Long-chain fatty acids can be formed by hydrothermal Fischer-Tropsch-type synthesis which chemically resembles the process of fatty acid elongation. Recent work suggests that nucleobases might also be formed following the universally conserved biosynthetic pathways, using metal ions as catalysts".

Metabolic intermediates in glycolysis and the pentose phosphate pathway such as glucose, pyruvate, ribose 5-phosphate, and erythrose-4-phosphate are spontaneously generated in the presence of Fe(II). Fructose 1,6-biphosphate, a metabolic intermediate in gluconeogenesis, was shown to have been continuously accumulated but only in a frozen solution. The formation of fructose 1,6-biphosphate was accelerated by lysine and glycine which implies the earliest anabolic enzymes were amino acids. It had been reported that 4Fe-4S, 2Fe-2S, and mononuclear iron clusters are spontaneously formed in low concentrations of cysteine and alkaline pH. Methyl thioacetate, a precursor to acetyl-CoA can be synthesized in conditions relevant to hydrothermal vents. Phosphorylation of methyl thioacetate leads to the synthesis of thioacetate, a simpler precursor to acetyl-CoA. Thioacetate in more cooler and neutral conditions promotes synthesis of acetyl phosphate which is a precursor to adenosine triphosphate and is capable of phosphorylating ribose and nucleosides. This suggests that acetyl phosphate was likely synthesized in thermophoresis and mixing between the acidic seawater and alkaline hydrothermal fluid in interconnected micropores. It is possible that it could promote nucleotide polymerization at mineral surfaces or at low water activity. Thermophoresis at hydrothermal vent pores can concentrate polyribonucleotides, but it remains unknown as to how it could promote coding and metabolic reactions.

In mathematical simulations, autocatalytic nucleotide synthesis is proposed to promote protocell growth as nucleotides also catalyze CO_{2} fixation. Strong nucleotide catalysis of fatty acids and amino acids slow down protocell growth and if competition between catalytic function were to occur, this would disrupt the protocell. Weak or moderate nucleotide catalysis of amino acids via CO_{2} fixation would favor protocell division and growth. In 2017, a computational simulation of a protocell at an alkaline hydrothermal vent environment showed that "Some hydrophobic amino acids chelate FeS nanocrystals, producing three positive feedbacks: (i) an increase in catalytic surface area; (ii) partitioning of FeS nanocrystals to the membrane; and (iii) a proton-motive active site for carbon fixing that mimics the enzyme Ech". Maximal ATP synthesis would have occurred at high water activity in freshwater and high concentrations of Mg^{2+} and Ca^{2+} prevented synthesis of ATP, however the concentrations of divalent cations in Hadean oceans were much lower than in modern oceans and alkaline hydrothermal vent concentrations of Mg^{2+} and Ca^{2+} are typically lower than in the ocean. Such environments would have generated Fe^{3+} which would have promoted ADP phosphorylation. The mixture of seawater and alkaline hydrothermal vent fluid can promote cycling between Fe^{3+} and Fe^{2+}. Experimental research of biomimetic prebiotic reactions such as the reduction of NAD^{+} and phosphoryl transfer also support an origin of life occurring at an alkaline hydrothermal vent .

=== Proto-ecological systems ===
William Martin and Michael Russell suggest that the first cellular life forms may have evolved inside alkaline hydrothermal vents at seafloor spreading zones in the deep sea. These structures consist of microscale caverns that are coated by thin membraneous metal sulfide walls. Therefore, these structures would resolve several critical points germane to Wächtershäuser's suggestions at once:

1. the micro-caverns provide a means of concentrating newly synthesised molecules, thereby increasing the chance of forming oligomers;
2. the steep temperature gradients inside the hydrothermal vent allow for establishing "optimum zones" of partial reactions in different regions of the vent (e.g. monomer synthesis in the hotter, oligomerisation in the cooler parts);
3. the flow of hydrothermal water through the structure provides a constant source of building blocks and energy (chemical disequilibrium between hydrothermal hydrogen and marine carbon dioxide);
4. the model allows for a succession of different steps of cellular evolution (prebiotic chemistry, monomer and oligomer synthesis, peptide and protein synthesis, RNA world, ribonucleoprotein assembly and DNA world) in a single structure, facilitating exchange between all developmental stages;
5. synthesis of lipids as a means of "closing" the cells against the environment is not necessary, until basically all cellular functions are developed.

This model locates the "last universal common ancestor" (LUCA) within the inorganically formed physical confines of an alkaline hydrothermal vent, rather than assuming the existence of a free-living form of LUCA. The last evolutionary step en route to bona fide free-living cells would be the synthesis of a lipid membrane that finally allows the organisms to leave the microcavern system of the vent. This postulated late acquisition of the biosynthesis of lipids as directed by genetically encoded peptides is consistent with the presence of completely different types of membrane lipids in archaea and bacteria (plus eukaryotes). The kind of vent at the foreground of their suggestion is chemically more similar to the warm (ca. 100 °C) off ridge vents such as Lost City than to the more familiar black smoker type vents (ca. 350 °C).

In an abiotic world, a thermocline of temperatures and a chemocline in concentration is associated with the pre-biotic synthesis of organic molecules, hotter in proximity to the chemically rich vent, cooler but also less chemically rich at greater distances. The migration of synthesized compounds from areas of high concentration to areas of low concentration gives a directionality that provides both source and sink in a self-organizing fashion, enabling a proto-metabolic process by which acetic acid production and its eventual oxidization can be spatially organized.

In this way many of the individual reactions that are today found in central metabolism could initially have occurred independent of any developing cell membrane. Each vent microcompartment is functionally equivalent to a single cell. Chemical communities having greater structural integrity and resilience to wildly fluctuating conditions are then selected for; their success would lead to local zones of depletion for important precursor chemicals. Progressive incorporation of these precursor components within a cell membrane would gradually increase metabolic complexity within the cell membrane, whilst leading to greater environmental simplicity in the external environment. In principle, this could lead to the development of complex catalytic sets capable of self-maintenance.

Russell adds a significant factor to these ideas, by pointing out that semi-permeable mackinawite (an iron sulfide mineral) and silicate membranes could naturally develop under these conditions and electrochemically link reactions separated in space, if not in time.

== Alternative environment ==
The 6 of the 11 metabolic intermediates in reverse Krebs cycle promoted by Fe, Zn^{2+}, and Cr^{3+} in acidic conditions imply that protocells possibly emerged in locally metal-rich and acidic terrestrial hydrothermal fields. The acidic conditions are seemingly consistent with the stabilization of RNA. These hydrothermal fields would have exhibited cycling of freezing and thawing and a variety of temperature gradients that would promote nonenzymatic reactions of gluconeogenesis, nucleobase synthesis, nonenzymatic polymerization, and RNA replication. ATP synthesis and oxidation of ferrous iron via photochemical reactions or oxidants such as nitric oxide derived from lightning strikes, meteorite impacts, or volcanic emissions could have also occurred at hydrothermal fields.

Wet-dry cycling of hydrothermal fields would polymerize RNA and peptides, protocell aggregation in a moist gel phase during wet-dry cycling would allow diffusion of metabolic products across neighboring protocells. Protocell aggregation could be described as a primitive version of horizontal gene transfer. Fatty acid vesicles would be stabilized by polymers in the presence of Mg^{2+} required for ribozyme activity. These prebiotic processes might have occurred in shaded areas that protect the emergence of early cellular life under ultraviolet irradiation. Long chain alcohols and monocarboxylic acids would have also been synthesized via Fischer–Tropsch synthesis. Hydrothermal fields would also have precipitates of transition metals and concentrated many elements including CHNOPS. Geothermal convection could also be a source of energy for the emergence of the proton motive force, phosphoryl group transfer, coupling between oxidation-reduction, and active transport. It's noted by David Deamer and Bruce Damer that these environments seemingly resemble Charles Darwin's idea of a "warm little pond".

The problems with the hypothesis of a subaerial hydrothermal field of abiogenesis is that the proposed chemistry doesn't resemble known biochemical reactions. The abundance of subaerial hydrothermal fields would have been rare and offered no protection from either meteorites or ultraviolet irradiation. Clay minerals at subaerial hydrothermal fields would absorb organic reactants. Pyrophosphate has low solubility in water and can't be phosphorylated without a phosphorylating agent. It doesn't offer explanations for the origin of chemiosmosis and differences between Archaea and Bacteria.

== See also ==
- Abiogenesis
- Iron–sulfur protein
- RNA world
- RNP world
- Miller–Urey experiment
