= Cellularization =

Scientific theories regarding the origins and formation of cells

In evolutionary biology, the term cellularization (also spelled cellularisation) has been used in theories to explain the evolution of cells from non-cellular components, for instance in the pre-cell theory, dealing with the evolution of the first cells on Earth, and in the syncytial theory, which attempts to explain the origins of multicellular Metazoa from simpler unicellular organisms.

Processes of cell development in multinucleate cells (known as syncytia) of animals and plants are also termed cellularization, often called syncytium cellularization.

Early diversification of life with Kandler's pre-cell theory. Key: 1. Reductive formation of organic compounds from CO or CO_{2} by methyl-sulfur coordination chemistry.; 2. Tapping of various redox energy sources and formation of primitive enzymes and templates.; 3. Elements of a transcription and translation apparatus and loose associations.; 4. Formation of pre-cells.; 5. Stabilised circular or linear genomes.; 6. Cytoplasmic membranes.; 7. Rigid murein cell walls.; 8. Various rigid non-murein cell walls.; 9. Glycoproteinaceous cell envelope or glycocalyx.; 10. Cytoskeleton.; 11. Complex chromosomes and nuclear membrane.; 12. Cell organelles via endosymbiosis.

== The pre-cell theory ==
According to Otto Kandler's pre-cell theory, the early evolution of life and primordial metabolism (see iron-sulfur world hypothesis metabolism-first scenario, according to Wächtershäuser) led to the early diversification of life through the evolution of a "multiphenotypical population of pre-cells", from which the three founder groups A, B, and C, and then, from them, the precursor cells (here named proto-cells) of the three domains of life emerged successively.

In this scenario the three domains of life did not originate from an ancestral nearly complete “first cell“ nor a cellular organism often defined as the last universal common ancestor (LUCA), but from a population of evolving pre-cells. Kandler introduced the term cellularization for his concept of a successive evolution of cells by a process of evolutionary improvements.

His concept may explain the quasi-random distribution of evolutionarily important features among the three domains and, at the same time, the existence of the most basic biochemical features (the genetic code, the set of protein amino acids, etc.) in all three domains (unity of life), as well as the close relationship between the Archaea and the Eukarya. Kandler’s pre-cell theory is supported by Wächtershäuser.

According to Kandler, the protection of fragile primordial life forms from their environment by the invention of envelopes (i.e. cell membranes and cell walls) was an essential improvement. For instance, the emergence of rigid cell walls by the invention and elaboration of peptidoglycan in domain Bacteria may have been a prerequisite for their successful survival, radiation, and colonization of virtually all habitats of the geosphere and hydrosphere.

A coevolution of the biosphere and the geosphere is suggested: “The evolving life could venture into a larger variety of habitats, even into microaerobic habitats in shallow, illuminated surface waters. The continuous changes in the physical environment on the aging and cooling Earth led to further diversification of habitats and favored opportunistic radiation of primitive life into numerous phenotypes on the basis of each of the different chemolithoautotrophies. Concomitantly, with the accumulation of organic matter derived from chemolithoautotrophic life, opportunistic and obligate heterotrophic life may also have developed”.

The details of Kandler's proposal for the early diversification of life are represented in a scheme, where numbers indicate evolutionary improvements.

== The syncytial theory or ciliate-acoel theory ==
This theory is also known as a theory of cellularization. It is a theory to explain the origin of the Metazoa. The idea was proposed by Hadži (1953) and Hanson (1977).

This cellularization (syncytial) theory states that metazoans evolved from a unicellular ciliate with multiple nuclei that went through cellularization. Firstly, the ciliate developed a ventral mouth for feeding and all nuclei moved to one side of the cell. Secondly, an epithelium was created by membranes forming barriers between the nuclei. In this way, a multicellular organism was created from one multinucleate cell (syncytium).

=== Example and criticism ===
==== Turbellarian flatworms ====
According to the syncytial theory, the ciliate ancestor, by several cellularization processes, evolved into the currently known turbellarian flatworms, which are therefore the most primitive metazoans. The theory of cellularization is based on the large similarities between ciliates and flatworms. Both ciliates and flatworms have cilia, are bilaterally symmetric, and syncytial. Therefore, the theory assumes that bilateral symmetry is more primitive than radial symmetry. However, current biological evidence shows that the most primitive forms of metazoans show radial symmetry, and thus radially symmetrical animals like cnidaria cannot be derived from bilateral flatworms.

By concluding that the first multicellular animals were flatworms, it is also suggested that simpler organisms as sponges, ctenophores and cnidarians would have derived from more complex animals. However, most current molecular research has shown that sponges are the most primitive metazoans.

==== Germ layers are formed simultaneously ====
The syncytial theory rejects the theory of germ layers. During the development of the turbellaria (Acoela), three regions are formed without the formation of germ layers. From this, it was concluded that the germ layers are simultaneously formed during the cellularization process. This is in contrast to germ layer theory in which ectoderm, endoderm and mesoderm (in more complex animals) build up the embryo.

==== The macro and micronucleus of ciliates ====
There is a lot of evidence against ciliates being the metazoan ancestor. Ciliates have two types of nuclei: a micronucleus which is used as germline nucleus and a macronucleus which regulates the vegetative growth. This division of nuclei is a unique feature of the ciliates and is not found in any other members of the animal kingdom. Therefore, it would be unlikely that ciliates are indeed the ancestors of the metazoans. This is confirmed by molecular phylogenetic research. Ciliates were never found close to animals in any molecular phylogeny.

==== Flagellated sperm ====
Furthermore, the syncytial theory cannot explain the flagellated sperm of metazoans. Since the ciliate ancestor does not have any flagella and it is unlikely that the flagella arose as a de novo trait in metazoans, the syncytial theory makes it almost impossible to explain the origin of flagellated sperm.

Due to both the lack of molecular and morphological evidence for this theory, the alternative colonial theory of Haeckel, is currently gaining widespread acceptance.

For more theories see main article Multicellular organisms.

== Cellularization in a syncytium (syncytium cellularization) ==
The development of cells in a syncytium (multinucleate cells) is termed syncytium cellularization. Syncytia are quite frequent in animals and plants. Syncytium cellularization occurs for instance in the embryonic development of animals and in endosperm development of plants. Here two examples:

=== Drosophila melanogaster development ===
In the embryonic development of Drosophila melanogaster, first 13 nuclear divisions take place forming a syncytial blastoderm consisting of approximately 6000 nuclei. During the later gastrulation stage, membranes are formed between the nuclei, and cellularization is completed.

=== Syncytium cellularization in plants ===
The term syncytium cellularization is used for instance for a process of cell development in the endosperm of the Poaceae, e.g. barley (Hordeum vulgare), rice (Oryza sativa).

== See also ==
- Syncytium
- Multicellular organism
- Ciliate
- Evolutionary biology
