= David Stahl =

David Stahl may refer to:

- David Stahl (conductor) (1949–2010), American conductor
- David Henry Stahl (1920–1970), American attorney and federal judge
- David Stahl (biologist), American scientist and professor of environmental engineering
- David Stahl, mayor of East Brunswick, New Jersey
- David Stahl (Businessman) (1986–Present), American businessman, entrepreneur, hedge fund manager
