= Jan Sapp =

Canadian historian of science (born 1954)

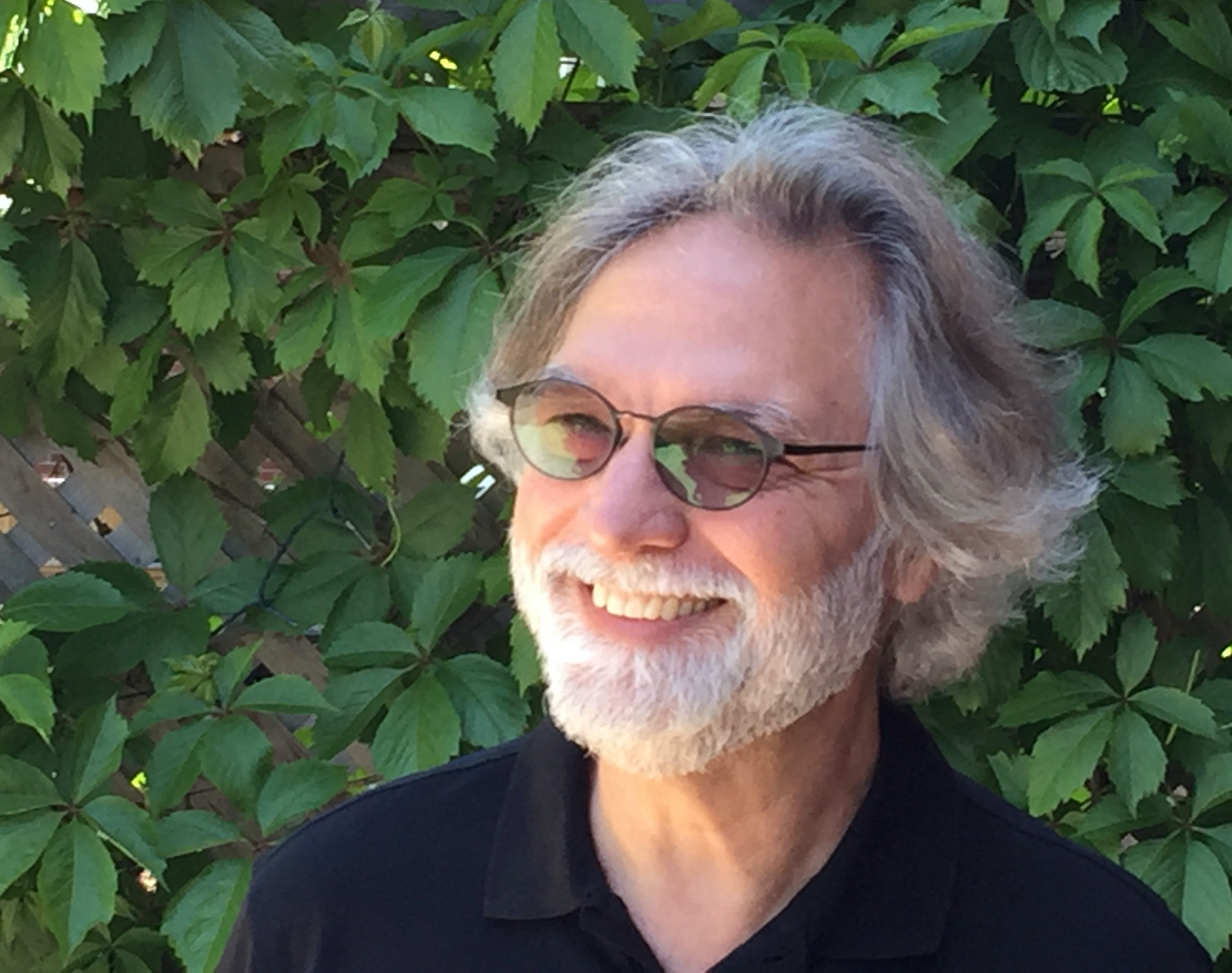
- Sapp in 2017
- Born: Jan Anthony Sapp; June 12, 1954 (age 72); Halifax, Nova Scotia, Canada
- Scientific career
- Fields: Biology, history
- Workplaces: York University

Jan Anthony Sapp (born June 12, 1954) is a retired Professor (now Senior Research Scholar) in the Department of Biology, York University, Canada. His writings focus especially on evolutionary biology beyond the classical neo-Darwinian framework, and emphasize the fundamental importance of symbiosis and horizontal gene transfer in heredity and evolution.

== Career ==
Sapp was born in Halifax, Nova Scotia. He completed his BSc hons (Biology) at Dalhousie University in 1976 before earning his MSc and Phd at the Institut d’histoire et de sociopolitique des sciences, at l'Université de Montréal in 1984. He subsequently held an appointment at the University of Melbourne for eight years, where he also served as chair of the Department of History and Philosophy of Science. He was Andrew Mellon Fellow at the Rockefeller University, 1991–92. He held the Canada Research Chair (tier 1) in the History of the Biological Sciences at l’Université du Québec à Montréal from 2001 to 2003 before returning to York University where he has been a professor since 1992.

Sapp's book Evolution by Association (1994) is the first book to document the history of symbiosis in depth. It was described in a review as a "fine piece of scholarship". He subsequently introduced the terms "symbiome" and "symbiomics" to biology in his book Genesis: The Evolution of Biology (2003). He developed this line of historical research beyond classical neoDarwinian biology further in his book on the history of microbial phylogenetics, The New Foundations of Evolution: On the Tree of Life (2009). He is also known for his writing on the coral reef crisis, focusing in detail on the outbreaks of crown of thorns starfish and coral bleaching. Coexistence: The Ecology and Evolution of Tropical Biology (2016) focuses on the history of tropical biology, and on what he calls the "central enigma" in tropical ecology.

In 2021, Sapp published Genes, Germs and Medicine, an exploration of the development of modern biomedical science in the United States through the life of Joshua Lederberg, an influential scientist. Lederberg his collaborators founded the field of bacterial genetics, and age 33, was the second youngest person in history to win the Nobel Prize. He helped to lay the foundations for genetic engineering, made fundamental revisions to immunological and evolutionary theory, and developed medical genetics.

== Bibliography ==
1. Sapp, Jan (2021). Genes, Germs and Medicine: The Life of Joshua Lederberg. Singapore: World Scientific. ISBN 9789811235986.
2. Sapp, Jan (2016). Coexistence: The Ecology and Evolution of Tropical Biodiversity. Oxford; New York: Oxford University Press. ISBN 978-0190632441.
3. Sapp, Jan (2009). The New Foundations of Evolution: On the Tree of Life. Oxford; New York: Oxford University Press. ISBN 9780195388497.
4. Microbial Phylogeny and Evolution: Concepts and Controversies. Jan Sapp (ed.). Oxford University Press, USA. 2005. ISBN 978-0195168778.
5. Sapp, Jan (2003). Genesis: The Evolution of Biology. Oxford: New York : Oxford University Press. ISBN 978-0195156195.
6. Sapp, Jan (1999). What is Natural? : Coral Reef Crisis. New York: Oxford University Press. ISBN 9780195123647.
7. Sapp, Jan (1994). Evolution by Association: A History of Symbiosis. New York: Oxford University Press. ISBN 9780195088212.
8. Sapp, Jan (1990). Where the Truth Lies: Franz Moewus and the Origins of Molecular Biology. Cambridge [England]; New York: Cambridge University Press. ISBN 978-0521365505.
9. Sapp, Jan (1987). Beyond the Gene: Cytoplasmic Inheritance and the Struggle for Authority in Genetics. Monographs on the history and philosophy of biology. New York: Oxford University Press. ISBN 978-0195042061.

== Recent publications ==
1. Gilbert, S. F.; Sapp, J.; Tauber, A. I. (2012). "A symbiotic view of life: We have never been individuals". The Quarterly Review of Biology. 87 (4): 325–341. doi:10.1086/668166. PMID 23397797. S2CID 14279096. Archived from the original on 2021-04-29.
2. Pace, N. R.; Sapp, J.; Goldenfeld, N. (2012). "Classic Perspective: Phylogeny and beyond: Scientific, historical, and conceptual significance of the first tree of life". Proceedings of the National Academy of Sciences. 109 (4): 1011–1018. Bibcode:2012PNAS..109.1011P. doi:10.1073/pnas.1109716109. PMC 3268332. PMID 22308526.
3. Sapp, Jan (April 2012). "Race Finished". American Scientist. 100 (2): 164. doi:10.1511/2012.95.164. Archived from the original on 2015-09-05.
4. Sapp, Jan (2012). "Evolution Replayed". BioScience. 62 (7): 693–694. doi:10.1525/bio.2012.62.7.14.
5. Sapp, Jan (2012-10-22). "Too Fantastic for Polite Society". In Dorion Sagan (ed.). Lynn Margulis: the life and legacy of a scientific rebel (1 ed.). Vermont: Chelsea Green Publishing. pp. 54–67. ISBN 9781603584463.
6. Sapp, Jan (2012). "Horizontal Gene Transfer and the Tree of Life". In Joseph Seckbach (ed.). Genesis - In The Beginning. Cellular Origin, Life in Extreme Habitats and Astrobiology. Vol. 22. Dordrecht: Springer Netherlands. pp. 743–755. doi:10.1007/978-94-007-2941-4_37. ISBN 978-94-007-2941-4.
7. Sapp, Jan (2011). "Lamarckian Leaps in the Microbial World". In Snait Gissis; Eva Jablonka (eds.). Transformations of Lamarckism: from subtle fluids to molecular biology. Cambridge, Mass.: MIT Press. pp. 271–283. ISBN 9780262015141.
8. Sapp, J. (2010). "On the Origin of Symbiosis". In Joseph Seckbach; Martin Grube (eds.). Symbioses and Stress. Cellular Origin, Life in Extreme Habitats and Astrobiology. Vol. 17. Dordrecht: Springer Netherlands. pp. 3‒18. doi:10.1007/978-90-481-9449-0_1. ISBN 978-90-481-9449-0.
9. Sapp, J. (2010). "Saltational symbiosis". Theory in Biosciences. 129 (2–3): 125–133. doi:10.1007/s12064-010-0089-5. PMID 20535601. S2CID 10013954.
