= Woese's dogma =

Idea that ribosomal RNA was necessary for modern life

Woese's dogma is a principle of evolutionary biology first put forth by biophysicist Carl Woese in 1977. It states that the evolution of ribosomal RNA was a necessary precursor to the evolution of modern life forms. This led to the advancement of the phylogenetic tree of life consisting of three domains rather than the previously accepted two. While the existence of Eukarya and Prokarya were already accepted, Woese was responsible for the distinction between Bacteria and Archaea. Despite initial criticism and controversy surrounding his claims, Woese's three domain system, based on his work regarding the role of rRNA in the evolution of modern life, has become widely accepted.

== Homology as evidence for Woese's dogma ==
=== tRNA homology ===
Evidence for Woese's dogma is well established through comparisons of RNA homology. Modern research allows more liberal use of RNA sequencing, allowing for a better comparative analysis between distant RNA. When analyzing multiple strains of E. coli, Root-Bernstein et al. have compared tRNA encodings found within rRNA with tRNA found in E. coli to see if the secondary structure was the same as more "modern" tRNA present in E. coli. Comparisons between the tRNA encodings found in the rRNAs and mRNAs of the control sequences found that "sortings" for these sequences were extremely similar, and comparisons of translated protein structure indicated that homology was likely. Additionally, sequences homologous to all tRNAs necessary for translation were present in 16s and 23s rRNAs, and synthetases to load these tRNAs were also found, indicating that many of the functions of transcription and translation present in more modern life exist in rRNA, if vestigially.

=== rRNA homology ===
When comparing homologies of rRNA structures, it is necessary to analyze substructures. This is because models that study RNA structure on the whole do not currently exist. Generally, phylogenies of rRNA subunits are created to understand each component, and how they function and evolve. Through phylogenies created that depict rRNA structural elements that are present in all three domains of life, the oldest structural components can be determined through relative dating. These phylogenies were used in a study by Harish et al., to show that a helical stem labeled h44 in small subunit rRNA can be described as the oldest structural component of rRNA, which holds particular significance, as this structure responsible for linking processes in the small subunit, which is responsible for decoding, with the large subunit, which is responsible for the formation of peptide bonds and the releasing of elongation factors. This essentially shows that the functional origin of the ribosome, responsible for protein synthesis, is common in all modern life throughout each of the three domains.

Evidence has also been obtained in studying eukaryotic organelles, such as the chloroplast. Zablen et al.'s phylogenetic analysis conducted electrophoresis on chloroplast ribosomal RNA, specifically on the 16S rRNA of Euglena gracilis. In conducting this experiment, researchers compared the electrophoretic fingerprint of this RNA to other chloroplasts and prokarya. In comparing these results, it was found that generally, these chloroplasts show a close genomic relationship, while a more distant one is seen for algae, and subsequently prokaryotic organisms. This experiment shows that the rRNA of distantly related organisms has a similar origin of that in eukaryotic organelles, supporting the idea that the evolution of rRNA was a necessary precursor of modern life.

== Ribosomes as primordial self-replicating entities ==
One of the reasons that Woese's Dogma holds significance is because of the potential that RNA was the first primordial self-replicating molecule (see: RNA World), meaning it would be key in the progression of modern life. In particular, it has been proposed that ribosomes exist as a missing link in prebiotic evolution, with rRNA being a vestige of an ancient genome. Some evidence exists for the proposal that rRNA functioned in the past to encode proteins that are key to ribosome function. One notable example is the fact that rRNA proteins are commonly known to bind with their own mRNA. In addition, some ribosomal proteins not only regulate their own expression, but the expression of other proteins as well. These are both indications of self-replication, and indicate the possibility that the mRNA that encodes ribosomal proteins evolved from rRNA.

=== Criticisms ===
RNA existing as a primordial self replicating entity is an idea that faces criticism. The idea of rRNA in particular being sufficient on its own to explain the progression of modern life struggles due to the fact that it lacks certain key pieces of evidence. In particular RNA cannot be shown to be prebiotic, as there is no way for the nucleotides or nucleosides that compose it to be non-enzymatically replicated. Additionally, other criticisms exist, such as the fact that RNA is not stable enough to have arisen prebiotically, and that it is too complex to have arisen prebiotically. This has led to the development of other hypotheses, such as 'proteins first', which states that proteins arose prior to RNA, or coevolved with RNA. This has also led to the proposal of other primordial molecules that may have developed into RNA and DNA, such as peptide nucleic acids, which also show evidence of self replication. Despite the fact that criticisms might exist on the primordial or prebiotic nature of rRNA, these criticisms are not aimed at Woese's Dogma on the whole, as Woese's Dogma only claims that the evolution of rRNA was a necessary precursor to modern life, not that rRNA arose prebiotically.

== See also ==
- Woeseian revolution
