= Stanley Miller Medal =

The Stanley Miller Medal is an award to be presented by the National Academy of Sciences every five years to promote research and study in the fields of "research on Earth's early development as a planet, including prebiotic chemistry and the origin of life; planetary accretion, differentiation, and tectonics; and early evolution of the atmosphere and oceans".

The award was established in 2008 from a gift by NAS member Stanley Miller. It is linked to the well-established Charles Doolittle Walcott Medal and the two medals will be awarded alternatively and known collectively as the NAS Award in Early Earth and Life Sciences. Each medal is supplemented by a $10,000 award.

== Prizewinners ==
Source: NAS

- 2010: Gerald Francis Joyce (1st recipient)

For his pioneering experiments on the self-sustained replication and evolution of RNA enzymes (ribozymes), which illuminate key conceptual steps in the origin of life.

- 2016: James F. Kasting

For his outstanding modelling studies of planetary atmospheres and habitability that constrain the environmental context for the origin of life.

- 2019: Norman R. Pace

For his seminal contributions to the discovery of catalytic RNAs and his pioneering work on methods for delineating the diversity of life on Earth.

== See also ==
- List of geology awards
- Prizes named after people
