= Quentin Gibson =

British and American physiologist

Professor Quentin Gibson FRS
- Born: Quentin Howieson Gibson; 9 December 1918; Aberdeen, Scotland
- Died: 6 March 2011 (aged 92)
- Citizenship: British, American
- Education: Queen's University Belfast
- Spouse: Audrey Jane Pinsent
- Children: 4
- Scientific career
- Fields: Biochemistry of heme proteins
- Workplaces: University of Sheffield; Cornell University; University of Pennsylvania
- Notable students: Keith Moffat

Quentin Howieson Gibson FRS (9 December 1918 – 16 March 2011) was a Scottish American physiologist, and professor at the University of Sheffield, and Cornell University.

== Education ==
Gibson earned a Doctor of Medicine degree in 1944 and a Ph.D. in 1946, from Queen's University Belfast.

== Life ==
Gibson taught at the University of Sheffield from 1947. Whilst at the University of Sheffield Gibson met Audrey Jane Pinsent in 1951. They married, started a family, and eventually had four children. Jane Gibson continued working part-time whilst raising her family. In 1963 they emigrated to the United States, where she took up positions, first at the University of Pennsylvania. He succeeded (Sir) Hans Krebs as the Head of the Department of Biochemistry in 1955. In 1963 he left Sheffield to become a professor at the University of Pennsylvania. He was the Greater Philadelphia Professor at Cornell University, from 1965 to 1996. In 1982, he became a U.S. citizen.

== Research ==
=== Hemoglobin ===
Gibson started his career with studies of hemoglobin, and continued with much other work on heme proteins.

=== Medical and physiological work ===
In keeping with his medical qualifications, much of Gibson's early work had medical or physiological relevance.

=== Cooperativity ===
During the period when protein and enzyme cooperativity was at the center of biochemical interest Gibson studied it in the context of abnormal hemoglobins.

=== Rapid reactions ===
Gibson made major contributions to the development of methods for studying rapid reactions, and their application to hemoglobin.

=== Other proteins ===
Other work concerned enzymes such as "diaphorase", glucose oxidase, cytochrome oxidase and peroxidase.

=== Thermodynamics ===
Much of Gibson's work concerned questions of thermodynamics and equilibria, and in that context he participated in discussions about how to present thermodynamic data.

== Awards and honours ==
Gibson was elected a Fellow of the Royal Society in 1969. He was also a member of the National Academy of Sciences, and an associate editor of the Journal of Biological Chemistry from 1975 to 1994.
