= Woeseian revolution =

Three-domain tree of life

The Woeseian revolution was the progression of the phylogenetic tree of life concept from two main divisions, known as the Prokarya and Eukarya, into three domains now classified as Bacteria, Archaea, and Eukaryotes. The discovery of the new domain stemmed from the work of biophysicist Carl Woese in 1977 from a principle of evolutionary biology designated as Woese's dogma. It states that the evolution of ribosomal RNA (rRNA) was a necessary precursor to the evolution of modern life forms. Although the three-domain system has been widely accepted, the initial introduction of Woese’s discovery received criticism from the scientific community.

== Phylogenetic implications ==
The basis of phylogenetics was limited by the technology of the time, which led to a greater dependence on phenotypic classification before advances that would allow for molecular organization methods. This was a major reason why the dichotomy of all living things being either animal or plant in nature was deemed an acceptable theory. Without truly understanding the genetic implication of each organismal classification in phylogenies via nucleic acid sequencing of shared molecular material, the phylogenetic tree of life and other such phylogenies would no doubt be incorrect. Woese’s advances in molecular sequencing and phylogenetic organization allowed for a better understanding of the three domains of life - the Bacteria, Archaea, and Eukaryotes. Regarding their varying types of shared rRNA, the small subunit rRNA was deemed as the best molecule to sequence to distinguish phylogenetic relationships because of its relatively small size, ease of isolation, and universal distribution.

== Controversy ==
This reorganization caused an initial pushback: it wasn't accepted until nearly a decade after its publication. Possible factors that led to initial criticisms of his discovery included Woese's oligonucleotide cataloging, of which he was one of "only two or three people in the world" to be able to execute this method, let alone read the films. Further, Woese's background was in physics, whereas most of the research was being done in microbiology.
