= James Kasting =

American geoscientist

James Fraser Kasting
- Born: 2 January 1953 (age 73)
- Education: Harvard University, University of Michigan
- Scientific career
- Fields: Geoscience
- Workplaces: Penn State University
- Doctoral advisor: Tom Donahue
- Website: http://www.geosc.psu.edu/~kasting/PersonalPage/Kasting.htm

External videos
- James Kasting, Origins 2011 congress

James Fraser Kasting (born January 2, 1953) is an American geoscientist and Distinguished Professor of Geosciences at Penn State University. Kasting is active in NASA's search for habitable extrasolar planets. He is considered a world leader in the field of planetary habitability, assessing habitable zones around stars. He was elected a member of the National Academy of Sciences in 2018. Kasting also serves on the Advisory Council of METI (Messaging Extraterrestrial Intelligence).

== Education ==
Kasting grew up in Huntsville, Alabama, and credits the nearby Marshall Space Flight Center and the Mercury, Gemini, and Apollo rockets for inspiring his interests in space and science.

Kasting received an A.B. from Harvard University in 1975. He then went to the University of Michigan, where he worked with Tom Donahue, receiving his M.S. in physics and atmospheric science in 1978, and his Ph.D. in atmospheric science in 1979.

== Research ==
Kasting worked as a postdoctoral fellow at the National Center for Atmospheric Research and at NASA Ames Research Center before accepting a position with the space science division at NASA Ames. He has served NASA in various capacities, including co-chairing the scientific working group for the Terrestrial Planet Finder. Kasting joined Penn State University in 1988, but continues to collaborate with NASA.

He is interested in atmospheric evolution, planetary atmospheres and paleoclimates. Kasting writes about the geophysical history and status of the Earth, with a focus on atmospherics. He was well known among the geologists for his ground breaking idea on the only long term negative feedback for the atmospheric carbon dioxides: the carbon silica cycle. Together with his PhD student Alex Pavlov, they put a decisive mark on the post-GOE (Great Oxidation Event) oxygen level of greater than 1E-5 Present Atmospheric Level. According to Kasting's calculations, the Earth's oceans will evaporate in about a billion years, while the Sun is still a main sequence star. This date is much earlier than previously thought. He has also considered the habitability criteria of other stellar systems and planets. A 1993 paper on habitable zones was particularly decisive in shaping thinking on this field.

Kasting has published two books, The Earth System, and How to Find a Habitable Planet, along with more than 140 publications in research journals. In their popular 2001 work Rare Earth:Why Complex Life is Uncommon in the Universe, Peter Ward and Donald Brownlee note: "Although many scientists have been doggedly pursuing the various attributes necessary for a habitable planet...one name stands out in the scientific literature: James Kasting."

Kasting is also a member of numerous professional scientific societies and committees. He was elected Fellow of both the American Academy of Arts and Sciences and Geochemical Society in 2008. He is also a fellow of the American Geophysical Union (2004), International Society for the Study of the Origin of Life (2002), and the American Association for the Advancement of Science (1995). He serves on the advisory board of the Lifeboat Foundation.

“Even if we search the cosmos and come up with a negative result, if we see a bunch of Earth-like planets and none of them have life, we’ll know we hold a very special place in the universe,” Kasting said. “But I was a fan of Carl Sagan growing up, and Sagan was much more optimistic than that. And I’m more optimistic also.”

== Awards ==
He won a LExEN Award for his work "Collaborative Research: Methanogenesis and the Climate of Early Mars". He won the Oparin Medal, presented by the International Society for the Study of the Origin of Life, in 2008.

- Stanley Miller Medal (2016)

== Personal life ==
He is married with three children.
