= Systematic and Applied Microbiology =

- Discipline: Microbiology
- Language: English
- Edited by: Karl-Heinz Schleifer, Rudolf Amann, Ramon Rosselló-Móra

Publication details
- History: 1983-present
- Publisher: Elsevier
- Frequency: Bimonthly
- Impact factor: 3.4 (2022)

Standard abbreviations
- ISO 4: Syst. Appl. Microbiol.

Indexing
- ISSN: 0723-2020
- OCLC no.: 51392980

Links
- Journal homepage

Systematic and Applied Microbiology is a peer-reviewed bimonthly journal deals with various aspects of microbial diversity and systematics of prokaryotes. It focuses on Bacteria and Archaea; eukaryotic microorganisms will only be considered in rare cases. According to the Journal Citation Reports, the journal has a 2022 impact factor of 3.4.
