= George E. Fox =

American astrobiologist

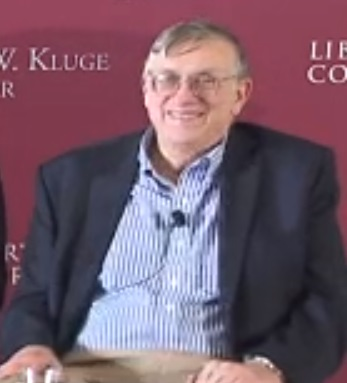
- Fox at the John W. Kluge Center at the Library of Congress in 2016
- Born: December 17, 1945 (age 80); United States
- Education: Syracuse University
- Scientific career
- Fields: Biology
- Workplaces: University of Houston

George Edward Fox (born December 17, 1945) is an astrobiologist, a Professor Emeritus and researcher at the University of Houston. He is an elected fellow of the American Academy of Microbiology, the American Association for the Advancement of Science, American Institute for Medical and Biological Engineering and the International Astrobiology Society. Fox received his B.S. degree in 1967, and completed his Ph.D. degree in 1974; both in chemical engineering at Syracuse University.

From the Fall of 1973 until 1977, Fox was a research associate with Carl R. Woese at the University of Illinois at Urbana-Champaign. Their collaboration initially focused on 5S ribosomal RNA where they established the use of a comparative sequence approach to predict RNA secondary structure. Next, utilizing 16S ribosomal RNA finger printing technology developed in the Woese laboratory in large part by Mitchell Sogin, Fox and Woese discovered the third form of life now known as the Archaea.

It has been said that their 1977 paper "may be the most important paper ever in microbiology". This seminal paper is now considered to be a PNAS classic. Fox and Woese also introduced the idea of a progenote as a primordial entity in the evolution of life.

In the Fall of 1977, Fox moved on to the University of Houston and as a new Assistant Professor in Biochemical & Biophysical Sciences, continued to collaborate with Woese. This resulted in the 1980 publication of the "big tree", the first comprehensive tree of bacterial relationships. Fox also recognized the limitations that 16S rRNA sequences could provide when identifying closely related species and addressed the question of "How Close is Close?".

He became a full professor there in 1986. His current research centers around understanding the early evolution of life with particular interest in the origin and evolution of the ribosome. He has also assisted NASA scientists on multiple occasions in characterizing relevant microbial communities.

== See also ==
- Three-domain system Towards a natural system of organisms: proposal for the domains Archaea, Bacteria, and Eucarya

== Books describing discovery of Archaea ==
1. Quammen, D.(2018)."The Tangled Tree: A Radical New History of Life." Simon & Schuster ISBN 978-1-4767-7662-0. 2. Sapp, J. (2009)."The New Foundations of Evolution," Oxford University Press,ISBN 9780195388503.
