= Carl Woese =

American microbiologist (1928–2012)

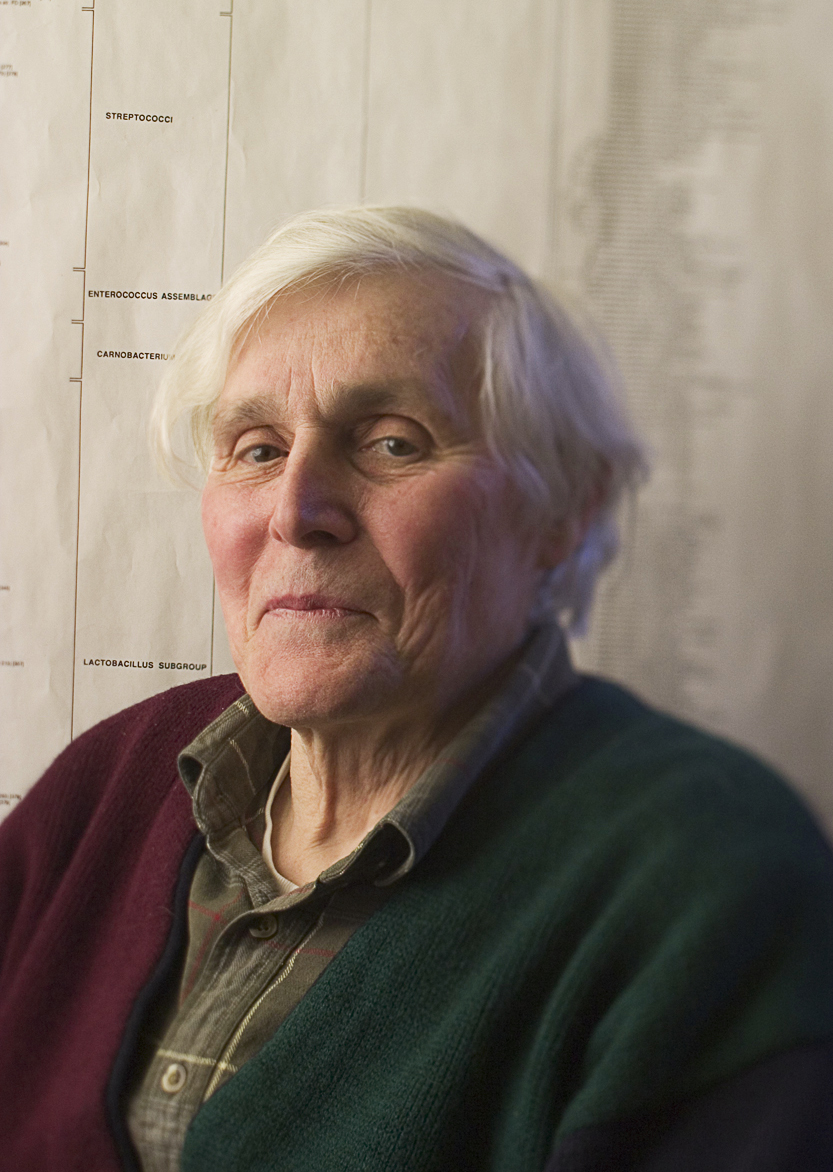
- Woese in 2004
- Born: July 15, 1928; Syracuse, New York, U.S.
- Died: December 30, 2012 (aged 84); Urbana, Illinois, U.S.
- Education: Amherst College; Yale University
- Known for: Recognition of Archaea as a domain of life
- Awards: Leeuwenhoek Medal (1992); Selman A. Waksman Award (1995); National Medal of Science (2000); Crafoord Prize (2003)
- Scientific career
- Fields: Microbiology
- Workplaces: University of Illinois Urbana–Champaign
- Thesis: Physical Studies on Animal viruses (1953)
- Doctoral advisor: Ernest C. Pollard
- Notable students: David Stahl

Carl Richard Woese (/woʊz/ WOHZ; July 15, 1928 – December 30, 2012) was an American microbiologist and biophysicist. Woese defined the Archaea (a new domain of life) in 1977 through a pioneering phylogenetic taxonomy of 16S ribosomal RNA, a technique that has revolutionized microbiology. He also originated the RNA world hypothesis in 1967, although not by that name. Woese held the Stanley O. Ikenberry Chair and was professor of microbiology at the University of Illinois Urbana–Champaign.

== Life and education ==
Woese was born in Syracuse, New York on July 15, 1928. His family was German American. Woese attended Deerfield Academy in Massachusetts. He received a bachelor's degree in mathematics and physics from Amherst College in 1950. During his time at Amherst, Woese took only one biology course (Biochemistry, in his senior year) and had "no scientific interest in plants and animals" until advised by William M. Fairbank, then an assistant professor of physics at Amherst, to pursue biophysics at Yale.

In 1953, he completed a PhD in biophysics at Yale University, where his doctoral research focused on the inactivation of viruses by heat and ionizing radiation. He studied medicine at the University of Rochester for two years. Then he became a postdoctoral researcher in biophysics at Yale University investigating bacterial spores. From 1960 to 1963, he worked as a biophysicist at the General Electric Research Laboratory in Schenectady, New York. In 1964, Woese joined the microbiology faculty of the University of Illinois Urbana–Champaign, where he focused on Archaea, genomics, and molecular evolution as his areas of expertise. He became a professor at the University of Illinois Urbana–Champaign's Carl R. Woese Institute for Genomic Biology, which was renamed in his honor in 2015, after his death.

Woese died on December 30, 2012, following complications from pancreatic cancer, leaving as survivors his wife Gabriella and a son and daughter.

== Work and discoveries ==
=== Early work on the genetic code ===
Woese turned his attention to the genetic code while setting up his lab at General Electric's Knolls Laboratory in the fall of 1960. Interest among physicists and molecular biologists had begun to coalesce around deciphering the correspondence between the twenty amino acids and the four letter alphabet of nucleic acid bases in the decade following James D. Watson, Francis Crick, and Rosalind Franklin's discovery of the structure of DNA in 1953. Woese published a series of papers on the topic. In one, he deduced a correspondence table between what was then known as "soluble RNA" and DNA based upon their respective base pair ratios. He then re-evaluated experimental data associated with the hypothesis that viruses used one base, rather than a triplet, to encode each amino acid, and suggested 18 codons, correctly predicting one for proline. Other work established the mechanistic basis of protein translation, but in Woese's view, largely overlooked the genetic code's evolutionary origins as an afterthought.

In 1962, Woese spent several months as a visiting researcher at the Pasteur Institute in Paris, a locus of intense activity on the molecular biology of gene expression and gene regulation. While in Paris, he met Sol Spiegelman, who invited Woese to visit the University of Illinois after hearing his research goals; at this visit Spiegelman offered Woese a position with immediate tenure beginning in the fall of 1964. With the freedom to patiently pursue more speculative threads of inquiry outside the mainstream of biological research, Woese began to consider the genetic code in evolutionary terms, asking how the codon assignments and their translation into an amino acid sequence might have evolved.

=== Discovery of the third domain ===
For much of the 20th century, prokaryotes were regarded as a single group of organisms and classified based on their biochemistry, morphology and metabolism. In a highly influential 1962 paper, Roger Stanier and C. B. van Niel first established the division of cellular organization into prokaryotes and eukaryotes, defining prokaryotes as those organisms lacking a cell nucleus. Adapted from Édouard Chatton's generalization, Stanier and Van Niel's concept was quickly accepted as the most important distinction among organisms; yet they were nevertheless skeptical of microbiologists' attempts to construct a natural phylogenetic classification of bacteria. However, it became generally assumed that all life shared a common prokaryotic (implied by the Greek root πρό (pro-), before, in front of) ancestor.

In 1977, Woese and George E. Fox experimentally disproved this universally held hypothesis about the basic structure of the tree of life. Woese and Fox discovered a kind of microbial life which they called the “archaebacteria” (Archaea). They reported that the archaebacteria comprised "a third kingdom" of life as distinct from bacteria as plants and animals. Having defined Archaea as a new "urkingdom" (later domain) which were neither bacteria nor eukaryotes, Woese redrew the taxonomic tree. His three-domain system, based on phylogenetic relationships rather than obvious morphological similarities, divided life into 23 main divisions, incorporated within three domains: Bacteria, Archaea, and Eucarya.

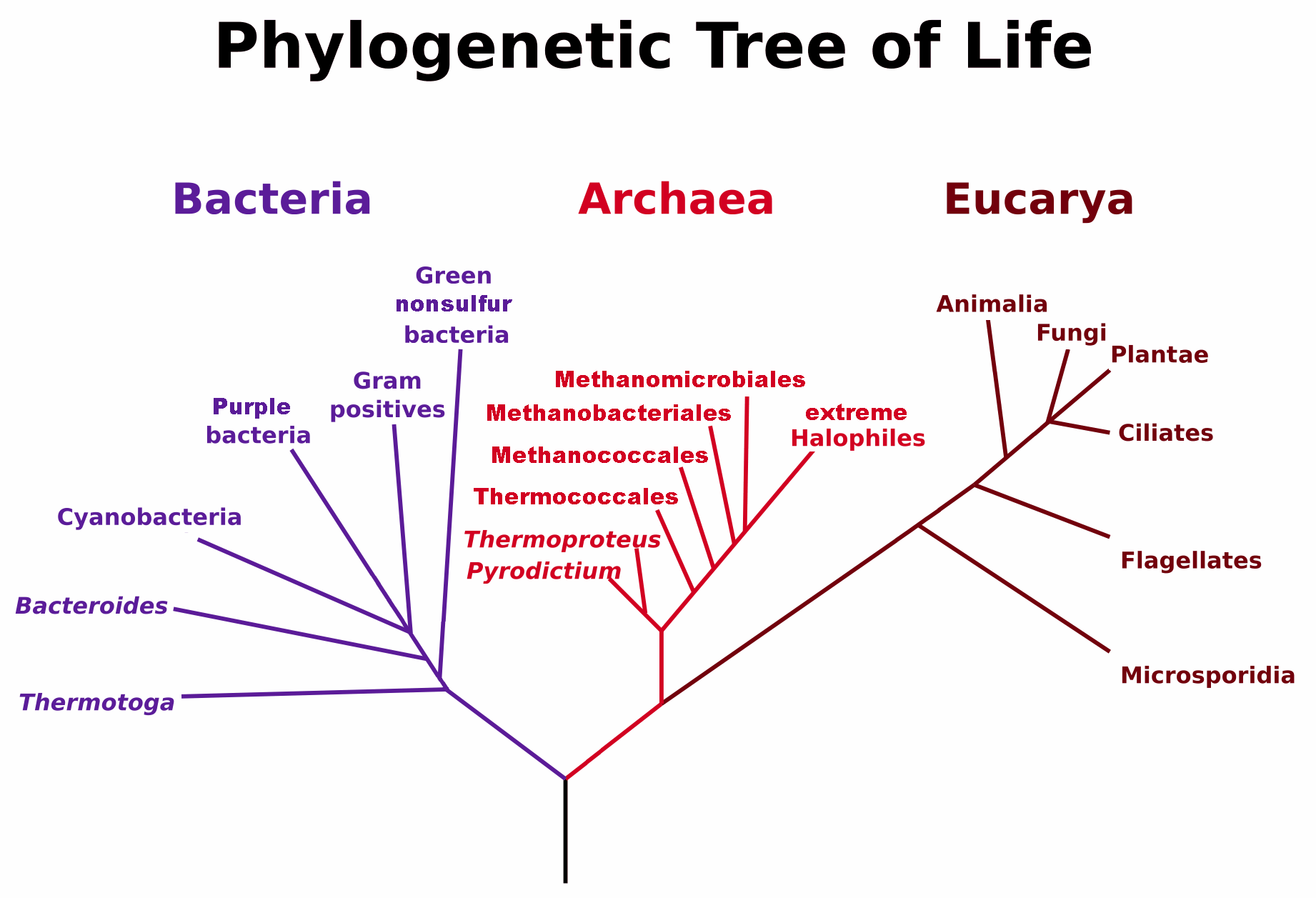
Phylogenetic tree based on Woese et al. rRNA analysis. The vertical line at bottom represents the last universal common ancestor (LUCA).

Acceptance of the validity of Woese's phylogenetically valid classification was a slow process. Prominent biologists including Salvador Luria and Ernst Mayr objected to his division of the prokaryotes. Not all criticism of him was restricted to the scientific level. A decade of labor-intensive oligonucleotide cataloging left him with a reputation as "a crank," and Woese would go on to be dubbed as "Microbiology's Scarred Revolutionary" by a news article printed in the journal Science. The growing body of supporting data led the scientific community to accept the Archaea by the mid-1980s. Today, few scientists cling to the idea of a unified Prokarya.

Woese's work on Archaea is also significant in its implications for the search for life on other planets. Before the discovery by Woese and Fox, scientists thought that Archaea were extreme organisms that evolved from the microorganisms more familiar to us. Now, most believe they are ancient, and may have robust evolutionary connections to the first organisms on Earth. Organisms similar to those archaea that exist in extreme environments may have developed on other planets, some of which harbor conditions conducive to extremophile life.

Notably, Woese's elucidation of the tree of life shows the diversity of microbial lineages: single-celled organisms represent the vast majority of the biosphere's genetic, metabolic, and ecologic niche diversity. As microbes are crucial for biogeochemical cycles and to the continued function of the biosphere, Woese's research on how microbes evolve and their different types has provided data used by ecologists and conservationists. It was a major contribution to the theory of evolution and to our knowledge of the history of life.

Woese wrote, "My evolutionary concerns center on the bacteria and the archaea, whose evolutions cover most of the planet's 4.5-billion-year history. Using ribosomal RNA sequence as an evolutionary measure, my laboratory has reconstructed the phylogeny of both groups, and thereby provided a phylogenetically valid system of classification for prokaryotes. The discovery of the archaea was in fact a product of these studies".

=== Evolution of primary cell types ===
Woese also speculated about an era of rapid evolution in which considerable horizontal gene transfer occurred between organisms. First described by Woese and Fox in a 1977 paper and explored further with microbiologist Jane Gibson in a 1980 paper, these organisms, or progenotes, were imagined as protocells with very low complexity due to their error-prone translation apparatus ("noisy genetic transmission channel"), which produced high mutation rates that limited the specificity of cellular interaction and the size of the genome. This early translation apparatus would have produced a group of structurally similar, functionally equivalent proteins, rather than a single protein. Furthermore, because of this reduced specificity, all cellular components were susceptible to horizontal gene transfer, and rapid evolution occurred at the level of the ecosystem.

The transition to modern cells (the "Darwinian Threshold") occurred when organisms evolved translation mechanisms with modern levels of fidelity: improved performance allowed cellular organization to reach a level of complexity and connectedness that made genes from other organisms much less able to displace an individual's own genes.

In later years, Woese's work concentrated on genomic analysis to elucidate the significance of horizontal gene transfer (HGT) for evolution. He worked on detailed analyses of the phylogenies of the aminoacyl-tRNA synthetases and on the effect of horizontal gene transfer on the distribution of those key enzymes among organisms. The goal of the research was to explain how the primary cell types (the archaeal, eubacterial, and eukaryotic) evolved from an ancestral state in the RNA world.

== Perspectives on biology ==
Woese shared his thoughts on the past, present, and future of biology in Current Biology:

The "important questions" that 21st century biology faces all stem from a single question, the nature and generation of biological organization. . . . Yes, Darwin is back, but in the company of . . . scientists who can see much further into the depths of biology than was possible heretofore. It is no longer a "10,000 species of birds" view of evolution—evolution seen as a procession of forms. The concern is now with the process of evolution itself.

I see the question of biological organization taking two prominent directions today. The first is the evolution of (proteinaceous) cellular organization, which includes sub-questions such as the evolution of the translation apparatus and the genetic code, and the origin and nature of the hierarchies of control that fine-tune and precisely interrelate the panoply of cellular processes that constitute cells. It also includes the question of the number of different basic cell types that exist on earth today: did all modern cells come from a single ancestral cellular organization?

The second major direction involves the nature of the global ecosystem. . . . Bacteria are the major organisms on this planet—in numbers, in total mass, in importance to the global balances. Thus, it is microbial ecology that . . . is most in need of development, both in terms of facts needed to understand it, and in terms of the framework in which to interpret them.

Woese considered biology to have an "all-important" role in society. In his view, biology should serve a broader purpose than the pursuit of "an engineered environment":

What was formally recognized in physics needs now to be recognized in biology: science serves a dual function. On the one hand it is society's servant, attacking the applied problems posed by society. On the other hand, it functions as society's teacher, helping the latter to understand its world and itself. It is the latter function that is effectively missing today.

== Honors and scientific legacy ==
Woese was a MacArthur Fellow in 1984, was made a member of the National Academy of Sciences in 1988, received the Leeuwenhoek Medal (microbiology's highest honor) in 1992, the Selman A. Waksman Award in Microbiology in 1995 from the National Academy of Sciences, and was a National Medal of Science recipient in 2000. In 2003, he received the Crafoord Prize from the Royal Swedish Academy of Sciences "for his discovery of a third domain of life". He was elected to the American Philosophical Society in 2004. In 2006, he was made a foreign member of the Royal Society.

Many microbial species, such as Pyrococcus woesei, Methanobrevibacter woesei, and Conexibacter woesei, are named in his honor.

Microbiologist Justin Sonnenburg of Stanford University said "The 1977 paper is one of the most influential in microbiology and arguably, all of biology. It ranks with the works of Watson and Crick and Darwin, providing an evolutionary framework for the incredible diversity of the microbial world".

With regard to Woese's work on horizontal gene transfer as a primary evolutionary process, Professor Norman R. Pace of the University of Colorado at Boulder said, "I think Woese has done more for biology writ large than any biologist in history, including Darwin... There's a lot more to learn, and he's been interpreting the emerging story brilliantly".

== Selected publications ==
=== Books ===
- Woese, Carl (1967). The Genetic Code: the Molecular Basis for Genetic Expression. New York: Harper & Row. OCLC 293697.

=== Selected articles ===
- Woese, Carl R.; George E. Fox (1977). "Phylogenetic structure of the prokaryotic domain: the primary kingdoms". Proceedings of the National Academy of Sciences of the United States of America. 74 (11): 5088–5090. Bibcode:1977PNAS...74.5088W. doi:10.1073/pnas.74.11.5088. ISSN 0027-8424. PMC 432104. PMID 270744.
- Woese, Carl R. (June 1, 1987). "Bacterial evolution". Microbiological Reviews. 51 (2): 221–271. doi:10.1128/MMBR.51.2.221-271.1987. PMC 373105. PMID 2439888.
- Woese, Carl R.; O Kandler; M L Wheelis (1990). "Towards a natural system of organisms: proposal for the domains Archaea, Bacteria, and Eucarya". Proceedings of the National Academy of Sciences of the United States of America. 87 (12): 4576–4579. Bibcode:1990PNAS...87.4576W. doi:10.1073/pnas.87.12.4576. ISSN 0027-8424. PMC 54159. PMID 2112744.
- Woese, Carl R. (June 1, 2004). "A New Biology for a New Century". Microbiology and Molecular Biology Reviews. 68 (2): 173–186. doi:10.1128/MMBR.68.2.173-186.2004. ISSN 1098-5557. PMC 419918. PMID 15187180.
- Woese, Carl R. (2005). "Evolving biological organization". In Jan Sapp (ed.). Microbial Phylogeny and Evolution:Concepts and Controversies: Concepts and Controversies. Oxford University Press. pp. 99–117. ISBN 9780198037774.
- Woese, Carl R. (2006). "How We Do, Don't and Should Look at Bacteria and Bacteriology". The Prokaryotes. pp. 3–23. doi:10.1007/0-387-30741-9_1. ISBN 978-0-387-30741-1.
- Woese, Carl R.; Nigel Goldenfeld (2009). "How the Microbial World Saved Evolution from the Scylla of Molecular Biology and the Charybdis of the Modern Synthesis". Microbiology and Molecular Biology Reviews. 73 (1): 14–21. doi:10.1128/MMBR.00002-09. PMC 2650883. PMID 19258530.

== See also ==
- Archaea
- Bacterial phyla, the major lineages of Bacteria
- George E. Fox
- Karl Stetter
- Norman R. Pace
- Otto Kandler
- Phylogenetics
- Tree of life (biology)
- 16S ribosomal RNA
- Woeseian revolution
- Woese's dogma
