= Norman R. Pace =

American biochemist (born 1942)

Norman Richard Pace Jr.
- Born: 1942 (age 83–84); Indiana, U.S.
- Education: Indiana University Bloomington; University of Illinois
- Known for: RNA Processing
- Scientific career
- Fields: Biochemistry, Microbiology
- Institutions: National Jewish Hospital and Research Center; University of Colorado Medical Center; Indiana University; University of California, Berkeley; University of Colorado at Boulder
- Thesis: In vitro studies of viral RNA replication (1967)
- Doctoral advisor: Sol Spiegelman
- Other academic advisors: Dean Fraser (IU)
- Notable students: W. Ford Doolittle (post doc); David A. Stahl (post doc)
- Website: pacelab.colorado.edu/PI_NormPace.html

Norman Richard Pace Jr. (born 1942) is an American biochemist, and is Distinguished Professor Emeritus of Molecular, Cellular and Developmental Biology at the University of Colorado. He is principal investigator at the Pace lab.

== Early life and education ==
Pace was born and raised in rural Indiana. When he was a high school student, Pace attended a summer science program at Indiana University in which he worked in the laboratory of microbiologist Dean Fraser. His participation led to a co-authorship on a scientific paper.

He graduated with honors in 1964 from Indiana University Bloomington with an A.B., and later from the University of Illinois in 1967 with a Ph.D. At Illinois, Pace worked under the guidance of Sol Spiegelman. After receiving his PhD in 1967, Pace remained at Illinois for the next two years as a post doctoral fellow.

== Career ==
In 1969, Pace moved to Denver and simultaneously held teaching positions at both the National Jewish Hospital and Research Center and the University of Colorado Medical Center for three years as an assistant professor of biophysics and genetics. In 1975, Pace was promoted to associate professor of biophysics and genetics at the University of Colorado Medical Center and he dropped his affiliation with the National Jewish Hospital. In 1982, Pace was promoted to a full professor of biochemistry, biophysics, and genetics.

In 1984, he moved to Indiana University as a professor of biology and was named distinguished professor of biology in 1992. In 1994 he was named distinguished professor of biology and chemistry.

In 1996, Pace moved to University of California, Berkeley as a professor of plant and microbial biology, and molecular and cell biology for a stay of three years before being recruited to the University of Colorado, Boulder, in 1999 as a professor of molecular, cellular and developmental biology (MCDB). He was named distinguished professor of MDCB in 2008.

He was bestowed with an honorary Doctor of Science degree from Indiana University on May 4, 2018, and gave the inaugural Norman R. Pace Lecture on May 7, 2018.

He has worked with the NASA Astrobiology Institute.

== Research ==
Pace's research involved the synthesis, structure, and function of RNA and the application of molecular biology tools to problems in environmental microbial biology. Particularly this was the ability to study microbes that weren't easy to culture in the lab, by extracting nucleic acids (DNA and RNA) from environmental samples. This work is regarded as the beginning of metagenomic analysis, a new approach in studying organisms.

== Personal life ==
Pace married, divorced, and later remarried Bernadette Pace, a PhD microbiologist and a professional trapeze artist. He's also an avid caver, receiving the Lew Bicking Award in 1987.

== Awards ==
- 1987 Lew Bicking Award
- 1991 Fellow of the American Academy of Arts and Sciences
- 1991 Member of the National Academy of Sciences
- 2001 Selman A. Waksman Award in Microbiology of the National Academy of Sciences
- 2001 MacArthur Fellows Program
- 2007 Abbott-American Society for Microbiology Lifetime Achievement Award
- 2008 RNA Society Lifetime Achievement Award
- 2008 International Society of Microbial Ecology Tiedje Award for Lifetime Achievement
- 2017 Massry Prize
- 2018 Honorary Doctor of Science degree from Indiana University
- 2019 Stanley Miller Medal
