= David Stahl (biologist) =

David A. Stahl
- Citizenship: American
- Education: University of Washington; University of Illinois
- Known for: Environmental microbiology
- Awards: Member, National Academy of Engineers
- Scientific career
- Fields: Environmental microbiology
- Workplaces: University of Illinois; Northwestern University; University of Washington
- Academic advisors: Carl Woese

David A. Stahl is an American scientist and professor of Environmental Engineering. He is best known for the application of molecular microbial ecology to environmental engineering.

== Biography ==
Stahl received his B.S. in microbiology from the University of Washington, cum laude, in 1971. He earned his M.S. and his Ph.D. in microbiology at the University of Illinois Urbana-Champaign in 1975 and 1978, respectively. From 1978 to 1980, he completed postdoctoral training at the National Jewish Hospital and Research Center, where he was a Senior Research Associate from 1980 to 1984. From 1984 to 1994, he was on the faculty of the University of Illinois. From 1994 to 2000, he was on the faculty of Northwestern University. Since 2000, he has been a member of the faculty of the University of Washington.

Stahl is a Fellow of the American Academy of Microbiology. He was elected to the National Academy of Engineering in 2012. He was the editor of FEMS Microbiology Letters from 1990 to 1996, editor of Biodegradation from 1997 to 2003, editor of Microbiology and Molecular Biology Reviews from 1998 to 2003, and founding co-editor of Environmental Microbiology from 1998 to 2012. In 2006, Stahl was awarded the Procter & Gamble Award in Applied and Environmental Microbiology by the American Society for Microbiology.
