= Günter Wächtershäuser =

German chemist turned patent lawyer (born 1938)

Günter Wächtershäuser (born 1938 in Gießen) is a German chemist turned patent lawyer who is widely known for his work on the origin of life, and in particular his iron-sulfur world theory, a theory that life on Earth has hydrothermal origins. The hypothesis proposes that early life may have formed on the surface of iron sulfide minerals, hence the name. It was developed by retrodiction from extant biochemistry in conjunction with chemical experiments. The theory is consistent with the hypothesis that life originated near seafloor hydrothermal vents. He was encouraged and supported by science philosopher Karl R. Popper to publish his ideas.

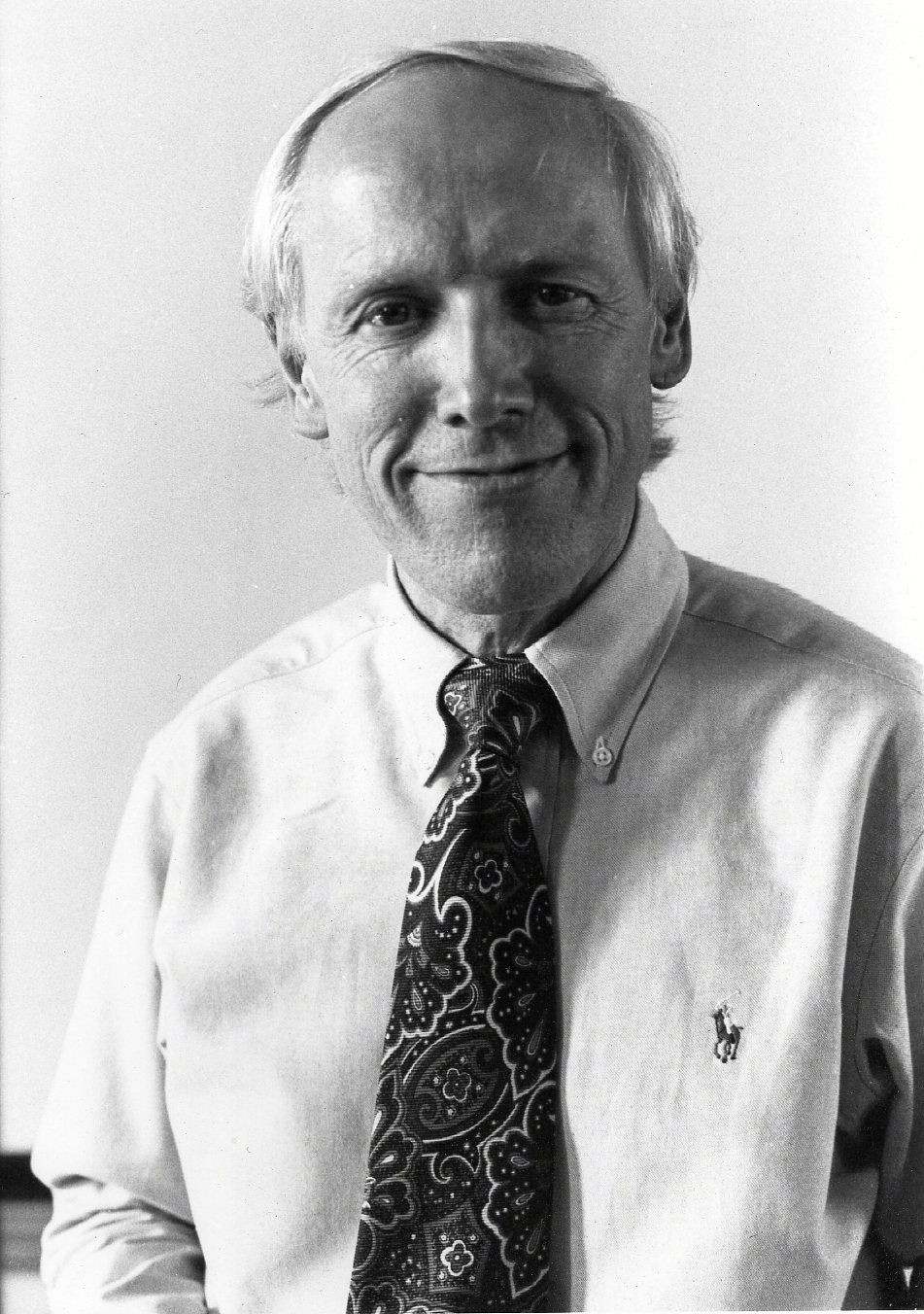

== Biographical background ==
Wächtershäuser, a chemist by training, has been an international patent lawyer in Munich since 1970. He has published numerous articles in organic chemistry, genetic engineering and patent law, and has made contributions to evolutionary theory concerning the origins of perception and cognition, and the origin of life.

== "Metabolism first" ==
One of the key ideas advanced by Wächtershäuser is that an early form of metabolism predated genetics. Metabolism here means a cycle of chemical reactions that produce energy in a form that can be harnessed by other processes. The idea is that once a primitive metabolic cycle was established, it began to produce ever more complex compounds. His model is known as the iron-sulfur world theory by analogy with the RNA world hypothesis.

== Awards ==
In 1993, Wächtershäuser received the annual award of the Bavarian Academy of Sciences and the following year he was made an honorary professor at the University of Regensburg. In 1999, Wächtershäuser received the Bonn Chemistry Award and in 2008 he was made an adjunct professor at the University of North Carolina at Chapel Hill.

== Publications ==
- Evolution of the First Metabolic Cycles. Proceedings of the National Academy of Sciences 87, January 1990, 200–204
- The origin of life and its methodological challenge. J Theor Biol 187, 1997, 483–494.
- Origin of Life: Life as We Don’t Know It. In: Science 289(5483), 25. August 2000, S. 1307–1308
- From pre-cells to Eukarya – a tale of two lipids. In: Molecular Microbiology 47(1), January 2003, 13–22, doi:10.1046/j.1365-2958.2003.03267.x
- From volcanic origins of chemoautotrophic life to Bacteria, Archaea and Eukarya. In: Philosophical transactions of the Royal Society of London. Series B, Biological sciences 361(1474), 29. October 2006, 1787–1808, doi:10.1098/rstb.2006.1904
- The Place of RNA in the Origin and Early Evolution of the Genetic Machinery. Life 4, 19. December 2014, 1050–1091, doi:10.3390/life4041050
- In Praise of Error. In: Journal of Molecular Evolution 82, 14. January 2016, 75–80, doi:10.1007/s00239-015-9727-3
