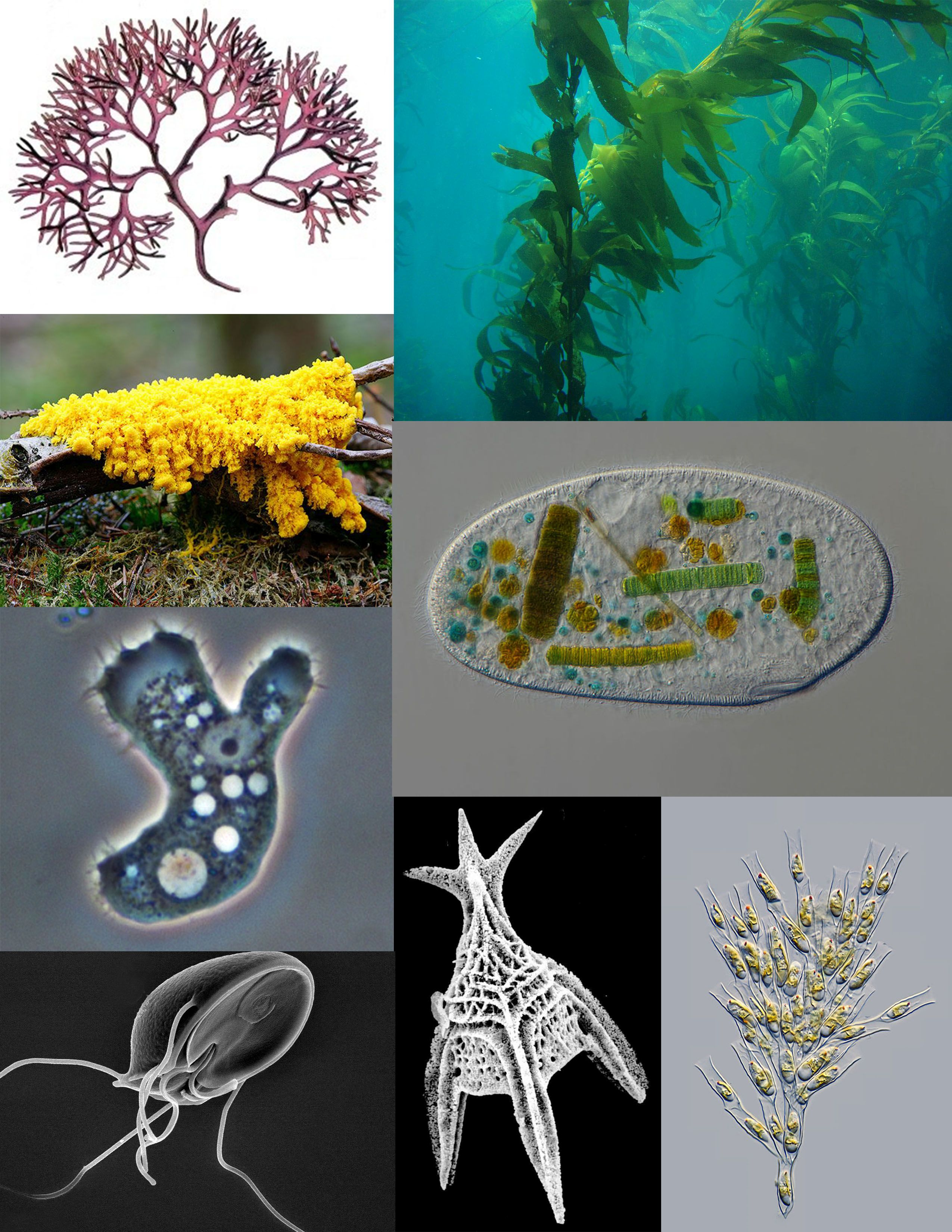
- Examples of protists. Clockwise from top left: red algae, kelp, ciliate, golden algae, dinoflagellate, metamonad, amoeba, slime mold.

Scientific classification
- Domain: Eukaryota

Major subdivisions
- Amorphea; Amoebozoa; Obazoa (including animals and fungi); Ancyromonadida; CRuMs; Discoba; Malawimonadida; Metamonada; Diaphoretickes; Archaeplastida (including land plants); Pancryptista; Disparia; Haptista; Telonemia; SAR; Stramenopiles; Alveolata; Rhizaria

Eukaryotes that are not considered protists
- Animalia; Fungi; Embryophyta (land plants)

= Protist =

Protists Temporal range: Paleoproterozoic–present

Eukaryotes other than animals, plants or fungi

A protist (/ˈproʊtɪst/ PROH-tist) or protoctist is any eukaryotic organism that is not an animal, land plant, or fungus. Protists do not form a natural group, or clade, but are a paraphyletic group encompassing the entire eukaryote tree of life, from which land plants, animals, and fungi evolved. They are primarily single-celled, exhibiting a wide range of forms such as amoebae, ciliates, thick-walled microalgae and, more commonly, flagellates. Several transitions to multicellularity have occurred among protists, from colonies with alternating cell types to giant slime molds, fungus-like organisms, and seaweeds with differentiated tissues.

Protists were historically regarded as a separate taxonomic kingdom known as Protista or Protoctista, or were lumped together as part of the traditional plant and animal kingdoms as algae and protozoa, respectively. With the advent of molecular phylogenetics and electron microscopy studies, some protists were shown to be more closely related to animals or plants than to other protists, and algae were found to be intermixed with protozoa. The classification suffered major revisions, as seemingly unrelated forms were found to be evolutionarily related, and vice versa.

In modern classifications, protists are spread across several large clades known as supergroups, many of them containing disparate forms. For example, the Archaeplastida includes mostly phototrophs like red and green algae, from which land plants evolved. Opisthokonta groups fungi, animals, and their single-celled relatives. Amoebozoa and Rhizaria harbor the majority of amoeboid organisms, such as testate amoebae, foraminifers and radiolarians. Stramenopiles and Alveolata are diverse groups of flagellates, many of which have evolved into major parasites (e.g., oomycetes, apicomplexans) or phototrophs (diatoms, brown algae, dinoflagellates). The earliest diverging groups, collectively known as Excavata (e.g., euglenids, metamonads), are flagellates that represent the ancestral traits of the last eukaryotic common ancestor (LECA). Despite the comparatively low number of described species, protists compose the majority of eukaryotic diversity as indicated by environmental DNA studies. Most protists are yet undescribed.

Protists encompass almost all of the biological traits seen in eukaryotes, and many exhibit unique adaptations. These include a range of nutritional modes through specialized feeding structures (phagotrophy, osmotrophy, myzocytosis) or chloroplasts (phototrophy), often mixing both as mixotrophy. Cellular respiration also varies due to modifications of their mitochondria. Almost all protists have a complex cytoskeleton composed of relatively conserved structures across evolution, namely a flagellar apparatus with basal bodies from which microtubules emerge and support the remaining cellular structures. Many protists have unique organelles that serve other functions, such as contractile vacuoles for homeostasis, or eyespots for light perception. Protist cells tend to host symbionts such as bacteria and archaea, usually to support their metabolism and nutrition. Although traditionally presumed to be asexual, protists are capable of sexual reproduction, and can exhibit diverse and complex life cycles with different generations and life stages.

Protists are abundantly present in all ecosystems, including extreme habitats, as important components of the biogeochemical cycles and trophic webs. As producers, they are responsible for a large portion of global primary production and carbon fixation. As consumers and decomposers, they regulate fungal and bacterial populations, and release nutrients to other trophic levels. Some form mutualistic relationships with other protists or animals such as corals and termites. Others are important parasites. Pathogenic protists cause many well-known human and animal diseases such as malaria and toxoplasmosis, or significant plant diseases like clubroot and potato blight. Free-living protists can also negatively impact aquatic life as harmful algal blooms.

The early evolution of protists corresponds with the evolution of eukaryotes, which split from archaea around 3 billion years ago and eventually gave rise to a common ancestor (LECA) with essential traits such as mitochondria and a complex endomembrane system, some time during the Paleo- or Mesoproterozoic eras. In the gap between these two events, fossils are often interpreted as stem-group eukaryotes, with intermediate traits. Following the appearance of LECA, its descendants (crown-group eukaryotes) experienced a rapid diversification in the span of 300 million years that originated the modern supergroups. Still, their abundance in the fossil record remained low until the Neoproterozoic, when the first fossils of opisthokonts, amoebae, and multicellular algae appear. Throughout the Phanerozoic, protists evolved into the forms that dominate ecosystems today, leaving an extensive fossil record of primarily siliceous and calcareous shells.

== Definition ==
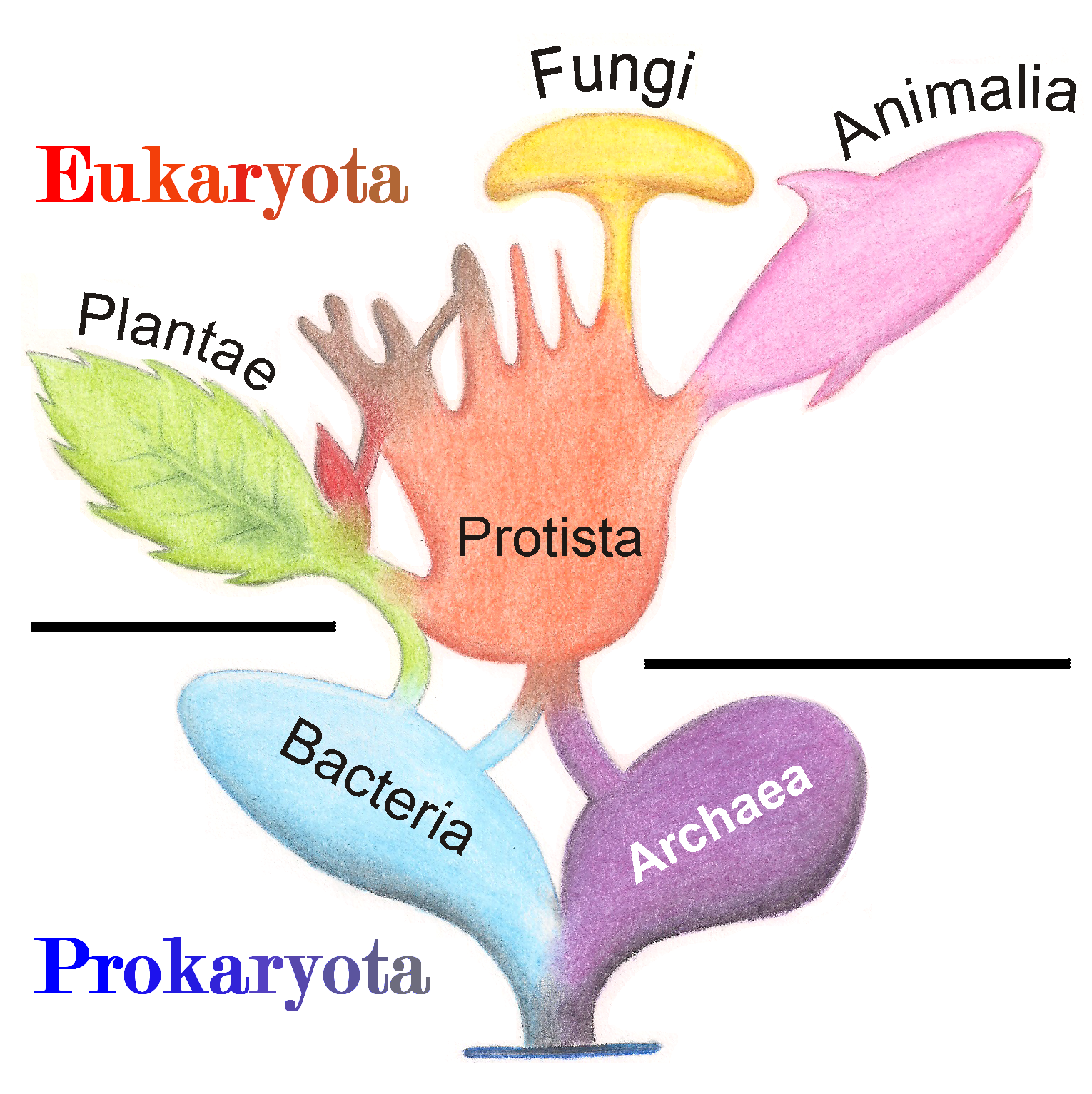
The tree of life showing the position of protists, from which all other eukaryotes evolved.

Protists are defined as all eukaryotes that are not animals, land plants or fungi, the three traditional "higher" kingdoms of eukaryotes. Because of this definition by exclusion, protists compose a paraphyletic group from which the ancestors of those three kingdoms evolved. As such, there is no unique trait that unifies all protists yet excludes non-protists. Still, together they exhibit a remarkable diversity of life cycles, trophic levels, modes of locomotion, and cellular structures that dwarfs those seen in "higher" eukaryotes. A less popular view is that protists are defined as exclusively single-celled eukaryotes, but this disregards the various transitions to multicellularity among protists.

The distinction between protists and other kingdoms was blurry before genetic analysis. Organisms that are unquestionably known as protists include a wide range of photosynthetic species, known as "algae", including various types of macroalgae that have a similar complexity to plants. Other protists have a fungus-like nutrition or appearance, such as the oomycetes. The remaining heterotrophic protists are often called "protozoa". Some minuscule animals (the myxozoans) and the "lower" fungi (namely the aphelids, rozellids and microsporidians, collectively the opisthosporidians) were traditionally classified as protists, and some algae (particularly red and green algae) were lumped with plants.

According to the current consensus, the label 'protist' specifically excludes animals, embryophytes (land plants)—meaning that all eukaryotic algae fall under this label—and all fungi. Opisthosporidians are considered part of a larger fungal kingdom, although they are studied by protistologists and mycologists alike.

== Morphology ==
Protists exist in diverse shapes and sizes. While most are single-celled, others have evolved various forms of multicellularity, ranging from simple colonies of cells to large, complex organisms like giant kelp and slime molds. Single-celled protists are traditionally grouped by their shape and how they move, into four broad categories.

Examples of unicellular protists

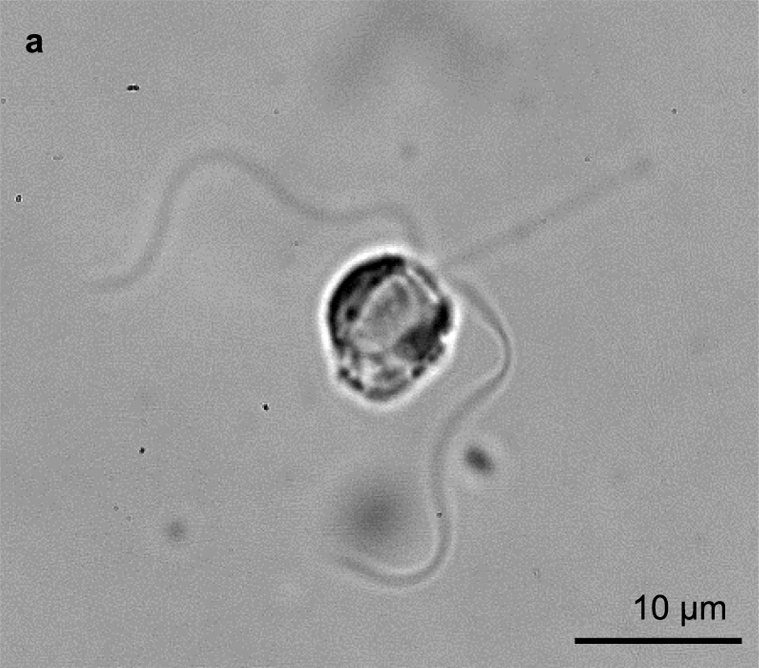
Prymnesium,
a flagellated alga

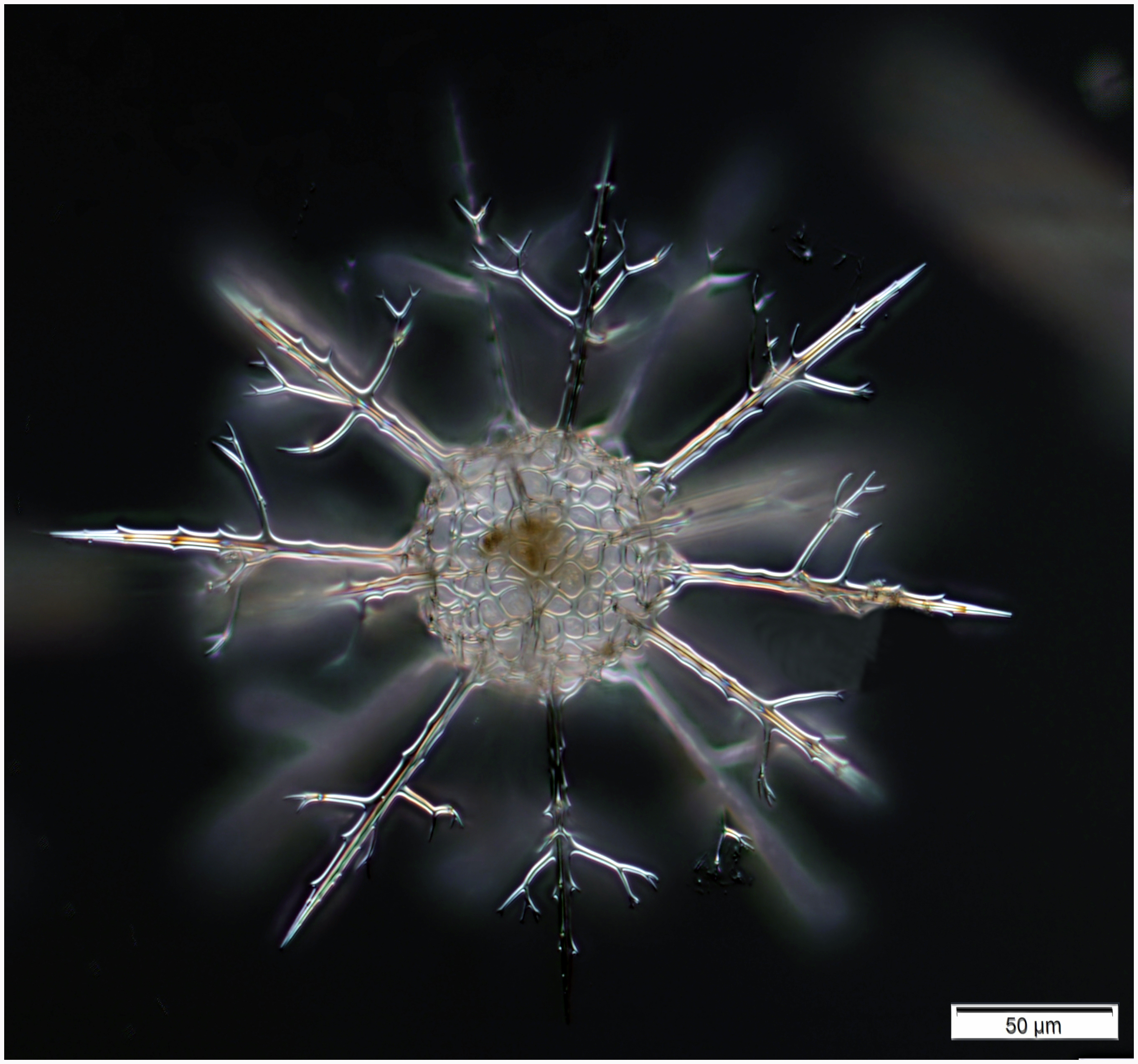
Cladococcus,
a radiolarian

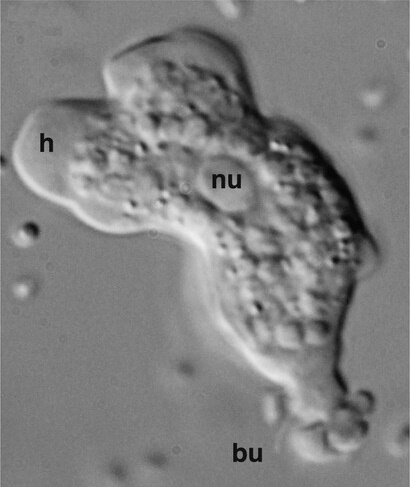
Naegleria, an amoeboflagellate

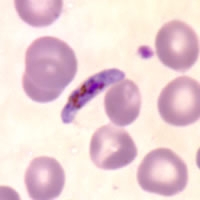
Plasmodium,
a sporozoan

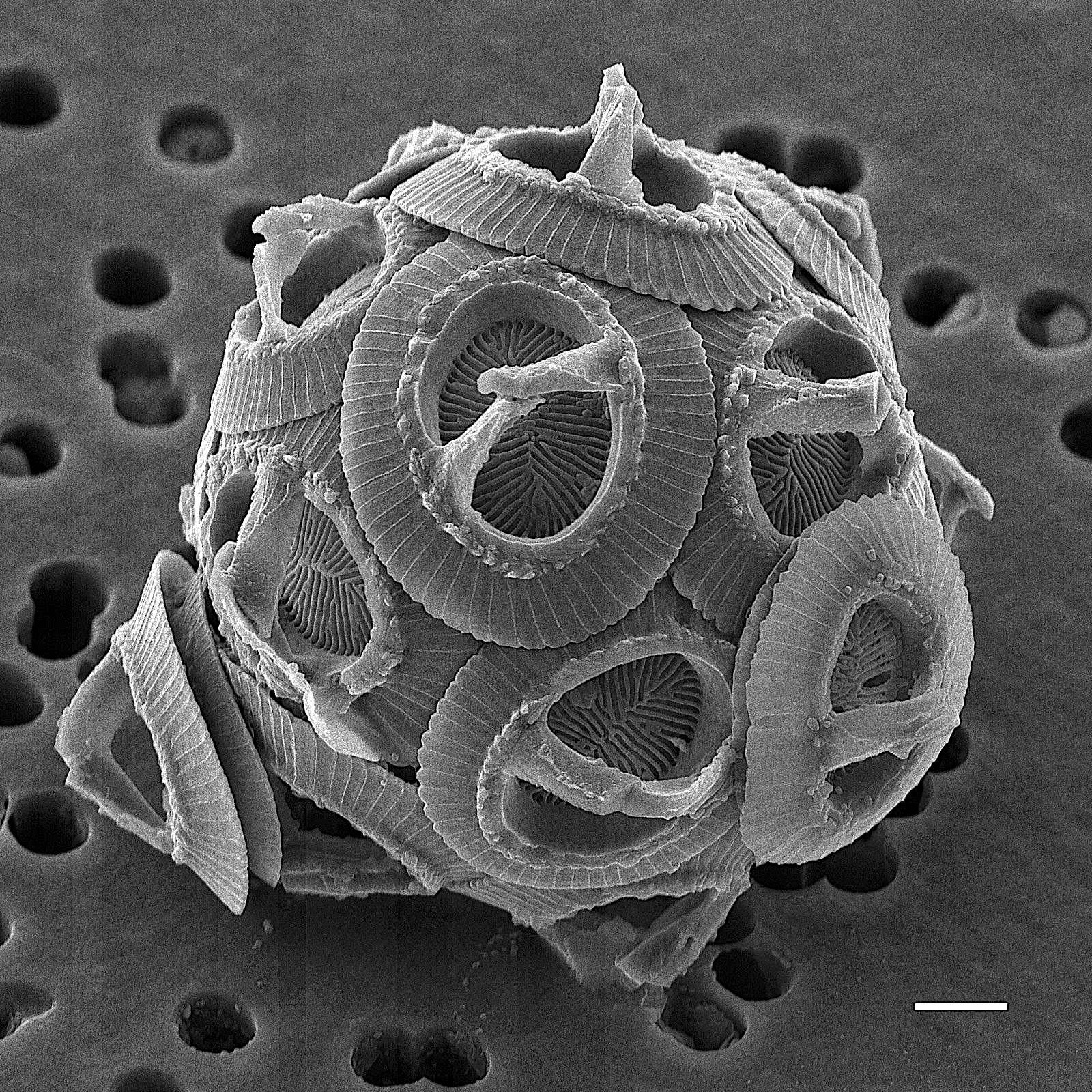
Gephyrocapsa,
a coccoid alga

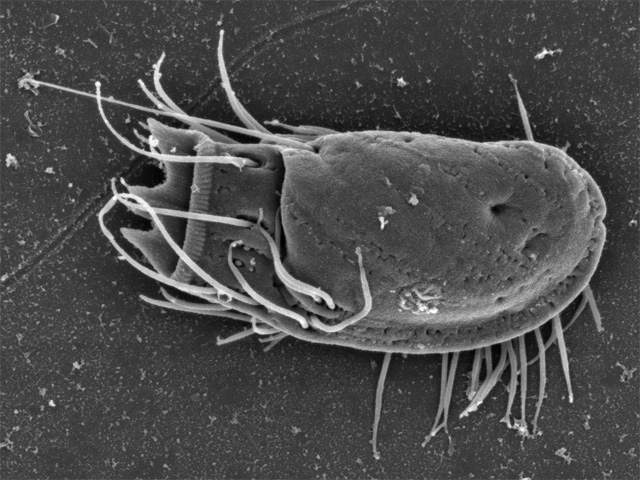
Stephanopogon,
a multiflagellate

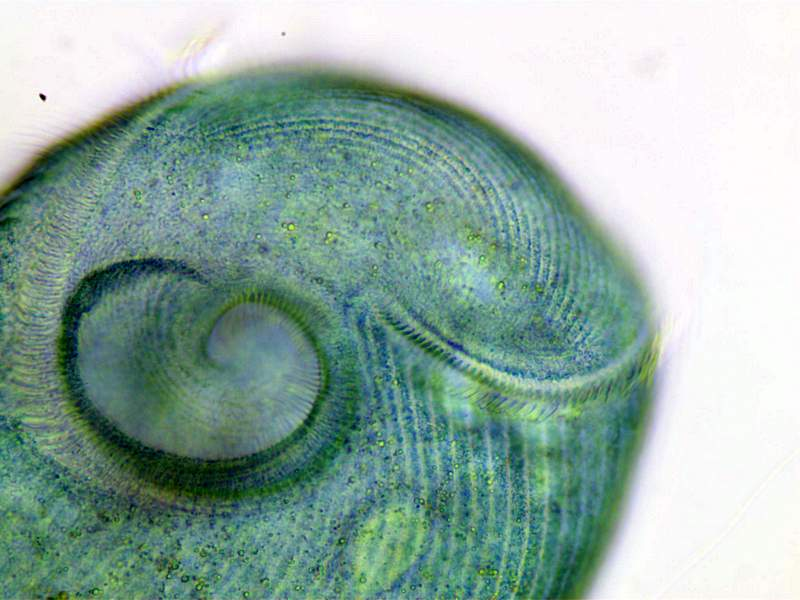
Closeup of the ciliate Stentor

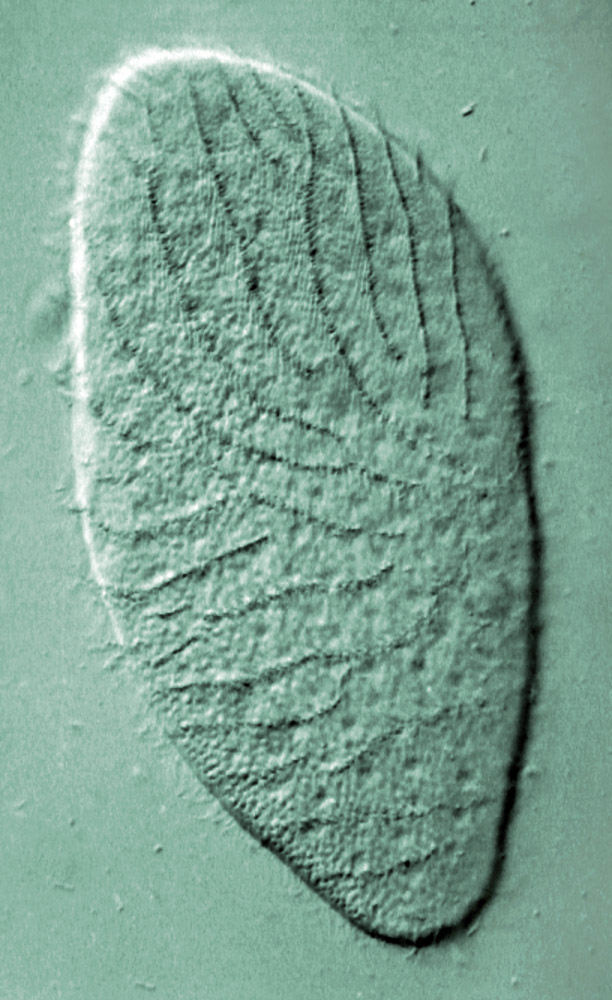
Opalina,
an opaline

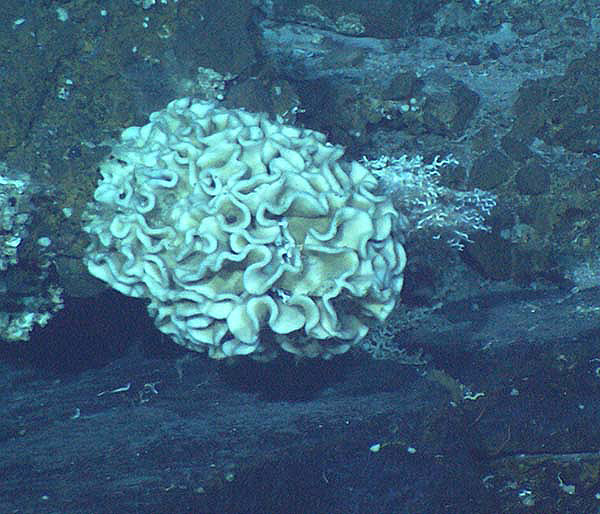
A 20 cm-wide deep-sea xenophyophore

- Flagellates are the most common protists, and very likely the most abundant eukaryotes on Earth. They move using one or more whip-like structures called flagella. (Note: Eukaryotic flagella are interchangeable with 'cilia' from a biological perspective. The usage of these two names depends on the author: some prefer to reserve cilia for shorter appendages and flagella for longer ones, while others prefer cilia for eukaryotes and flagella for prokaryotes. The term 'undulipodium' was proposed to unify the two concepts, as it refers specifically to the homologous microtubular structure found in both, but not found in prokaryotic flagella.) Most are heterotrophic (known as zooflagellates), feeding on bacteria or other organisms, ranging from filter feeders like choanoflagellates to active predators like provorans. Many are photo- or mixotrophic (known as phytoflagellates) and are studied as algae, like the dinoflagellates.
- Amoebae are known for their often flexible shape and ability to form extensions of the cytoplasm known as pseudopodia. These extensions come in various forms, such as lobose (blunt, rounded, as in Amoeba), filose (thin, tapering, as in cercozoans), or reticulose (branching networks, as in foraminifers). Some, called axopodia, take the shape of radiating projections supported by microtubules, characteristic of heliozoa and radiolaria. Some amoebae can grow to sizes visible to the naked eye, reaching up to 20 cm. Amoeboflagellates can produce both pseudopodia and flagella within the same life cycle.
- Ciliates have larger cells with two types of nuclei and rows of small flagella, known as cilia. They are often at the top of the microbial food web. Although ciliates compose a single lineage, some protists have evolved unusual large ciliate-like cells, such as the opalines.
- Certain parasitic protists traditionally described as sporozoa are immobile in their adult stage and reproduce through thick-walled spores, such as haplosporidians and apicomplexans. This term also included fungi and animals that have evolved a similar lifestyle—microsporidians and myxozoans, respectively. Other than their lifestyle, they have very little in common, and have evolved in distantly related groups.

Other single-celled algae exist in forms beyond the motile flagellates. Some are non-motile and encased in hard cell walls (coccoid, like diatoms) or embedded in a mucilage matrix (capsalean, like glaucophytes); others are amoeboid, like the reticulose chlorarachniophytes.

Examples of multicellular protists

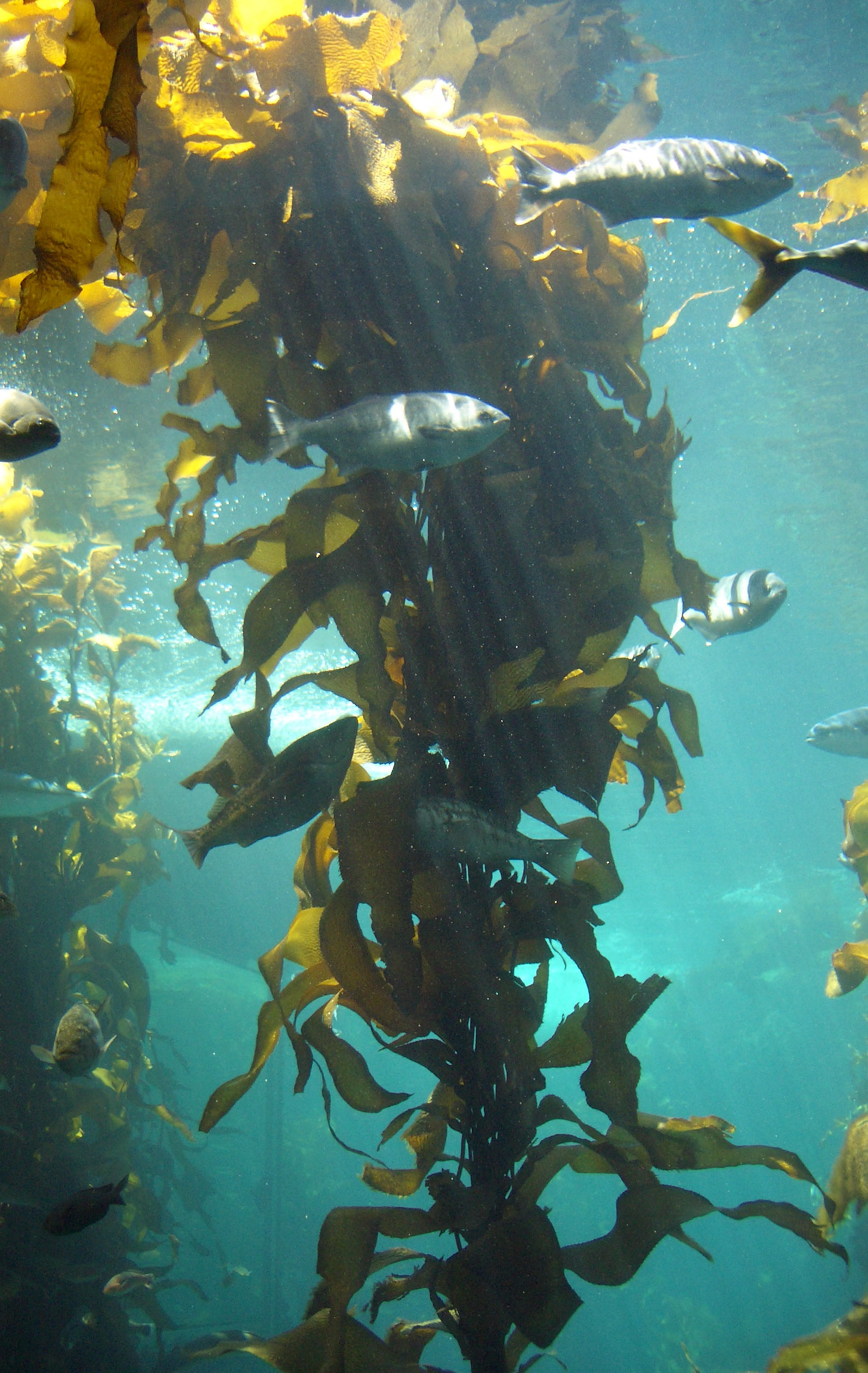
A kelp forest with Macrocystis, the giant kelp

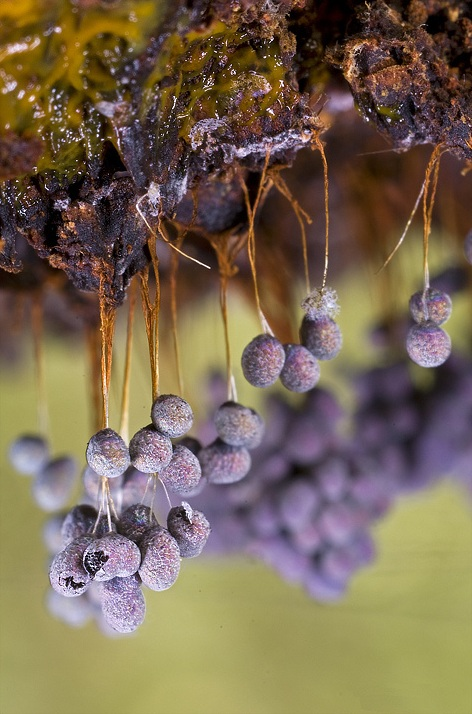
Sporocarps of the myxomycete Badhamia

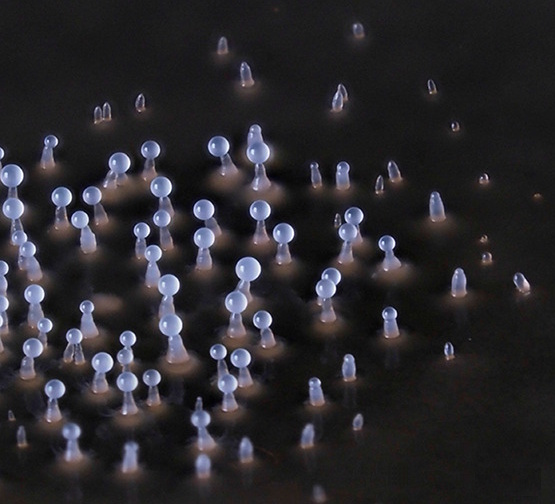
Sorocarps of the nucleariid Fonticula

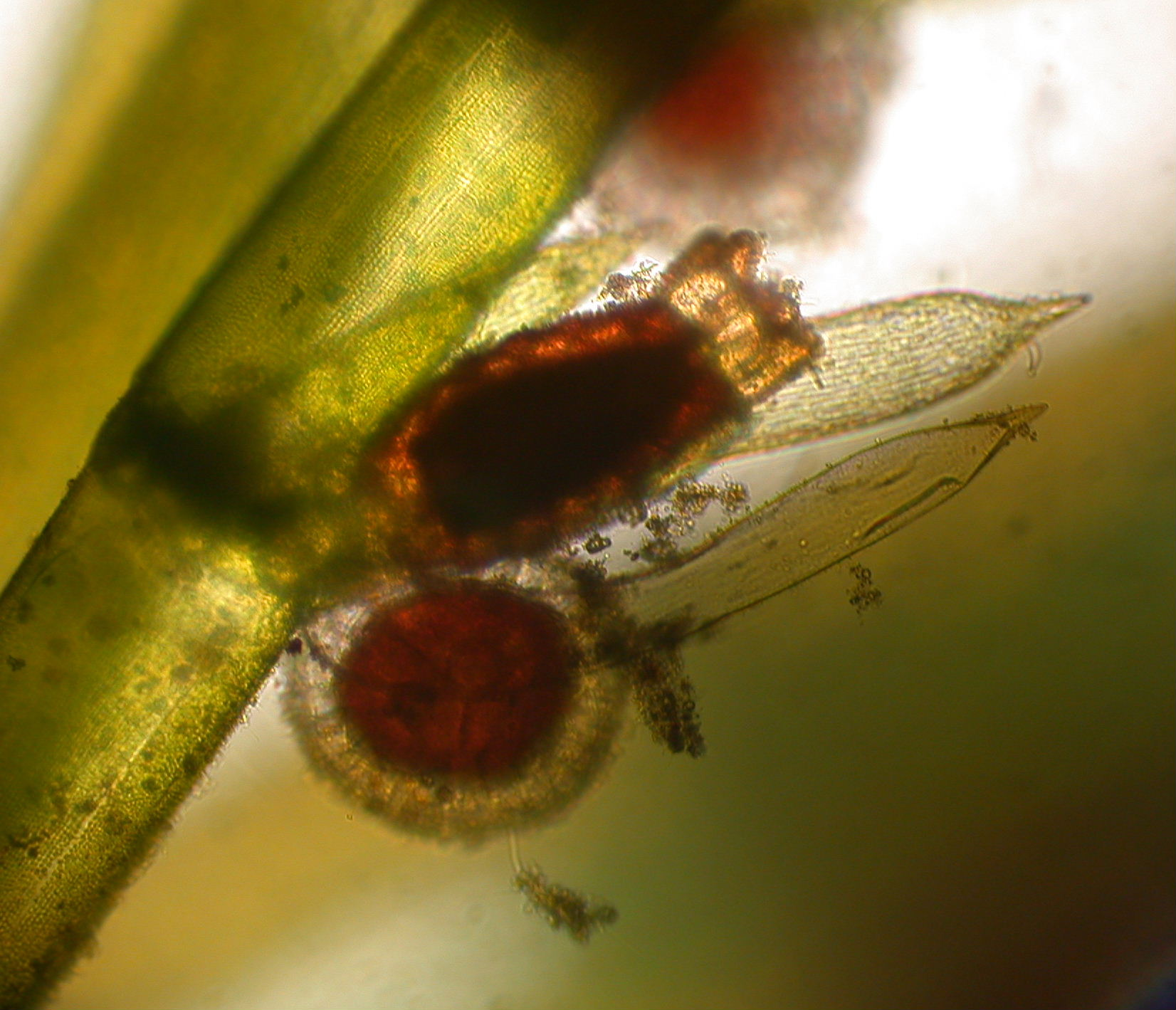
Reproductive structures of the green alga Chara

Multicellularity has evolved numerous times to various degrees among protists, resulting in organisms built either by cells aggregating together (aggregative) or by cells dividing without separating (clonal). For example:

- Fungus-like protists, traditionally studied by mycologists, are osmotrophic and produce macroscopic fruiting bodies for dispersal (sorocarps if aggregative, sporocarps if clonal). They may have hyphae-like bodies, or they may be slime molds, composed of individual amoebae until they form fruiting bodies. Some can reach lengths of several meters.
- Multicellular algae range from simple filaments and coenocytes to the highly complex brown algae, which have fully differentiated tissues (parenchymatous) resembling those of plants, or the red algae, with only partial differentiation (pseudoparenchymatous). In green algae alone multicellularity is thought to have evolved over 20 separate times, with some groups like the stoneworts developing specialized reproductive organs.

Other multicellular protists include amoebae that fuse into large networks, and colonial heliozoa and ciliates with new features not seen in solitary cells. The ciliate Haplozoon is interpreted to have animal-like embryonic development and cell type differentiation. Choanoflagellates, the closest living relatives of animals, include alternating cell types that are interpreted as early stages of animal multicellularity.

== Classification ==
=== Brief history ===
Starting in the 17th and 18th centuries, after the discovery of microscopic life by Antonie van Leeuwenhoek, the classification of single-celled protists was largely based on observations under light microscopy. Protists were incorporated into the traditional dichotomy that defined all life as either plant or animal: non-motile algae were considered part of the plant kingdom, and all other protists joined the animal kingdom. They were popularly known as "infusion animals" or infusoria, together with bacteria and small invertebrates. Otto Friedrich Müller was the first to introduce microbial protists to the Linnean system of binomial nomenclature.

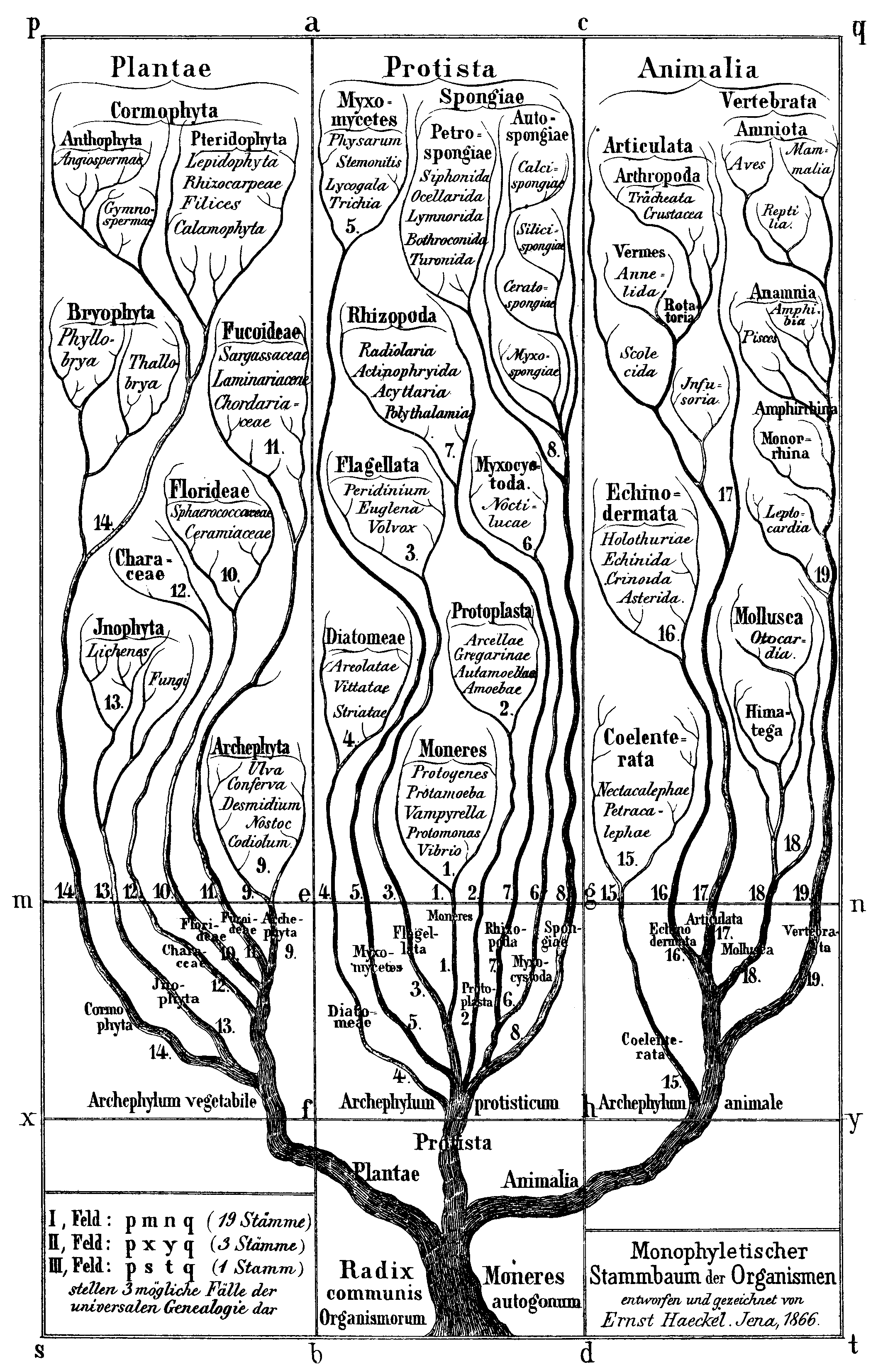
Haeckel's 1866 tree of life, with the third kingdom Protista.

During the 19th century, after several waves of naturalist studies, it became clear that these microorganisms were distinct from animals and plants. John Hogg and Ernst Haeckel proposed a separate kingdom of life, named Protoctista or Protista, respectively, to accommodate the predominantly unicellular eukaryotes, and initially bacteria, which were later excluded. The classical framework of protist classification was established, as exemplified by the works of Otto Bütschli, where they were grouped according to morphological and locomotive features, such as Mastigophora (flagellates), Rhizopoda (amoebae), Sporozoa (spore-forming parasites), and Infusoria (ciliates). However, Bütschli retained a division between the Protozoa (animal-like protists) and Protophyta (plant-like). This dogma remained dominant throughout the early 20th century.

From the mid-20th century, eukaryotes were firmly split from bacteria (prokaryotes) due to the presence of the cell nucleus, and protists (or protoctists) were more popularly accepted as a separate kingdom of eukaryotes. The advent of electron microscopy shifted the methods of classification, as it revealed previously unrecognized cellular characteristics (i.e., ultrastructure, particularly of the flagellar apparatus and the cytoskeleton) that suggested evolutionary affinities between superficially disparate lineages. For example, the tripartite flagellar mastigonemes were used to group heterokont algae, oomycetes and opalines into the Stramenopiles; the discovery of cortical alveoli showed affinities between dinoflagellates and ciliates, which now belong to the Alveolata; and disc-shaped mitochondrial cristae were shared by kinetoplastids and euglenids, now united as Euglenozoa. The algae-protozoa dichotomy became obsolete.

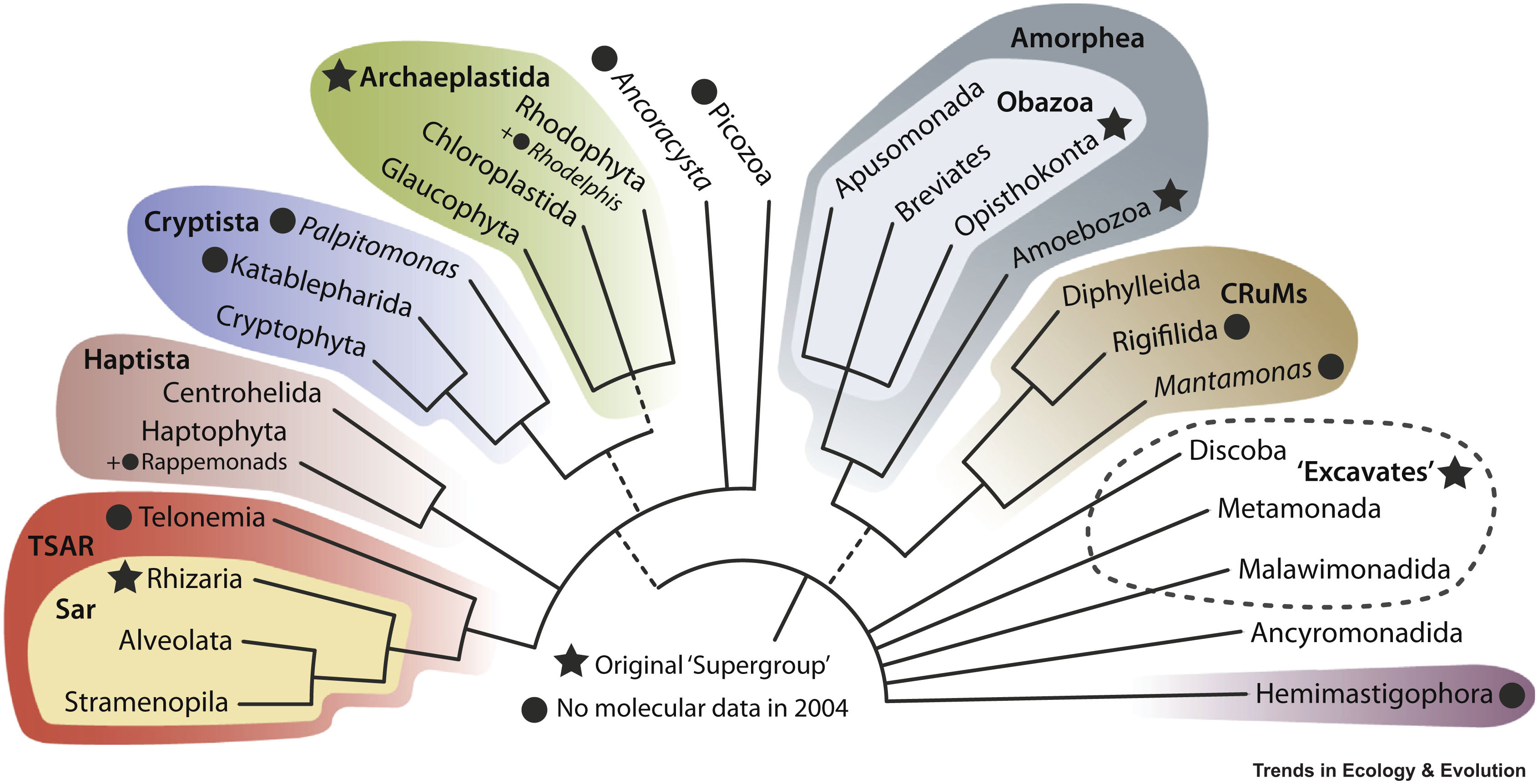
Phylogenomic tree of eukaryotes, as regarded in 2020. Supergroups are in color.

Since the 1990s, molecular phylogenetic analyses based primarily on the SSU rRNA gene demonstrated that protists were a paraphyletic assemblage of clades spanning the entire eukaryotic tree of life, from which the other three "kingdoms" (animals, plants, and fungi) had evolved. Beginning in the 2000s, single-cell sequencing and phylogenomics technologies progressively improved the resolution of deeper evolutionary relationships. Altogether, these innovations led to successive revisions of protist classification, such as the ones published by the International Society of Protistologists. Eukaryotes could no longer be divided into four monophyletic kingdoms, (Note: There was, however, one kingdom-based system that persisted into the 21st century, developed by Thomas Cavalier-Smith. He proposed two non-monophyletic kingdoms of protists, the Protozoa and the Chromista. He argued that protists with red algal-derived plastids and their heterotrophic relatives (i.e., Stramenopiles, Alveolata, Haptista and Cryptista) shared a single common photosynthetic ancestor, and composed the Chromalveolata or, later with the addition of Rhizaria, the Chromista, which was polyphyletic. This scheme endured until 2022, the year of his last publication.) and instead are arranged in "supergroups", each often encompassing an unexpected variety of morphologies and lifestyles that do not resemble one another. New deep-branching groups are added to the tree at a rate of nearly one per year.

=== Modern classification and diversity ===
Protists are currently divided among a number of clades informally named supergroups. Most of these supergroups fall under either of two large clades of eukaryotes: Amorphea and Diaphoretickes. The animals and fungi belong to the Opisthokonta supergroup in the Amorphea clade, along with several other groups of protists (e.g., Amoebozoa). Diaphoretickes contains the diverse supergroups Archaeplastida (including plants), Stramenopiles, Alveolata, Rhizaria (combined as the SAR supergroup), and the less species-rich Cryptista, Haptista, Telonemia, and Disparia. Outside of these larger clades, various groups of protists with primitive cell architecture (Discoba, Metamonada, and Malawimonadida) are collectively known as the excavates or "Excavata". The name 'excavate' refers to the shared characteristic of a ventral groove in the cell used for feeding, which is considered an ancestral trait present in the last eukaryotic common ancestor.

The following table lists estimated numbers of described extant species for all known major protist clades, and provides an overview of their diversity in terms of morphologies, habitats, and nutritional modes. For large groups, the overview is not exhaustive and only mentions the most characteristic members.

Group	Major clade		Example	Brief description of morphology, lifestyle and habitat	Living species
Diaph.	SAR	Stramenopiles		Ancestrally flagellates distinguished by two 'heterokont' (unequal) flagella, one with tripartite mastigonemes. Present in virtually all habitats. The most species-rich lineage, the ochrophytes, are algae of diverse morphologies, ranging from flagellates (like golden algae) to walled ornamented cells (like diatoms, pictured) to truly multicellular macroalgae with differentiated tissues (brown algae such as kelp). All other lineages are composed of heterotrophs: bacterivorous flagellates (e.g., bicosoecids, bigyromonads), fungus-like osmotrophs (oomycetes, hyphochytrids, and labyrinthulomycetes), heliozoan amoebae (actinophryids), and ciliate-like obligate symbionts of animals (opalinids).	over 100,000
Diaph.	SAR	Alveolata		Ancestrally flagellated predators with cortical alveoli. The colponemids represent these ancestral characteristics. The most diverse group are the ciliates (pictured), with large cells covered in rows of cilia, usually at the top of the microbial food chain. The remaining alveolates belong to the clade Myzozoa and are ancestrally photosynthetic; some have retained their photosynthetic ability (chromerids and many dinoflagellates), while others have evolved into parasites of animals and algae (apicomplexans, perkinsozoans, and some dinoflagellates).	over 10,000
Diaph.	SAR	Rhizaria		Amoebae with filose or reticulose pseudopodia. The most species-rich group is Retaria, home to conspicuous marine amoebae encased in hard skeletons (radiolarians) or multichambered tests (foraminifers, pictured). Secondly is Cercozoa, with an extreme diversity of morphologies: small flagellates, amoeboflagellates, aggregative slime molds, testate amoebae, heliozoa, and massive radiolarian-like cells (phaeodarians); some are capable of photosynthesis (e.g., chlorarachniophytes). Lastly, Endomyxa contains both free-living predatory amoebae (e.g., vampyrellids) and obligate parasites of animals, plants, and algae (e.g., phytomyxeans and ascetosporeans).	over 11,000
Diaph.	Telonemia			Free-living flagellates with a unique cytoskeleton and a combination of cell structures. Present in all marine and freshwater environments feeding on bacteria.	10
Diaph.	Haptista			Two groups of different free-living single-celled protists: centrohelids—predatory heliozoan amoebae, widespread in aquatic and soil environments—and haptophytes—coccoid or flagellated photosynthetic algae, mostly marine (e.g., coccolithophores, pictured). Both can produce an outer coat of complex mineralized scales.	over 600
Diaph.	Pancryptista			Free-living flagellates, except one species of heliozoan amoebae, Microheliella maris. Almost all of the flagellates are distinguished by specialized ribbon-shaped extrusomes known as ejectisomes. Many are photosynthetic, known as cryptomonads (pictured), while the rest are phagotrophs, consumers of bacteria. Present in aquatic environments worldwide.	over 100
Diaph.	Archaeplastida*			Algae with chloroplasts derived from primary endosymbiosis with a cyanobacterium. Found in all environments. Almost entirely photosynthetic, with the exception of two small groups of phagotrophic flagellates, rhodelphids and picozoans. The two major groups, red algae and green algae (pictured), exhibit diverse morphologies, ranging from single cells—coccoid, palmelloid, sarcinoid, flagellated—to colonies, simple filaments, and macroscopic thalli with varying degrees of complexity (e.g., coralline algae, sea lettuce, stoneworts). Also included are glaucophytes, rare blue-green algae found in surface waters.	over 20,500*
Diaph.	Disparia			Three lineages of free-living predatory flagellates with unique cytoskeletons. These are: Hemimastigophora, with two rows of flagella, present in soils and aquatic sediments; Provora, fast-swimming predators of other protists through a strong feeding apparatus resembling jaws, found in low abundance in marine environments globally; and Caelestes (pictured), rare inhabitants of the marine benthos whose cells protrude arms or stalks used for movement or prey capture.	20
Amorph.	Amoebozoa			Amoebae of diverse morphologies, with lobose or filose pseudopodia, and sometimes with flagella. Most are free-living phagotrophs found across terrestrial and aquatic environments, such as the archetypal genus Amoeba itself, or the testate amoebae Arcellinida, one of the most conspicuous groups of protists. Numerous groups have independently evolved fungus-like fruiting bodies, such as myxomycetes (pictured). Some of the free-living amoebae are important vectors of pathogenic bacteria or are pathogenic themselves (e.g., Acanthamoeba). Others are anaerobic intestinal symbionts (e.g., Entamoeba).	over 2,400
Amorph.	Breviatea			Anaerobic free-living amoeboflagellates with fine pseudopodia and modified mitochondria. Present only in low-oxygen marine and brackish sediments, their growth depends on mutualistic interactions with prokaryotes.	4
Amorph.	Apusomonadida			Free-living flagellates distinguished by a proboscis, a sleeve-like structure that envelops one of their two flagella. Found gliding on wet soil and aquatic sediments worldwide.	28
Amorph.	Opisthokonta**			Flagellates distinguished by a single posterior flagellum, many with complex life cycles and varying degrees of multicellularity. Some are entirely amoeboid, with fine pseudopodia (e.g., filastereans and nucleariids, including slime molds), while others become amoeboid temporarily (e.g., choanoflagellates, pictured). Most species are free-living filter-feeders or predators, but some lineages (e.g., ichthyosporids) evolved into osmotrophic parasites of animals.	approx. 300**
Excavates***	Discoba			Flagellates with very different lifestyles, present in aquatic and terrestrial environments, ranging from aerobes to anaerobes. The most diverse group, Euglenozoa, includes free-living osmotrophs, phagotrophs, phototrophs (euglenophyceans, pictured), and pathogens (kinetoplastids). The less diverse Heterolobosea are primarily amoeboflagellates, and include some slime molds (acrasids) and well-known opportunistic parasites (e.g., Naegleria fowleri). A third, smaller group, Jakobida, consume bacteria by suspension feeding.	over 2,200
Excavates***	Metamonada			Anaerobic or microaerophilic flagellates, amoebae, or amoeboflagellates, with reduced or completely lost mitochondria. A few are free-living, found in aquatic hypoxic sediments, but most species are obligate parasites (e.g., Giardia, pictured) or commensals in animal intestines (e.g., parabasalids). Many have a high number of flagella.	approx. 800
Excavates***	Malawimonadida			Free-living bacterivorous flagellates that feed by suspension feeding, present in marine or fresh waters.	3
—	Ancyromonadida			Tiny free-living aquatic flagellates composed of flattened cells with an inflexible pellicle and a lateral rostrum with extrusomes. Found in most aquatic habitats.	over 20
—	CRuMs			Free-living flagellates and filose amoebae with a pellicle underneath the cell membrane. Almost all flagellated members can produce filose pseudopodia. Found in aquatic environments.	14
*Excluding plants. **Excluding animals and fungi. ***Paraphyletic.

There are also many protists of uncertain position because their DNA has not been sequenced, and consequently their phylogenetic affinities are unknown.

=== Predicted diversity ===
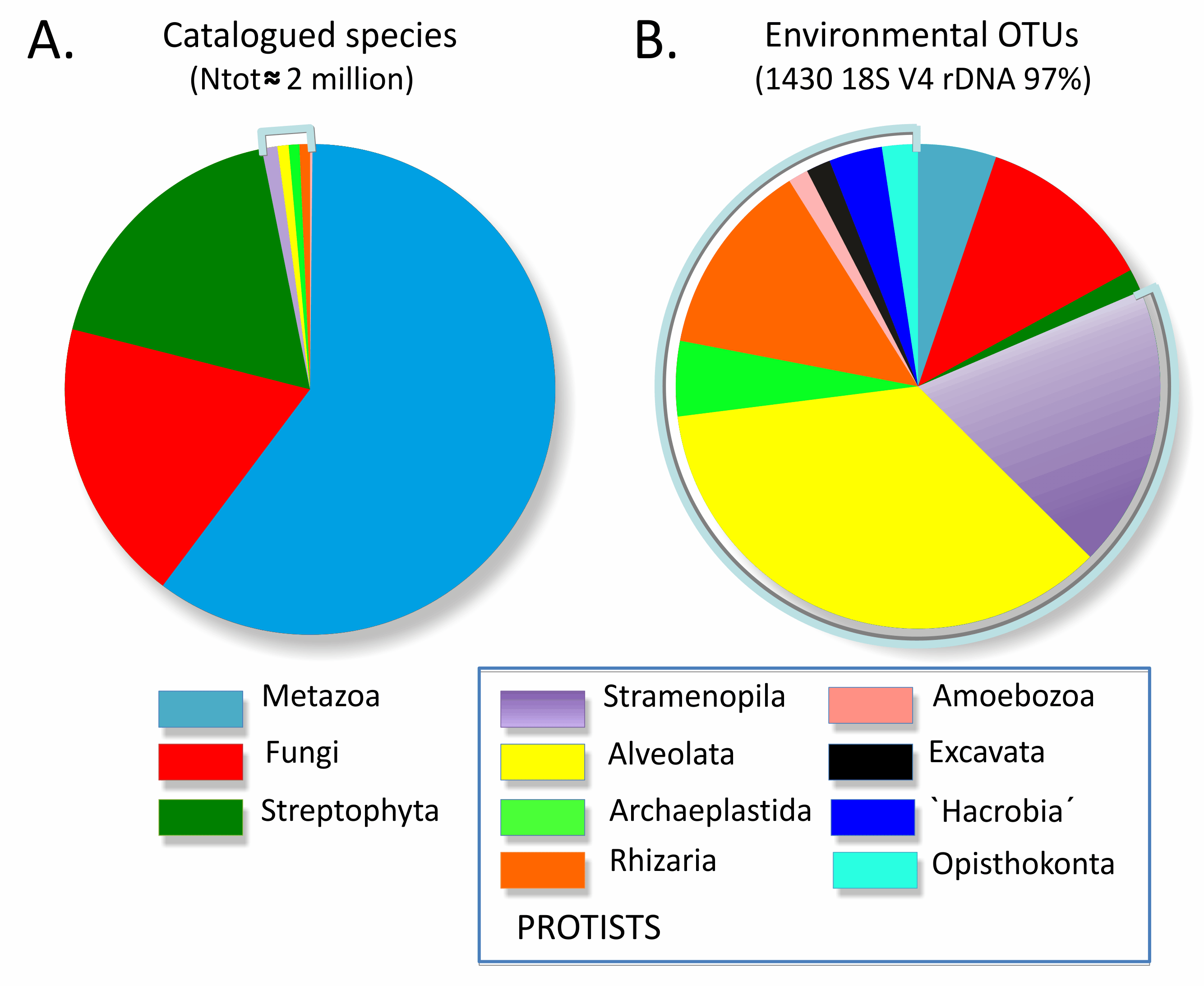
Difference between catalogued species (A) and genetic diversity (B) of eukaryotes. In the legend, "Archaeplastida" and "Opisthokonta" exclude Streptophyta, Animalia and Fungi.

The total species diversity of protists is severely underestimated by traditional methods that differentiate species based on morphological characteristics. The number of catalogued protist species is very low (ranging from 26,000 to over 76,000) (Note: A 2007 report on protist diversity included a table listing the described number of species for protist and fungal groups. The total sum of the listed species, excluding fungi, is 76,144.) in comparison to the diversity of land plants, animals and fungi, which are historically and biologically well-known and studied. The predicted number of species also varies greatly, ranging from 140,000 to 1,600,000, and in several groups the number of predicted species is arbitrarily doubled. Most of these predictions are highly subjective. Molecular techniques such as environmental DNA barcoding have revealed a vast diversity of undescribed protists that accounts for the majority of eukaryotic sequences or operational taxonomic units (OTUs), dwarfing those from land plants, animals and fungi. As such, it is considered that protists dominate eukaryotic diversity.

== Biology ==
In general, protists have typical eukaryotic cells that follow the same principles of biology described for those cells within the "higher" eukaryotes (animals, fungi and land plants). However, many have evolved a variety of unique physiological adaptations that do not appear in the remaining eukaryotes, and in fact protists encompass almost all of the broad spectrum of biological characteristics expected in eukaryotes.

=== Nutrition ===
Protists display a wide variety of food preferences and feeding mechanisms. According to the nutrient source, they can be divided into autotrophs (or phototrophs, producers, traditionally algae), which photosynthesize their own organic molecules, and heterotrophs (consumers, traditionally protozoa), which obtain organic molecules from the environment, either by passive feeding of small particles (i.e., osmotrophs) or by engulfing whole cells or parts of cells of other organisms (phagotrophs).

==== Phagotrophy ====
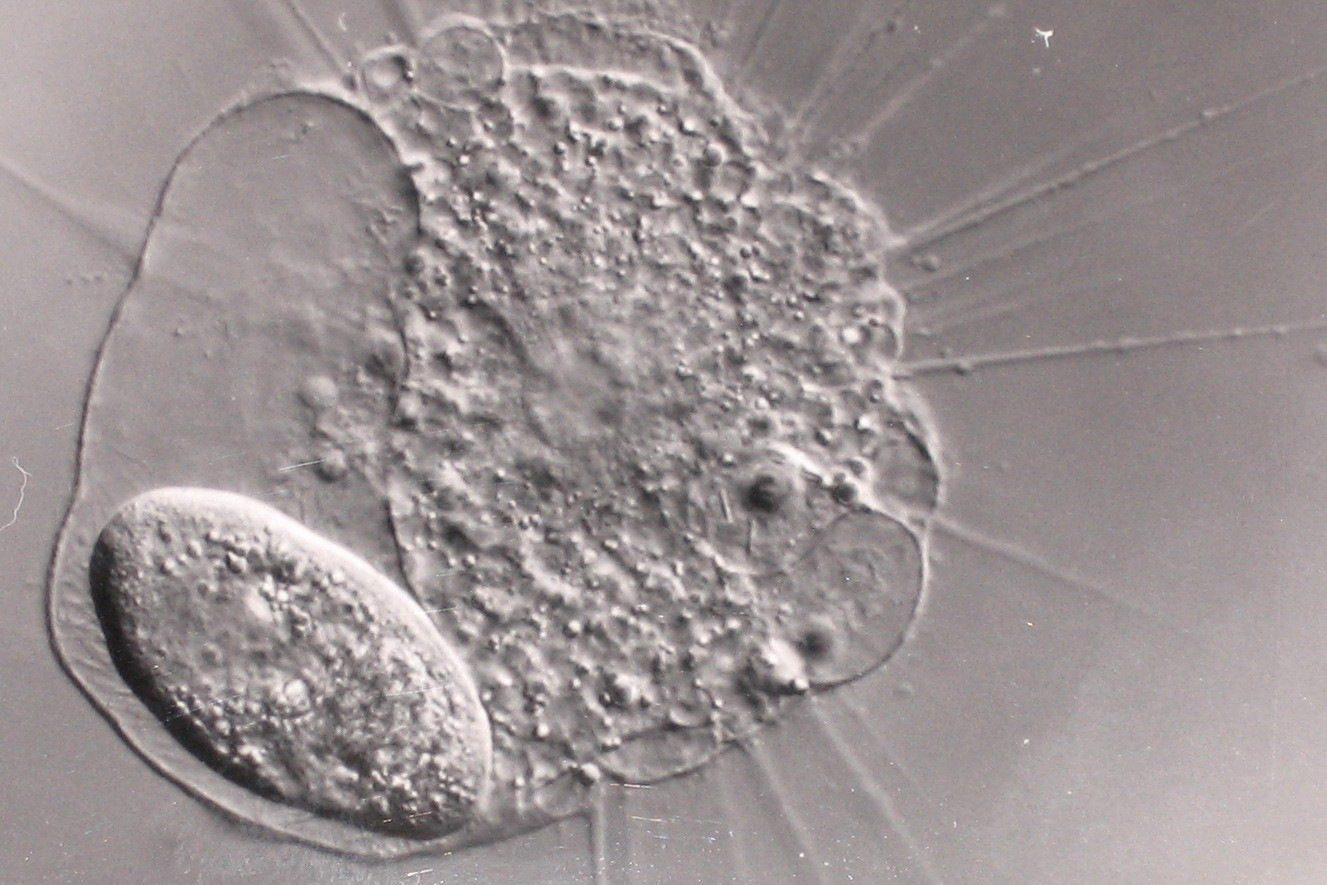
The heliozoan Actinophrys sol phagocytosing a Paramecium ciliate

Phagotrophic protists feed by phagocytosis, a process unique to eukaryotes where food particles or cells are digested into a vacuole, the phagosome. This is the general mode of nutrition for protists, and has resulted in a diverse array of strategies for hunting and digestion. Usually, digestion occurs at a specialized mouth-like region of the cell, the cytostome, which may be followed by the cytopharynx, a tract supported by microtubules. In amoebae, phagocytosis takes place anywhere on the cell surface.

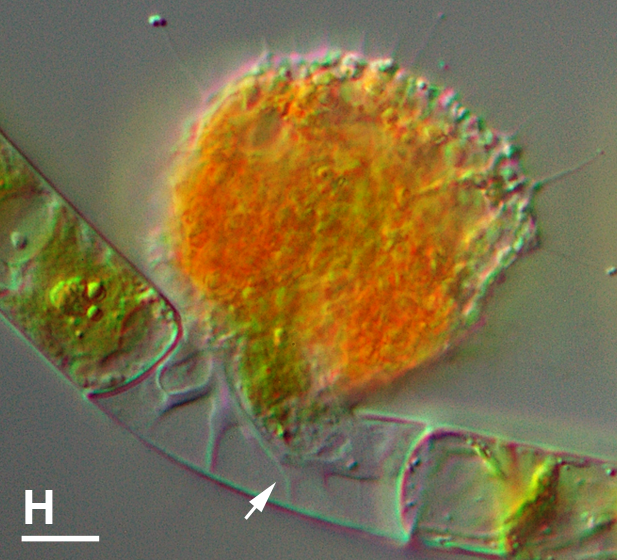
Vampyrella lateritia extracting algal cell content with a pseudopodium (arrow)

According to the method of digestion, protists can be divided into filter, raptorial, or diffusion feeders. Filter feeders accumulate small suspended particles into the cytostome by filtering them through pseudopodia or rigid tentacles, like choanoflagellates, or by generating water currents around the cytostome, like ciliates. Raptorial feeders capture whole cells, either grazing on surfaces like bacterial lawns or actively preying on larger cells of other organisms. Diffusion feeders, like suctorian ciliates and heliozoans, passively engulf prey that happen to collide with their tentacles or pseudopodia and are immobilized. Certain protists exhibit a variation of predation known as myzocytosis, where they perforate the prey cell and suck out its contents or ingest them from the inside, leaving behind an empty shell; this is the case for vampyrellids, viridiraptorids, and many alveolates.

Different predatory protists have sophisticated structures for capturing prey, such as the ventral groove of excavates, the hood-like extension or 'pallium' of some dinoflagellates, or the expandable oral pocket of ciliates. Many euglenids have a system of rods and vanes that grab and pull in prey cells, similarly to a Chinese finger trap.

Preys of phagotrophic protists range from prokaryotes (i.e., bacterivores) to other eukaryotes, including single-celled protists, algae, fungi, nematodes, or tissues of larger animals. Prey specificity varies, with some groups specialized in eating only one type of organisms, or only a particular strain. Traditionally, protists were considered primarily bacterivorous due to biases in cultivation techniques, but most are omnivores.

==== Osmotrophy ====
Osmotrophic protists absorb soluble or very small (under 0.5 μm) molecules by diffusion, membrane channels and carriers, or pinocytosis, where nutrients are engulfed into small vacuoles or endosomes. Some osmotrophs, known as saprotrophs or lysotrophs, perform external digestion by releasing digestive enzymes into the environment and decomposing organic matter into simpler molecules that can be absorbed, allowing finer control over substances that enter the cell and minimizing the risk of harmful substances or infection. Probably all eukaryotes are capable of osmotrophy, but some have no alternative of acquiring nutrients. Obligate osmotrophs include the aphagean euglenids, some green algae, the human parasite Blastocystis, some metamonads, the parasitic trypanosomatids, and the fungus-like oomycetes and hyphochytrids.

==== Mixotrophy ====
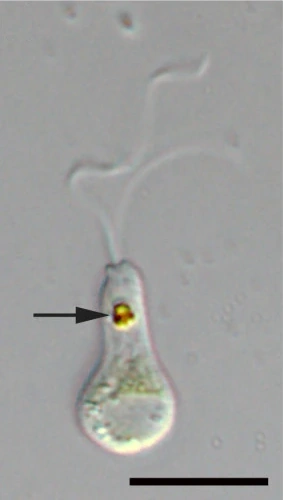
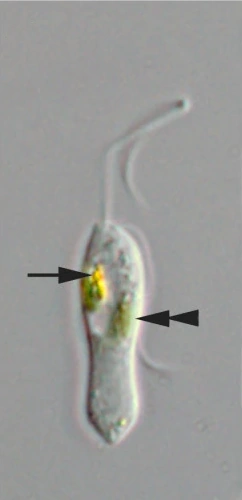
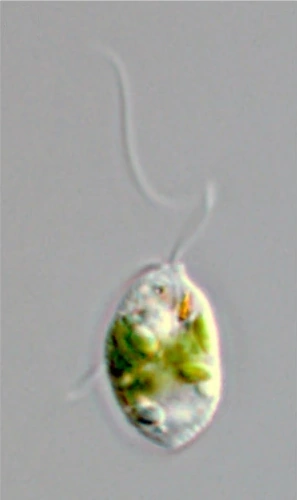
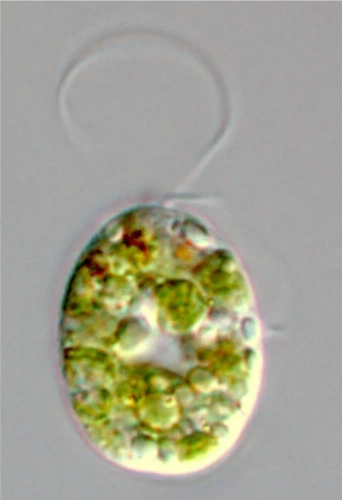
Rapaza viridis is a species of obligate specialist mixotrophs: it survives through the predation of Tetraselmis algae and acquisition of their chloroplasts. It rejects any other prey cells. Even when well fed, it cannot survive without a light source, as it needs to photosynthesize with those chloroplasts.

Most photosynthetic protists are mixotrophs, as they combine photosynthesis with phagocytosis. (Note: The terms "mixotroph" and "mixoplankton" almost exclusively refer to protists that perform photosynthesis and phagocytosis (photo-phagotrophs). Osmotrophy is always present, but not taken into account. As such, "pure" phototrophs (incapable of phagocytosis) and "pure" phagotrophs (incapable of photosynthesis) are technically mixotrophic due to their innate ability for osmotrophy, but are not usually reported in this sense.) While some mixotrophs already have chloroplasts (i.e., algae), others acquire chloroplasts by stealing them from their prey, a process known as kleptoplasty. Kleptoplastic protists may be generalists, able to steal chloroplasts from a variety of prey, like some ciliates, or they may be specialists, only capable of obtaining chloroplasts from very specific prey. Specialists may keep the entire prey inside of their cells, as do many foraminifers and radiolarians, or they may only engulf the plastids and discard the rest.

Among exclusively heterotrophic protists, variation of nutritional modes is also observed. The diplonemids, which inhabit deep waters where photosynthesis is absent, can flexibly switch between osmotrophy and bacterivory depending on the environmental conditions.

=== Homeostasis ===
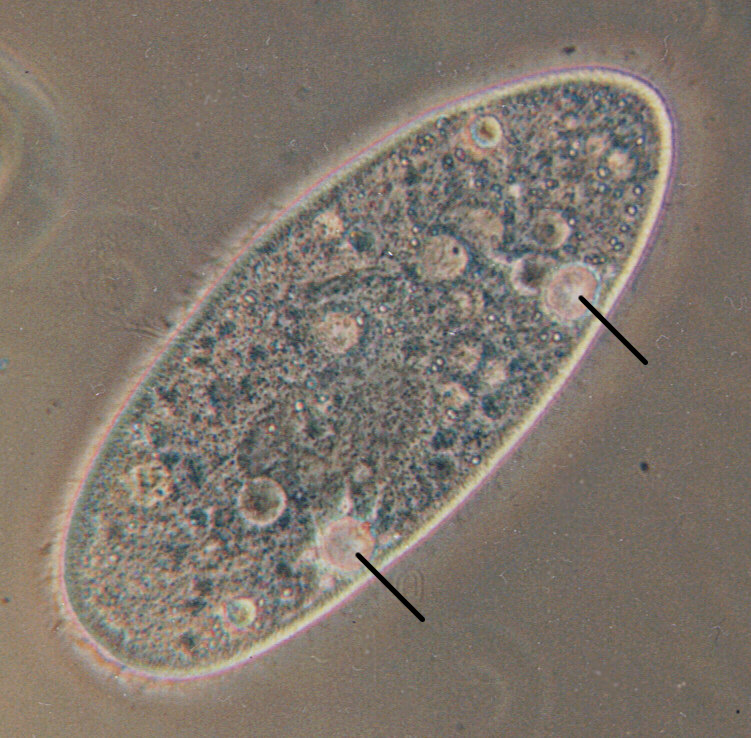
Contractile vacuoles in Paramecium aurelia

Many freshwater protists need to osmoregulate (i.e., remove excess water volume to adjust the ion concentrations) because non-saline water enters in excess from the environment. Osmoregulation is done through ion transporters of the cell membrane and through contractile vacuoles, specialized organelles unique to protists that periodically excrete fluid high in potassium and sodium through a cycle of contractions. These vacuoles are surrounded by the spongiome, a system of vesicles or tubes that slowly collect fluid from the cytoplasm into the vacuoles, which then contract and discharge the fluid through a pore. The mechanism, location, and structure of this system vary across protists. For example, ciliates contract the vacuoles by actin and microtubule filaments; dinoflagellates contract it through a sheath formed by a flagellar rootlet, known as the pusule. Marine, parasitic, or thick-walled protists lack these vacuoles.

Certain protists have acidic organelles known as acidocalcisomes, which store high concentrations of phosphorus, calcium, and enzymes related to their metabolism. Among their proposed functions are osmoregulation and maintenance of pH and calcium homeostasis.

=== Mitochondria and respiration ===
The last eukaryotic common ancestor was aerobic, bearing mitochondria that synthesize ATP through oxidative respiration, which requires oxygen. Most protists are aerobes, but many lineages of free-living and parasitic protists have independently adapted to inhabit anaerobic or microaerophilic (low-oxygen) habitats by modifying their mitochondria into organelles collectively known as mitochondrion-related organelles (MROs). These exist in a continuum from lower to higher degrees of reduction. For example, hydrogenosomes have lost the electron transport chain used in respiration, as well as other features of classical mitochondria (their DNA, the Krebs cycle, etc.), but can still generate ATP anaerobically through the fermentation of pyruvate, releasing hydrogen gas as a byproduct. Mitosomes have lost both the respiratory chain and the production of ATP. One group of protists, the genus Monocercomonoides, has lost its mitochondria entirely. In a similar manner, the oxidative peroxisome evolved into a fermentative glycosome in trypanosomatids.

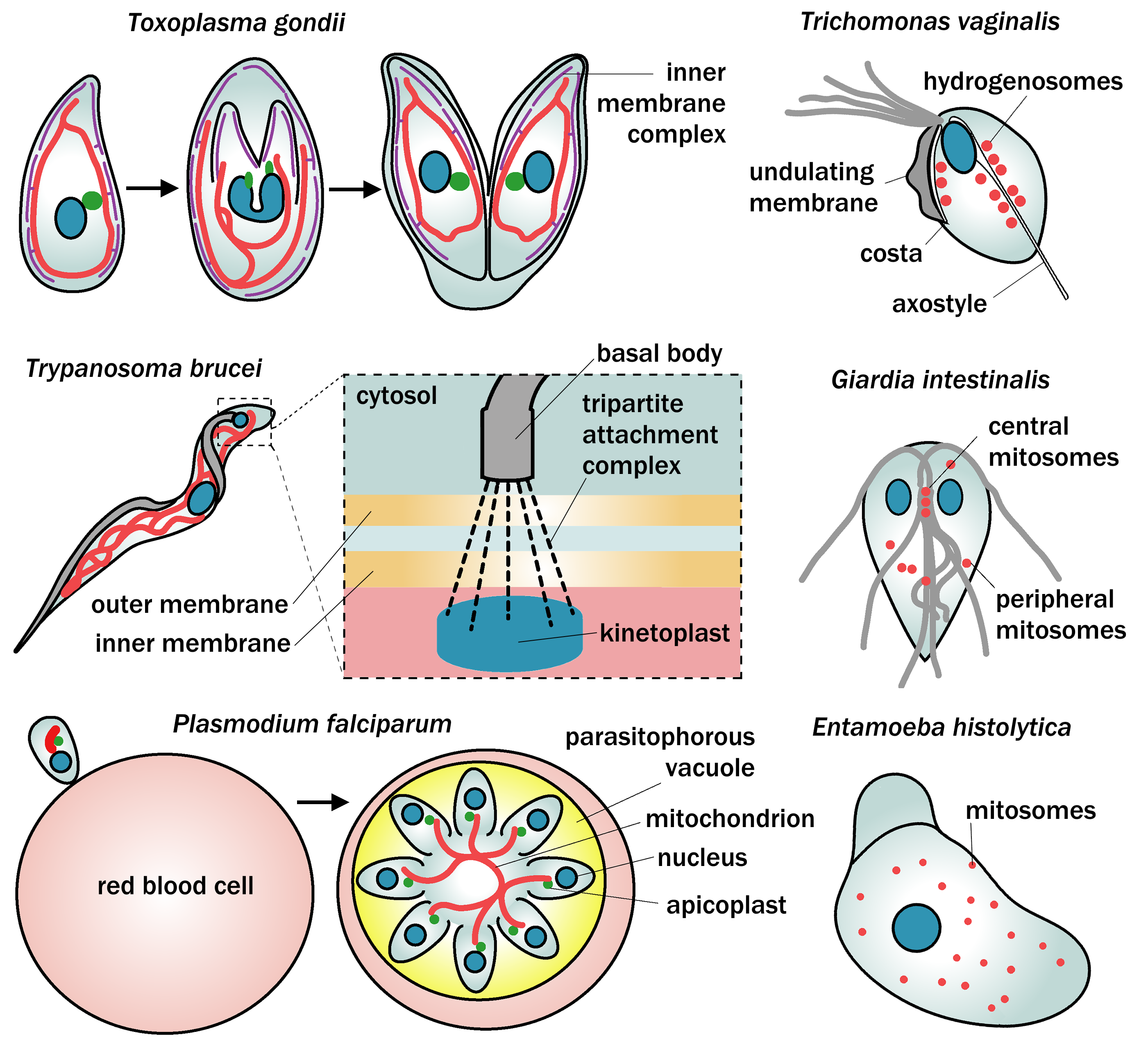
Diversity of mitochondria (in red) across protists

Besides metabolic reduction, the shape, composition, and number of mitochondria varies greatly across protists. Apicomplexans and kinetoplastids have a single large mitochondrion that divides synchronously with the cell, while some amoebae can present hundreds of mitochondria. Mitochondrial genomes (mitogenomes), typically composed of one circular chromosome, can appear as numerous linear chromosomes in many unrelated protists, such as Amoebidium, with hundreds of chromosomes. The large mitogenome of kinetoplastids is condensed into a kinetoplast, which is physically tied to the flagellar apparatus. The smallest known mitogenome belongs to the symbiotic alga Chromera velia.

Mitochondrial cristae, foldings of the inner membrane, have been used to classify protists since the advent of electron microscopy. Flat cristae are the ancestral trait, tubular cristae are present in the SAR supergroup and Amoebozoa, and discoid cristae distinguish the Discoba.

=== Cytoskeleton ===
The cytoskeleton of protists generally consists of an array of microtubules and other fibers that radiate from a complex flagellar apparatus. This structure—sometimes known as the mastigont—was present in the ancestor of all eukaryotes, and is fundamental to the structure, movement and division of cells. It is one of the only cellular features that can be compared across all protists, as it is relatively conserved.

The interior of the flagellum, the axoneme, consists of a common structure of nine pairs of microtubules surrounding two central microtubules, known as the 9+2 structure. At its base is a basal body or kinetosome, a complex proteic structure that forms the centrioles and behaves as the microtubule organizing center. Microtubules emerge from each basal body in the form of one or two 'roots'. The basic plan of the flagellar apparatus consists of two basal bodies (B1 and B2), one for each flagellum, followed by four primary microtubular 'roots' (named R1 through R4) and a 'singlet root' (SR) formed by a single microtubule and originating from B1. Attached to the R1 is a multilayered structure, also known as C fiber.

Each protist group has modifications or secondary losses of this standard organization. In groups where the standard structure is mostly untouched (e.g., excavates, stramenopiles, and apusomonads), the R1, R2 and SR roots provide reinforcement for the ventral feeding groove, and the R3 supports the dorsal side of the cell. In opisthokonts, one flagellum and all the microtubular roots were lost, but both basal bodies remain. In archaeplastids, the SR and R2 supporting the feeding groove were lost, likely due to their shift to autotrophic nutrition. In certain protists the flagellar apparatus is physically linked to the nucleus, forming what is known as the karyomastigont. This connection is often done through different kinds of filamentous structures, variously called rhizoplasts or internal flagellar roots.

=== Sensory perception ===
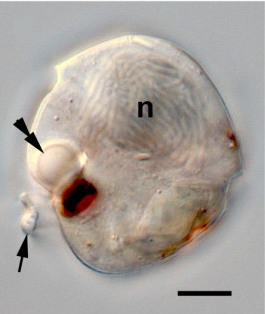
A dinoflagellate with an ocelloid (double arrowhead)

Many flagellates and probably all motile algae exhibit a positive phototaxis (i.e. they swim or glide toward a source of light). For this purpose, they exhibit photoreceptors of varying degrees of complexity, from simple receptors with light antennae (as in the eyespot apparatus of many algae), to receptors with opaque screens, to complex ocelloids with intracellular lenses (as in the dinoflagellate family Warnowiaceae). Some ciliates orient themselves in relation to the Earth's gravitational field while moving (geotaxis), and others swim in relation to the concentration of dissolved oxygen in the water.

=== Symbionts ===
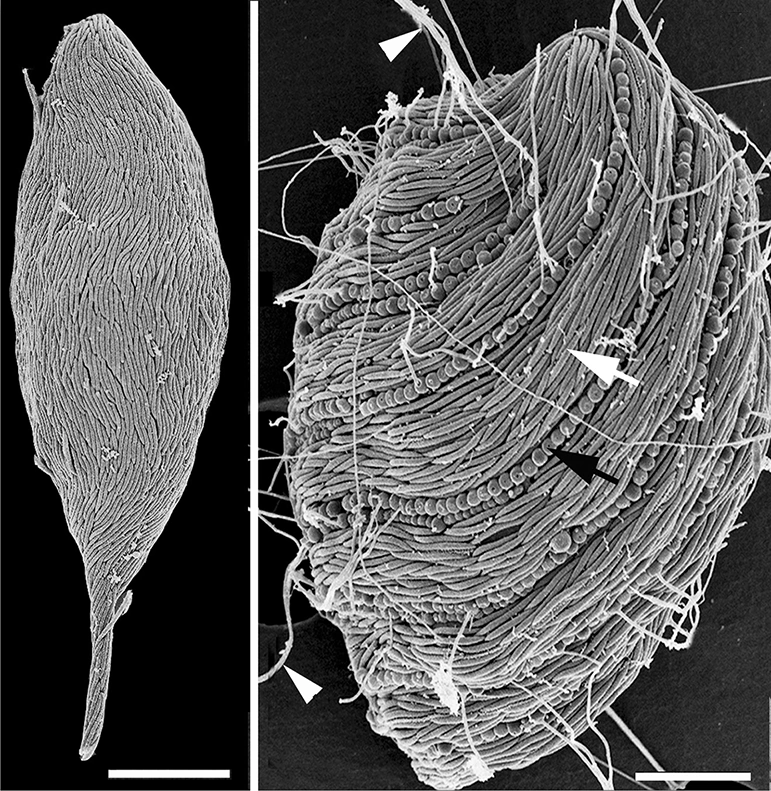
Scanning electron micrographs of a symbiontid showing two types of epibiotic bacteria: rod-shaped proteobacteria (white arrow) and spherical verrucomicrobia (black arrow) that discharge threads of DNA (white arrowheads).

Protist cells have an accentuated tendency to harbor mutualistic symbionts, which have produced new physiological opportunities. Some associations are permanent, others more transient. Many protists maintain cyanobacteria or other algae as endosymbionts, to benefit from their photosynthesis—especially in radiolarians, foraminifers, and other planktonic marine protists—or their nitrogen fixation. Others maintain only the chloroplasts of algae they ingest, and dispose of the remaining cellular structures (i.e., kleptoplasty). Two species of ciliates have been observed hosting purple bacteria, which perform photosynthesis without oxygen.

Several groups of protists host non-photosynthetic prokaryotes, often maintaining an anaerobic lifestyle through the metabolism of their symbionts. Xenosomes are bacterial endosymbionts with a methanogenic role, found in anaerobic ciliates. Symbiontid euglenozoans and select ciliates have sulfur-oxidizing bacteria living as epibionts on their surfaces. Similarly, breviates have hydrogen-oxidizing epibiotic bacteria. Metamonads, particularly parabasalids and oxymonads found in the hindgut of termites, typically host methanogenic archaea as epi- or endobionts.

Some rare associations involve prokaryotes that defend the protist host against potential predators, namely in symbiontids and in the ciliate Euplotidium, where the epibionts are verrucomicrobia that eject genetic material as a defense mechanism. There are also some species of oxymonads whose epibionts function as chemosensors, providing their host with information on the surrounding chemical gradient.

Besides algae, occurrence of mutualistic eukaryotic symbionts is rare among protists. In the genus Neoparamoeba, some species have endosymbionts that resemble Perkinsela amoebae, a species of trypanosomatids. Although no benefits are yet known from this association, their evolution matches almost perfectly, suggesting that the symbionts are inherited.

== Life cycle and reproduction ==
Consensus life cycle of free-living protists, showing the ploidy (n) at each stage. (Note: Every sexual cycle involves syngamy and meiosis, which increase or decrease the ploidy (i.e., number of chromosome sets, represented by the letter n), respectively. Syngamy is the fusion of two haploid (1n) reproductive cells, known as gametes, into a diploid (2n) cell called zygote, which then undergoes meiosis to generate haploid cells.) Purple arrows represent a full haplo-diploid cycle, while the green and blue arrows represent the variations present in the haploid (meiosis immediately after syngamy) and the diploid (syngamy immediately after meiosis) cycles, respectively. Vegetative reproduction is shown in pink.

Protists exhibit a large variability of life cycles and strategies involving multiple stages of different morphologies which have allowed them to thrive in most environments. Nevertheless, most research concerning protist life cycles corresponds to model organisms and important parasites; knowledge on the life cycles of the free-living majority remains fragmentary.

=== Asexual reproduction ===
Protists typically reproduce asexually under favorable environmental conditions, allowing for rapid exponential population growth with minimal genetic variation. This occurs through mitosis and has historically been considered the main reproductive mode in protists. Unicellular protists often multiply via binary fission, like bacteria; they can also divide through budding, similarly to yeasts, or through multiple fissions, a process known as schizogony. In multicellular protists, this process is often known as vegetative reproduction, only performed by the 'vegetative stage' or individual. It can take the form of fragmentation of body parts, or specialized propagules composed of numerous cells (e.g., in red algae).

=== Sexual reproduction ===
Sexual reproduction is a fundamental characteristic of eukaryotes. It involves meiosis (a specialized nuclear division enabling genetic recombination) and syngamy (the fusion of nuclei from two parents), two processes thought to have been present in the last eukaryotic common ancestor, which likely had the ability to reproduce sexually on a facultative (non-obligate) basis. Even protists that no longer reproduce sexually still retain a core set of meiosis-related genes, reflecting their descent from sexual ancestors. For example, although amoebae are traditionally considered asexual organisms, most asexual amoebae likely arose recently and independently from sexually reproducing amoeboid ancestors. Even in the early 20th century, some researchers interpreted phenomena related to chromidia (chromatin granules free in the cytoplasm) in amoebae as sexual reproduction. Three distinguishable sexual cycles are observed in protists depending on the ploidy of the individual or vegetative stage:

- Haploid cycle (as in most fungi): the individual is haploid and differentiates through mitosis into haploid gametes, which fuse into a zygote that immediately undergoes meiosis to generate new haploid individuals. This is the case for some green algae (such as volvocine algae), most dinoflagellates, dictyostelids, some metamonads, and apicomplexans. Zygnematophytes, a group of green algae, fuse vegetative cells directly by conjugation instead of producing gametes.

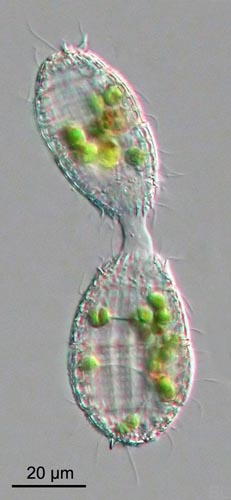
Two ciliates join during conjugation to exchange their haploid nuclei via a cytoplasmic bridge.

- Diploid cycle (as in animals): the individual is diploid and undergoes meiosis to generate haploid gametes, which fuse into a zygote that develops as a new individual. This is the case for some metamonads, heliozoans, many green algae, diatoms, and labyrinthulids. Ciliates are also diploid, but instead of producing gametes they divide their micronucleus into two haploid nuclei, exchange one of them by conjugation with another ciliate, and fuse the two nuclei into a new diploid nucleus.
- Haplo-diploid cycle (as in land plants): there are two alternating generations of individuals. One, the diploid agamont (or sporophyte), undergoes meiosis to generate haploid cells (called spores) that develop into the other generation, the haploid gamont (or gametophyte). The gamont then generates gametes by mitosis, which fuse to form the diploid zygote that develops into the agamont. This is the case for many foraminifera and many algae. Depending on the relative growth and lifespan of one generation compared to the other, life cycles may be haploid-dominant, diploid-dominant, or with equally dominant generations. Brown algae exhibit the full range of these modes. Many red algae have a three-generational cycle with a carposporophyte, whose spores germinate into a tetrasporophyte, whose spores develop into the gametophyte.

==== Factors inducing sexual cycles ====
Free-living protists tend to reproduce sexually under stressful conditions, such as starvation or heat shock. Oxidative stress, which leads to DNA damage, also appears to be an important factor in the induction of sex in protists.

Several protists synchronize their life cycles (namely the formation or release of gametes) according to environmental factors such as nutrient or light levels, resulting in synchronization with the day-night cycle, the lunar cycle, or the seasons. The malaria agent Plasmodium falciparum synchronizes its life cycle with the host's levels of melatonin.

=== Cycles in pathogenic protists ===
Pathogenic protists tend to have extremely complex life cycles that involve multiple forms of the organism, some of which reproduce sexually and others asexually. The stages that feed and multiply inside the host are generally known as trophozoites (from Greek trophos 'nutrition' and zoia 'animals'), but the names of each stage vary depending on the protist group (e.g., sporozoites and merozoites in apicomplexans; primary and secondary zoospores in phytomyxeans).

Some pathogenic protists undergo asexual reproduction in a wide variety of organisms—which act as secondary or intermediate hosts—but can undergo sexual reproduction only in the primary or definitive host (e.g., Toxoplasma gondii in felids such as domestic cats). Others, such as Leishmania, are capable of performing syngamy in the secondary vector. In apicomplexans, sexual reproduction is obligatory for parasite transmission.

Despite undergoing sexual reproduction, it is unclear how frequently there is genetic exchange between different strains of pathogenic protists, as most populations may be clonal lines that rarely exchange genes with other members of their species.

== Habitats ==
Protist diversity, as detected through environmental DNA surveys, is vast in every sampled environment, but it is mostly undescribed. The richest protist communities appear in soils, followed by oceanic and lastly freshwater habitats, mostly as part of the plankton.

Soil-dwelling protist communities are ecologically the richest, possibly due to the complex and highly dynamic distribution of water in the sediment, which creates extremely heterogenous environmental conditions. The constantly changing environment promotes the activity of only one part of the community at a time, while the rest remains inactive; this phenomenon promotes high microbial diversity in prokaryotes as well as protists. Cercozoan amoeboflagellates like the glissomonads and cercomonads are among the most abundant soil protists, their morphological variability well suited for foraging between soil particles. Testate amoebae are also acclimated to the soil environment, as their shells protect against desiccation. Most soil algae are stramenopiles and green algae. Fungus-like protists and slime molds (e.g., oomycetes, myxomycetes, acrasids) are present abundantly as saprotrophs. The major parasites in land are the animal-associated apicomplexans and the plant-associated oomycetes and plasmodiophorids.

Marine protists are present in almost the entire range of oceanic conditions, mostly dominating the photic zone. Their abundance depends mostly on the availability of inorganic nutrients, rather than temperature or sunlight, and may vary seasonally. They are most abundant in coastal waters that receive nutrient-rich run-off from land, and areas where nutrient-rich deep ocean water reaches the surface, namely the upwelling zones in the Arctic Ocean and along continental margins. Radiolarians are widespread as the most dominant marine consumers. Macroalgae (namely red algae, green algae and brown algae), unlike plankton, generally require a fixation point, which limits their marine distribution to coastal waters, and particularly to rocky substrates. Some communities of seaweeds exist adrift on the ocean surface, serving as a refuge and means of dispersal for associated organisms. Parasitoids such as Syndiniales are abundant pathogens in oceans.

Freshwater protist communities are characterized by a higher beta diversity (highly heterogeneous between samples) than soil and marine plankton. The high diversity can be a result of the hydrological dynamic of recruiting organisms from different habitats through extreme floods. The most abundant groups in freshwater phytoplankton are golden algae, cryptophytes and dinoflagellates, whereas euglenids are the most abundant heterotrophs.

=== Extreme habitats ===
Examples of extremophilic protists
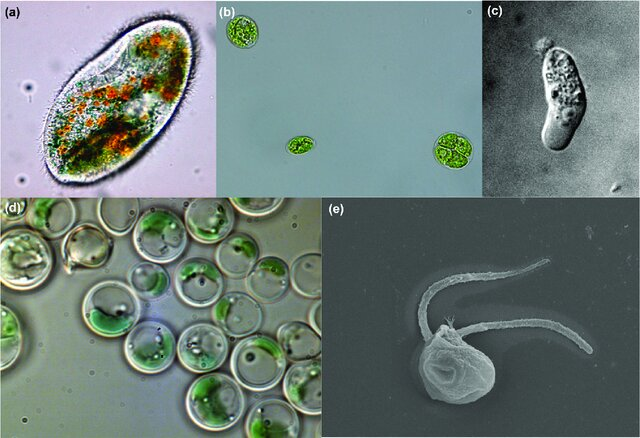
a) Frontonia, a ciliate from soda lakes in Kenya.
b) Chlamydomonas pitschmanii, a green alga from hot spring soils.
c) Tetramitus thermacidophilus, an amoeboflagellate from an acidic geothermal lake in California.
d) Galdieria sulphuraria, a thermoacidophilic red alga.
e) Halocafeteria seosinensis, a flagellate from a saltern in Korea.

Protists can survive a broad range of extreme conditions, including extreme temperatures (thermophiles or psychrophiles), salinity (halophiles), pH (alkaliphiles or acidophiles), and even high concentrations of heavy metals. Most of the extremophilic eukaryotes are algae, specifically chlorophytes, followed by fungi. Other extremophile-abundant groups are heterolobose amoebae, red algae, stramenopiles, and ciliates.

Eukaryotic algae are well-known to withstand high temperatures; for example, the red alga Cyanidioschyzon merolae persists up to 60 °C, similarly to the most extreme thermophilic fungi. Lesser-known thermophilic amoebae and amoeboflagellates (e.g., Echinamoeba thermarum) are repeatedly found in hot environments, including artificially heated systems. While less successful than algae or amoebae, ciliates have also been found in hydrothermal vents up to 52 °C. This is still lower than prokaryotes, some of which grow above 80 °C. In extremely cold habitats, like snow and the Arctic Ocean, diatoms and green algae are the dominant phototrophs.

In terms of pH and salinity, protists can withstand similar extremes relative to prokaryotes and fungi, and also persist in polyextreme environments (polyextremophiles). The record for acidophily is also C. merolae, with an observed minimum growth of pH 0. Besides red algae, some species of green algae and amoeboflagellates are found in high-temperature, low-pH geothermal springs. Alkaliphilic protists, primarily represented by ciliates, resist up to pH 10.48, higher than the most alkalophilic bacterium.

Protists are remarkably successful in extreme salinity due to their salt-out strategy, which consists of accumulating organic solutes in the cell instead of ions to counterbalance the hypertonic environment. Examples include the alga Dunaliella salina and the flagellate Halocafeteria seosinensis, which is able to tolerate up to 36.3% salinity, higher than the maximum reported in bacteria (35%) and fungi (30%).

=== Biomass comparison ===
Protists are abundant in nearly all habitats. They contribute an estimated 4 gigatons (Gt) to Earth's biomass—double that of animals (2 Gt), but less than 1% of the total. Combined, protists, animals, archaea (7 Gt), and fungi (12 Gt) make up less than 10% of global biomass, with plants (450 Gt) and bacteria (70 Gt) dominating.

== Ecological roles ==
Protists are indispensable to modern ecosystems worldwide. They also have been the only eukaryotic component of all ecosystems for much of Earth's history, which allowed them to evolve a vast functional diversity that explains their critical ecological significance. They are essential as primary producers, as intermediates in multiple trophic levels, as key regulating parasites or parasitoids, and as partners in diverse symbioses.

=== Primary producers ===
Phototrophic protists are the main contributors to the biomass and primary production in nearly all aquatic environments, as part of the phytoplankton. (Note: Given the importance of aquatic algae, the equally abundant soil algae may provide a larger contribution to the global carbon cycle than previously thought, but the magnitude of their carbon fixation has yet to be quantified.) Altogether, they are responsible for almost half of the global primary production. They are the main providers of much of the energy and organic matter used by other trophic levels, including essential nutrients such as fatty acids. Macroalgae support numerous herbivorous animals, especially benthic ones, as both food and refuge from predators.

=== Consumers ===
Diagram of the soil food web, taking into account the diverse roles of protists as not just bacterivores, but also mycophages and omnivores. Arrows show the flow of nutrients.

Phagotrophic protists are the most diverse functional group in all ecosystems. In the trophic webs of soils, protists are the main consumers of both bacteria and fungi, the two main pathways of nutrient flow towards higher trophic levels. As bacterial grazers, they have a significant role in the foodweb: they excrete nitrogen in the form of NH_{3}, making it available to plants and other microbes.

As part of the plant-associated microbiomes (rhizosphere near the roots, phyllosphere on the leaves), predatory protists such as cercomonads regulate the populations of bacteria and fungi, indirectly improving plant health and growth. They can also have a more direct impact by releasing proteins with antimicrobial activity.

=== Decomposers ===
Necrophagy (the degradation of dead biomass) among microbes is mainly attributed to bacteria and fungi, but protists have a still poorly recognized role as decomposers with specialized lytic enzymes. In marine and estuarine environments, the well-studied thraustochytrids (a type of labyrinthulomycetes) are relevant saprotrophs that decompose various substrates, including dead plant and animal tissue. Various ciliates and testate amoebae scavenge on dead animals. Some nucleariid amoebae specifically consume the contents of dead or damaged cells, but not healthy cells. However, all these examples are of facultative necrophages that also feed on live prey. In contrast, the cercozoan family Viridiraptoridae, present in shallow bog waters, are obligate necrophages of dead algae, potentially fulfilling an important role in cleaning up the environment and releasing nutrients for other microbes.

=== Parasites and pathogens ===
Parasitic protists compose around 15–20% of all environmental DNA samples in marine and soil ecosystems, but only around 5% in freshwater systems, where chytrid fungi likely fill that ecological niche. They are significant parasites of animals, land plants, fungi, and even of other protists. In plants, oomycetes are the most economically important pathogens (e.g., potato blight), but other lesser studied lineages are known to infect plants, such as phytomyxids (e.g., clubroot), labyrinthulids, and trypanosomatids of the genus Phytomonas.

Parasitic protists are among the most well-known human pathogens, causing diseases such as malaria, toxoplasmosis, amoebic meningoencephalitis, sleeping sickness, leishmaniasis, and several diarrheal illnesses like amoebiasis, cryptosporidiosis, Cyclosporiasis, and giardiasis. Several amoebae are amphizoic, normally free-living but capable of infection.

While parasitic protists are largely studied as protozoa, some are algae, such as the green alga Cephaleuros virescens which infects plant leaves. Hundreds of red algae species parasitize on other red algae, usually closely related species.

Certain non-parasitic protists can still be toxic to aquatic animals during periods of excessive growth, either by the release of potent toxins, the depletion of oxygen in the water, or mechanical damage to gills from piercing structures (like the skeletons of silicoflagellates). These phenomena are known as harmful algal blooms, sometimes causing water discoloration (red tides). The most common agents are diatoms and dinoflagellates. When toxins are involved, they can reach human consumption, leading to fish or shellfish poisoning like ciguatera.

=== Mutualists and commensals ===
Many protists live as endosymbionts in a non-parasitic association, providing their hosts with nutritional advantages. Microalgae, namely zoochlorellae (green algae) and zooxanthellae (dinoflagellates, haptophytes and ochrophytes), are widespread endobionts of other protists, especially foraminifers, radiolarians and ciliates, but also of animals. The association of zooxanthellae with corals is extensively studied and valued for its importance in reef ecosystems. Climate warming leads to the loss of zooxanthellae, which manifests as coral bleaching and death of the coral hosts. Some molluscs like the giant clams also harbor zooxanthellae. Sloths are the only mammals with green algae as epibionts on their fur; the hypothesized benefits range from camouflage to sunscreen-like protection or nutritional supplements.

Heterotrophic protists are prevalent members of the gut microbiome of animals, although research has focused almost exclusively on gut bacteria. The giant metamonad flagellates found in the hindgut of termites and cockroaches allow them to digest wood. This is an obligate mutualism, as termites will starve if cleaned of these protists. However most gut protists are commensals, such as the ciliates abundantly present in the rumen of ruminants, or the ciliate-like opalinids that inhabit amphibian and reptile guts.

=== Biogeochemical cycles ===
Marine protists have a fundamental impact on biogeochemical cycles, particularly the carbon cycle. As phytoplankton, they fix as much carbon as all terrestrial plants combined. Shells of biomineralizing marine protists accumulate as sediment that forms various geological features, such as chalk deposits, made of coccoliths, or sand stars, the remains of star-shaped foraminifers. Soil protists, particularly testate amoebae, contribute to the silica cycle as much as forest trees through the biomineralization of their shells.

== Evolution and fossil record ==
Prior to the existence of animals, land plants and fungi, all eukaryotes were protists. As such, questions regarding their origin and evolution are questions on protists. Because of the scarce fossil record prior to ca. 750 Mya, dating of early events in eukaryotic evolution relies primarily on molecular clock reconstructions. Eukaryotic cells first evolved from archaea some time during the late Archean eon (ca. 3 billion years ago), forming a lineage that eventually gave rise to the last eukaryotic common ancestor (LECA) with the traits associated with crown-group (modern) eukaryotes, namely mitochondria and a complex endomembrane system. Estimations on the date of LECA range from 2.4 to 1.6 billion years ago, during the Paleoproterozoic, leaving a considerably long gap of stem-group (extinct) eukaryotes with intermediate traits.

Palæoproterozoic
Mesoproterozoic
Neoproterozoic
Palæozoic
Mesozoic
Cenozoic
Siderian
Rhyacian
Orosirian
Statherian
Calymmian
Ectasian
Stenian
Tonian
Cryogenian
Ediacaran
Cambrian
Ordovician
Devonian
Carboniferous
Permian
Triassic
Jurassic
Cretaceous
Paleogene
Neogene
Quaternary
Possible stem-group eukaryotes
Acritarchs
Dinoflagellates
dinosterane
Red algae
Rafatazmia, Ramathallus
Bangiomorpha
Green algae
Proterocladus
Holomycota
Ourasphaira
Holozoa
Bicellum
Amoebozoa
vase-shaped microfossils
Cercozoa
vase-shaped microfossils
Foraminifera
Radiolaria
Euglenida
Moyeria
Haptophyta
Ciliates
Diatoms
Calyptosporium
Silicoflagellates
Parabasalia
Trypanosomatida
Apicomplexa
Synurophyceae
Boring Billion
│
−2500
│
−2400
│
−2300
│
−2200
│
−2100
│
−2000
│
−1900
│
−1800
│
−1700
│
−1600
│
−1500
│
−1400
│
−1300
│
−1200
│
−1100
│
−1000
│
−900
│
−800
│
−700
│
−600
│
−500
│
−400
│
−300
│
−200
│
−100
│
0
Scale in million years ago, with geological eras and periods according to the International Chronostratigraphic Chart. Legend:
accepted fossil record (including name of earliest fossil), putative fossil record, biochemical signatures, molecular clock estimate, ^{†}major extinctions.

=== First fossils and stem eukaryotes ===
Fossils before 1 billion years ago are limited and cannot be confidently assigned to modern eukaryotic groups. As such, they are interpreted as potential stem-group eukaryotes, based on their large cell sizes and complex shapes that would still require diagnostic eukaryotic features such as a cytoskeleton and an endomembrane system. The earliest potential stem eukaryotes reach back to the late Paleoproterozoic (2–1.6 billion years ago). Examples of these are Leiosphaeridia, Tappania, Shuiyousphaeridium, and Grypania. There are also two fossils of putative red algae, Ramathallus and Rafatazmia.

Sterols, common to modern eukaryotic membranes (e.g., cholesterol), appear comparatively late in the fossil record in comparison to the molecular dating of LECA, suggesting that crown-group eukaryotes flourished relatively late. Instead, stem eukaryotes may have produced simpler protosterols that require less oxygen during biosynthesis. The advanced sterols of modern eukaryotes, although metabolically expensive, likely provided numerous advantages through increased membrane flexibility, such as resilience to osmotic shock during desiccation-rehydration cycles, extreme temperatures, oxidative damage, and UV light exposure, allowing them to colonize diverse and harsh environments (e.g., mudflats, rivers, agitated shorelines and land). In contrast, stem eukaryotes remained in low-oxygen marine waters, although at higher abundances.

=== Radiation of crown eukaryotes ===
In absence of a reliable fossil record, hypotheses regarding the early evolution of crown eukaryotes are based on the phylogenomics of modern protists coupled with morphological and ecological comparisons. LECA is widely hypothesized as having a typical excavate morphology, with two flagella and a ventral groove used for feeding on bacteria by phagocytosis. In addition, LECA was likely a facultative anaerobe which could live in both aerobic and, more commonly during the Proterozoic, anaerobic environments.

Following LECA, a series of ecological and evolutionary innovations took place in the span of 300 million years, between the Paleoproterozoic and Mesoproterozoic, resulting in a rapid radiation that originated all major eukaryotic supergroups. These events can be outlined in four broad stages. (Note: The exact temporal relationship between these proposed stages is currently impossible to determine. They merely represent the sequence of ecological and evolutionary innovations that took place between LECA and modern eukaryotes. The second and third stages might have overlapped.) Firstly, the direct descendants of LECA, excavate-like flagellates feeding on bacteria by altering water currents, diversify and give rise to the most basal groups such as the anaerobic metamonads and the aerobic jakobids. Secondly, surface-associated protists emerge with the development of gliding motility and the cell plasticity to form thin pseudopodia, resulting in lineages such as ancyromonads, apusomonads and CRuMs (i.e., the podiates), which pick bacteria directly off of surfaces. The third stage involves the lineage Diaphoretickes, in which agile swimming motility was prioritized and several adaptations led to an active predatory lifestyle (e.g., provorans, telonemids) hunting both bacteria and, for the first time, other eukaryotes. In response, some prey might have developed stronger pellicles, as seen in rigifilids and apusomonads. Lastly, the fourth stage saw the appearance of both "super-predators" capable of hunting other eukaryovores (as in the SAR lineages), and more specialized bacterivores with amoeboid movement (as in amoebozoans and opisthokonts), resulting in a "mature" biosphere. Early amoebozoans of the Mesoproterozoic adapted to grazing on microbial mats, the dominant food source at the time, resulting in multiple losses of flagella and large amoeboid bodies.

Below is a consensus phylogenetic tree of eukaryotes, including all major supergroups that originated from this time period. The position of the root is still debated, hence the polytomy. (Note: Some analyses place the root of the eukaryote tree within or next to Metamonada, while others split the tree between a branch leading to Diaphoretickes and Discoba ('Diphoda') and a branch leading to Podiata ('Opimoda').) Excavate groups are marked *.

- LECA
  - - Diaphoretickes
      - - SAR
        - Telonemia (Note: Telonemia may be more closely related to SAR, forming the hypothesized TSAR clade, or it may branch with Haptista instead.)
        - Haptista
      - Disparia
      - - Pancryptista
        - Archaeplastida
  - Discoba*
  - Metamonada*
  - Malawimonadida*
  - - Ancyromonadida
    - Podiata
      - CRuMs
      - Amorphea
        - Amoebozoa
        - Obazoa
          - Breviatea
          - - Apusomonadida
            - Opisthokonta

=== Neoproterozoic expansion ===
The presence of modern eukaryotes in the fossil record remained modest (Note: There is a considerable fossil gap between the first stem eukaryotes of the late Paleoproterozoic and early Mesoproterozoic (~1.6 billion years ago) and the first crown eukaryotes of the Neoproterozoic (~1 billion years ago). This gap is known as the 'boring billion'.) until the Tonian period (1000–720 million years ago), when biomarker molecules and microfossils became abundant. Fossils at around 1000 million years ago (Mya) include the oldest specimens that are assigned with high confidence to crown eukaryotes. Bangiomorpha and Proterocladus are the oldest multicellular red and green algae, respectively. The oldest fossils of opisthokonts are Ourasphaira giraldae, interpreted as the earliest fungus, and Bicellum brasieri, the earliest holozoan, showing traits associated with animal-like multicellularity such as different cell types. Heterotrophic protists appear abundantly throughout the Tonian, as exemplified by the vase-shaped microfossils (780–720 Mya), interpreted as marine testate amoebae and as such composing the oldest representatives of filose (Cercozoa) and lobose (Amoebozoa) amoebae. Other microfossils include some poorly preserved tubular shells from 716–635 Mya rocks.

As oxygen levels rose, crown eukaryotes may have outcompeted stem eukaryotes, expanding into oxygen-rich marine environments that supported an aerobic metabolism enabled by their mitochondria. Stem eukaryotes may have gone extinct due to competition and the extreme climatic changes of the Cryogenian glaciations (720–635 Mya) and subsequent global warming, cementing the dominance of crown eukaryotes which began to appear abundantly in this era, fueled by the proliferation of algae. After the Gaskiers glaciation of the Late Ediacaran (ca. 579 Mya), fossils of heterotrophic protists diversify further. Some fossils at 548 Mya, similar to vase-shaped microfossils, are interpreted as the oldest traces of foraminifers (e.g., Protolagena), but their foraminiferal affinity is doubtful.

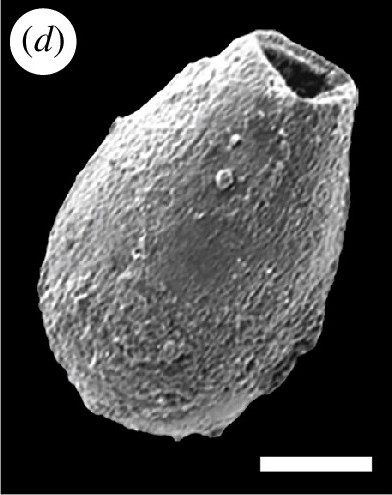
A vase-shaped microfossil c. 742 Mya resembling modern testate amoebae

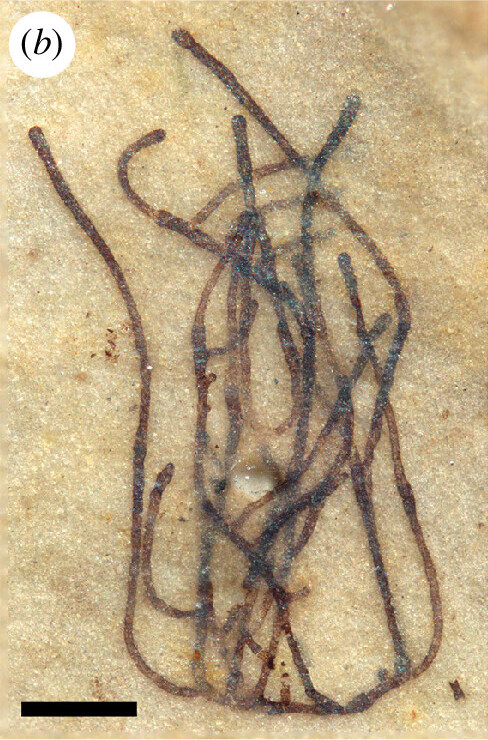
Proterocladus, the oldest fossil of green algae

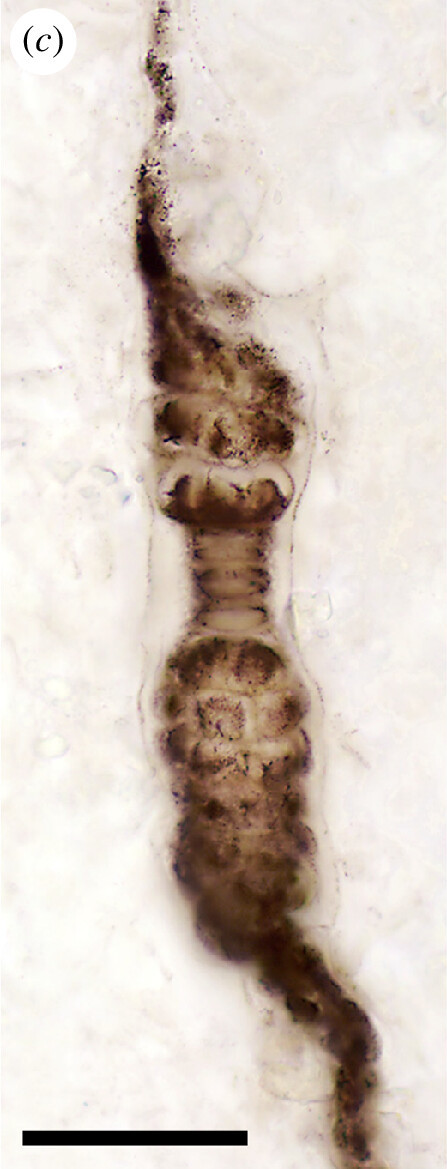
Bangiomorpha, the oldest fossil of red algae

=== Phanerozoic diversifications and major events ===
At the very start of the Paleozoic era, the first definitive fossils of radiolarian and foraminiferal shells are found, alongside the first small shelly fauna. Following the Cambrian explosion of animals, the Precambrian microbe-dominated ecosystems were replaced by primarily benthic and nekto-benthic communities, with most marine organisms limited to the depths of shallow water environments. Mirroring the animal radiation, there was a radiation of phytoplanktonic protists (acritarchs) around 520–510 Ma, followed by a decrease in diversity around 500 Ma. The surviving acritarchs expanded in diversity and morphological innovation due to a decrease in predation from benthic animals, which suffered extinction due to various proposed environmental factors such as anoxia. Both phytoplankton and zooplankton (e.g., radiolarians) flourished, as signaled by an increase of organic carbon buried in the sediment known as the SPICE event (~497 Mya). This abundant biomass supported a second animal radiation known as the Great Ordovician Biodiversification Event. This period is also known as the 'Ordovician Plankton Revolution' due to the significant diversification of planktonic protists. Starting in the middle Ordovician, the earliest fossils of eugelnids (Moyeria) appear.

In the Devonian period, the first fossils of freshwater arcellinid testate amoebae are found (e.g., Palaeoleptochlamys, Cangweulla), as well as various types of freshwater green algae, including charophytes, volvocaceans and desmids, and some fossils that might represent glaucophytes. Some benthic foraminifera acquired the ability of calcifying, and particularly the giant fusulinids became the dominant fossilizable protists. This period also includes the molecular origin of haptophytes (~310 Mya) and silicoflagellates (397–382 Mya), which did not leave fossil traces until later in the Mesozoic. After the Late Devonian extinction (372 Mya), nassellarian-like radiolarians appeared for the first time, with a unique body plan among marine protists.

During the Carboniferous period, no new fossilizable protists originated despite the major environmental changes. However, radiolarian diversity and productivity increased, causing the accumulation of large amounts of biosiliceous sediment (chert) worldwide until the Early Cretaceous. Around the Capitanian mass extinction event (262–259 Mya) of the Permian period, coccolithophores genetically diverged from the rest of haptophytes, possibly as a response to a reduction in atmospheric oxygen, and there was a faunal turnover from larger to smaller fusulinids. Spumellarian radiolarians appear in the latest Permian.

The Permian-Triassic extinction event (~251.9 Mya) caused the extinction of many radiolarians, which manifests as a gap in the chert record. The Triassic period saw the acceleration of radiolarian diversity and the appearance of several groups of calcaerous nannofossils, including dinocysts, the oldest identifiable coccolithophore Crucirhabdus minutus, and the oldest fossils of Phaeodaria. There's a variety of protozoa, including soft-bodied ciliates, and filamentous algae found in amber from the Late Triassic (220–230 Ma).

Around the Early–Middle Jurassic, after the global Toarcian Oceanic Anoxic Event there was a diversification of dinoflagellates and coccolithophores, in both species and abundance. This interval also saw the completion of a symbiosis between Acantharia radiolarians and lineages of Phaeocystis haptophytes, as well as the appearance of planktonic foraminifera. The period of low atmospheric oxygen ends in the Aptian-Albian boundary during the Early Cretaceous, and the first fossils of diatoms and silicoflagellates appear. Samples of amber from around 100 Ma contain the oldest fossil records of apicomplexans (particularly malarian agents and gregarines), trypanosomes, and metamonads—particularly mutualistic parabasalids of cockroaches, representing the earliest record of mutualism between protists and animals.

Across the Mesozoic era, coccolithophores, dinoflagellates and later diatoms became the dominating eukaryotic producers in oceans until today, as opposed to cyanobacteria and green algae which dominated earlier. Their diversification caused an accelerated transfer of primary production into higher trophic levels, which in turn caused the animal "Mesozoic marine revolution", characterized by the appearance of widespread predation among most invertebrate phyla.

The Cenozoic era began with another extinction event (~66 Ma) that caused the replacement of mesozoic forms of dinoflagellates, foraminifers, coccolithophores, and silicoflagellates with forms that dominate marine habitats today. Right after this event, putative ebridians begin appearing in the fossil record (e.g., Ammodochium), but the oldest reliable ebridian fossils belong to the upper middle Eocene (42–33.7 Ma). Around this time, the oldest fossils of synurids appear (~49–40 Ma). Following the Middle Eocene Climatic Optimum (~40 Ma), diatoms became the dominant agents of marine silicon precipitation as opposed to radiolarians, and the fossil record shows the first raphid diatoms and collodarians.

== See also ==
- Protistology
- Glossary of protistology
- Protist locomotion
