= Last eukaryotic common ancestor =

Common ancestor of eukaryotes

Reconstruction of LECA. Key: 1) Nucleus with nucleolus and eu/heterochromatin 2) Endoplasmic reticulum 3) Peroxisome 4) Endo/lysosome, ESCRT system 5) Golgi apparatus 6) Endo/exocytosis, actin-based 7) Pseudo/Filopodium 8) Sterol-based membrane; G3P + ester bond phospholipids 9) Microtubule-based cytoskeleton and organising centre 10) Basal bodies 11) Vacuoles 12) Iron-sulphur cluster biosynthesis via the CIA system 13) Mitochondria 14) Flagella, microtubule-based

The last eukaryotic common ancestor (LECA) is the hypothetical most recent common ancestor of all living eukaryotes – organisms whose cells have a nucleus, around 2 billion years ago. This followed the appearance some 3.5-4 billion years ago of the last universal common ancestor (LUCA), a much smaller cell which had the genetic code but no nucleus, and which gave rise to the first two domains of life, the Bacteria and the Archaea. The process by which the LECA came into being, eukaryogenesis, is not understood in detail, but is thought to have involved symbiogenesis, the coming together of an archaean and a bacterium which formed the cell's mitochondria.

The LECA's structure and function have been reconstructed by comparing the genomes of modern eukaryotes. This has led biologists to propose that the LECA was a complex cell with a nucleus with a nucleolus and eu/heterochromatin, an endoplasmic reticulum, peroxisomes, endo- and lysosomes, the ESCRT system, a Golgi apparatus, actin-based endo- and exocytosis, pseudopodia or filopodia, sterol-based membranes, G3P + ester bond phospholipids, a microtubule-based cytoskeleton with an organising centre, basal bodies, vacuoles, iron-sulphur cluster biosynthesis via the CIA system, mitochondria, and microtubule-based flagella.

The LECA had mechanisms for reshuffling its genetic material, and was likely able to reproduce sexually and repair damage to its DNA. It was likely able to detect and repair damage to its cell membrane, using mechanisms including calcium signalling and contraction of muscle-like actomyosin proteins.

== Context ==
Life arose on Earth once it had cooled enough for oceans to form. That developed into the last universal common ancestor (LUCA), an organism which had ribosomes and the genetic code, some 3.5-4 billion years ago. LUCA gave rise to the first two domains of life, the bacteria and the archaea. From among these small-celled ancestors arose the eukaryotes, with a much wider range of cell sizes, and more complex cells with nuclei, a cytoskeleton, and an endomembrane system. The eukaryotes form a third domain that contains all complex cells and most types of multicellular organisms, including the animals, plants, and fungi.

The last eukaryotic common ancestor (LECA) is the hypothetical most recent common ancestor of all living eukaryotes, around 2 billion years ago, and was most likely a biological population.

It is not known how the bacteria and archaea gave rise to the LECA (and hence to all later eukaryotes) in the process of eukaryogenesis, as the fossil record of ancient single-celled organisms, whether fossil prokaryotes or early eukaryotes, is fragmentary. Instead, biologists have focused on reconstructing the properties of the LECA from what is known of the genomes of different lineages of modern eukaryotes.

== Structure and function ==
=== Organelles ===
Based on the genomes of existing eukaryotes, it is believed that LECA was a single cell with a nucleus, at least one centriole and cilium, facultatively aerobic mitochondria, sex (meiosis and syngamy), a dormant cyst with a cell wall of chitin or cellulose, and peroxisomes. All of these features are unique to the eukaryotes. Some modern eukaryotes such as myxomycetes are syncitial, with multiple nuclei: this has been suggested as a feature of the LECA.

It has been proposed that the LECA fed by phagocytosis, engulfing other organisms; this has been disputed on phylogenomic grounds, not least because phagocytosis appears to have arisen multiple times rather than being ancestral to all eukaryotes. In a 2013 study, Lila Koumandou and colleagues described LECA on molecular grounds as having "spectacular cellular complexity". Its cell was divided into compartments such as the Golgi apparatus, the endoplasmic reticulum, and the nuclear envelope. The LECA appears to have inherited a set of endosomal sorting complex (ESCRT) proteins that enable membranes to be remodelled, including pinching off vesicles to form endosomes.

=== Genetic mechanisms ===
Unlike prokaryotes, eukaryotes' mechanisms for transcribing DNA into RNA, and then for translating the RNA into proteins, are separated, permitting extensive RNA processing and allowing the expression of genes to become more complex. According to a 2013 paper by Koumandou and colleagues, the LECA had mechanisms for reshuffling its genetic material, and possibly for manipulating its own evolvability. All of these gave the LECA "a compelling cohort of selective advantages".

=== Eukaryotic sex ===
Sex in eukaryotes is a composite process, consisting of meiosis and fertilisation, which can be coupled to reproduction. Dacks and Roger proposed on the basis of a phylogenetic analysis that facultative sex was likely present in the common ancestor of all eukaryotes. Early in eukaryotic evolution, about 2 billion years ago, organisms needed a solution to the major problem that oxidative metabolism releases reactive oxygen species that damage the genetic material, DNA. Eukaryotic sex provides a process, homologous recombination during meiosis, for using informational redundancy to repair such DNA damage.

=== Response to injury ===
Since several immune mechanisms involved in the response to injury are widely shared among modern eukaryotes, it has been suggested that they were present in the LECA. These mechanisms include receptors, calcium signaling, reactive oxygen species, adenosine triphosphate release, kinase cascades, and oxylipin signaling. Single-celled eukaryotes, such as choanoflagellates, substantially share the pathways found in plants and animals for detecting damage and pathogens. Extracellular adenosine triphosphate is a signal that promotes healing of wounds to the epithelium in animals. The signal is detected by a P2X receptor.

The cell biologist Thibaut Brunet and the molecular biologist Detlev Arendt propose that the LECA possessed a calcium-based wound healing response. They argue that the mechanism's purpose was to detect and heal a potentially fatal opening in the cell membrane. They propose that it worked by detecting an inflow of calcium ions, which provoked a contraction in muscle-like actomyosin proteins. This in turn caused vesicles to fuse with the cell membrane (exocytosis), healing the opening and preventing the cell from splitting open.

How the last eukaryotic common ancestor may have detected and repaired a hole in its membrane

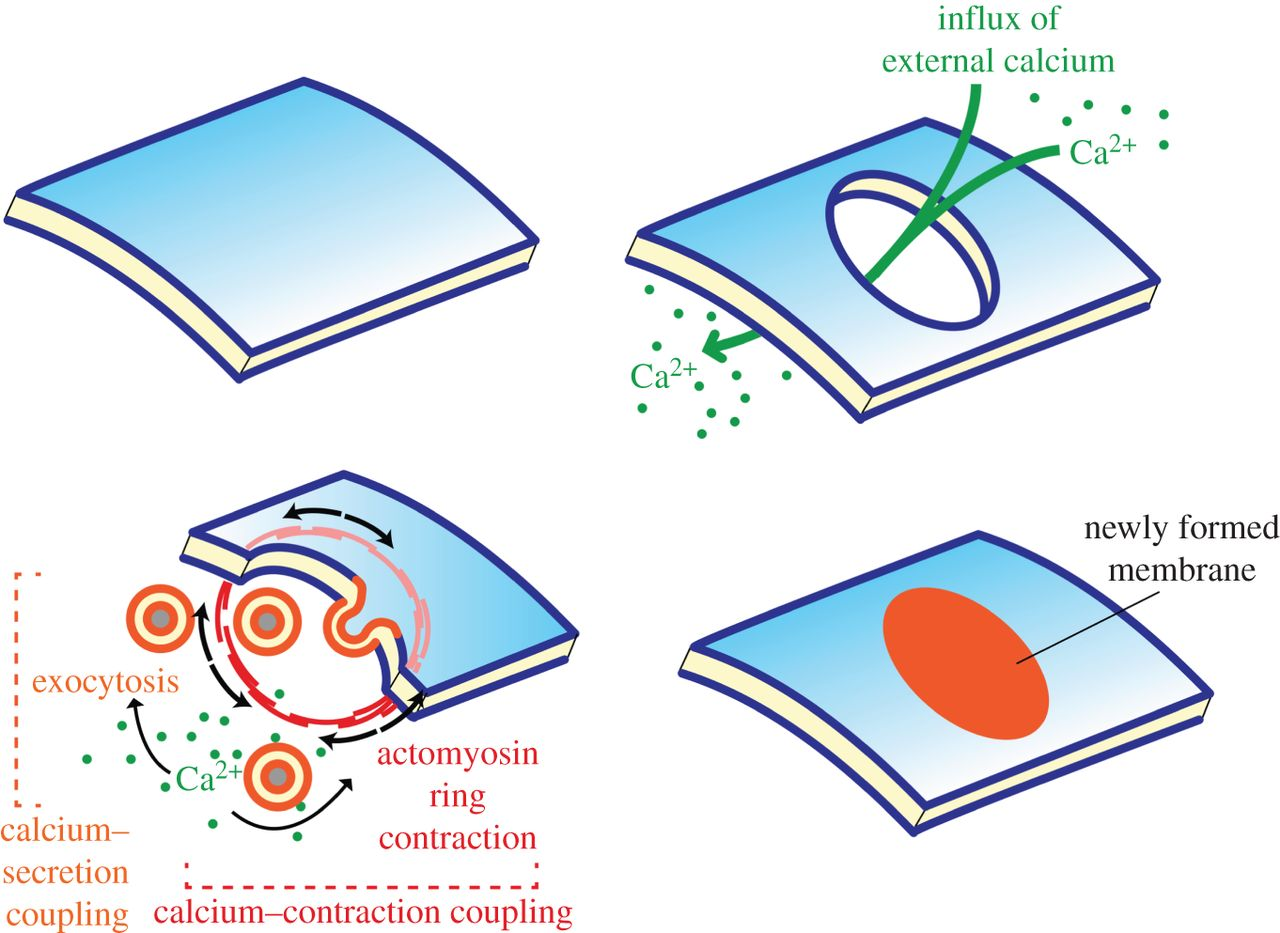

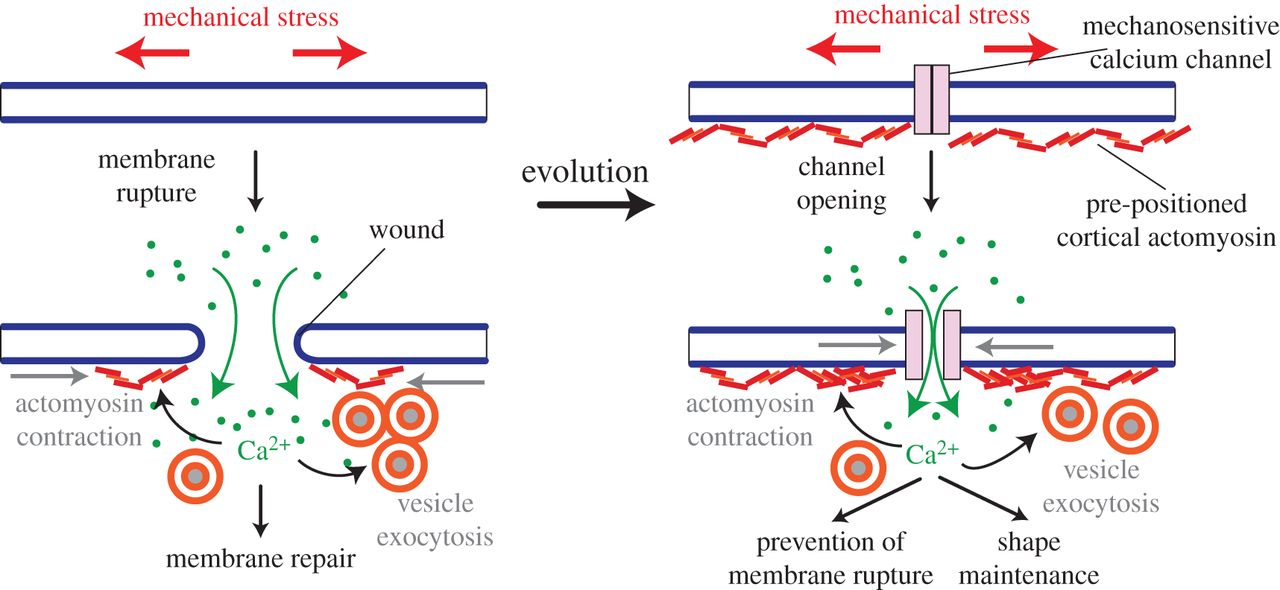
