= CIAO3 =

Protein-coding gene in the species Homo sapiens

Identifiers
- Aliases: CIAO3, HPRN, IOP1, LET1L, PRN, nuclear prelamin A recognition factor like, NAR1, NARFL, cytosolic iron-sulfur assembly component 3
- External IDs: OMIM: 611118; MGI: 1914813; GeneCards: CIAO3

Gene location (Human)
Chr.	Chromosome 16 (human)
Band	16p13.3	Start	729,760 bp
Band	16p13.3	End	741,329 bp

Gene location (Mouse)
Chr.	Chromosome 17 (mouse)
Band	17|17 A3.3	Start	25,992,750 bp
Band	17|17 A3.3	End	26,002,306 bp
RNA expression pattern
Bgee	Human / Mouse (ortholog); Top expressed in: apex of heart; right hemisphere of cerebellum; right frontal lobe; mucosa of transverse colon; right uterine tube; prefrontal cortex; anterior cingulate cortex; skin of leg; anterior pituitary; muscle of thigh / Top expressed in: proximal tubule; right kidney; muscle tissue; quadriceps femoris muscle; muscle of thigh; skeletal muscle tissue; heart; human kidney; granulocyte; pancreas; More reference expression data
BioGPS	n/a
Gene ontology
Molecular function	4 iron, 4 sulfur cluster binding; metal ion binding; NADH dehydrogenase activity; iron-sulfur cluster binding; protein binding
Cellular component	CIA complex
Biological process	response to hypoxia; iron-sulfur cluster assembly; oxygen homeostasis; hematopoietic progenitor cell differentiation; regulation of gene expression
Sources:Amigo / QuickGO
Orthologs
Databases	NCBI: entry; OMA: entry
Species	Human	Mouse
Entrez	64428	67563
Ensembl	ENSG00000103245	ENSMUSG00000002280
UniProt	Q9H6Q4	Q7TMW6
RefSeq (mRNA)	NM_022493; NM_001304799	NM_026238
RefSeq (protein)	NP_001291728; NP_071938	NP_080514
Location (UCSC)	Chr 16: 0.73 – 0.74 Mb	Chr 17: 25.99 – 26 Mb
PubMed search
- Wikidata
View/Edit Human	View/Edit Mouse

Cytosolic iron-sulfur assembly component 3 is a protein that in humans is encoded by the CIAO3 gene (previously NARFL). This protein is part of the Cytosolic Iron–sulfur Assembly (CIA) complex.
