= Svanbergfjellet Formation =

Geologic formation in Svalbard

- Stratigraphic range: late Tonian; ~791.1 Ma
- Type: Formation
- Unit of: Akademikerbreen Group
- Underlies: Draken Formation
- Overlies: Grudievbreen Formation

Location
- Region: Svalbard
- Country: Norway

The Svanbergfjellet Formation is a geologic formation in Svalbard. It preserves eukaryotic fossils dating back to the Late Tonian period, around 790 Ma.

== Paleobiota ==
After Butterfield et al, 1994.

Color key
Taxon	Reclassified taxon	Taxon falsely reported as present	Dubious taxon or junior synonym	Ichnotaxon	Ootaxon	Morphotaxon

Notes
Uncertain or tentative taxa are in small text; ~~crossed out~~ taxa are discredited.

Paleobiota
Genus	Species	Notes	Images
Proterocladus	P. major; P. minor; P. hermannae	Filamentous green algae, another species is the earliest such fossil found	Fossil of P. antiquus, an earlier species from China
Palaeastrum	P. dyptocranum	Filamentous eukaryote, possibly a green alga.	Palaeastrum fossil
Pseudotawuia	P. birenifera	Enigmatic eukaryote, bears two unusual kidney-shaped structures at its tip.	
Tawuia	T. dalensis	Enigmatic eukaryote, possibly an alga.	
Valkyria	V. borealis	Filamentous eukaryote, bears several differentiated cells/cell types, possibly placing it at tissue-grade organisation?	
Cerebrosphaera	C. buickii	Acritarch	
Chuaria	C. sp	Acritarch	Specimen from China
Cymatiosphaeroides	C. kullingii	Acritarch	
Dictyotidium	D. fullerene	Acritarch	
Germinosphaera	G. bispinosa; G. fibrilla; G. jankauskasii	Acritarch	
Goniosphaeridium	G. sp	Acritarch	
Gorgonisphaeridium	G. sp	Acritarch	
Leiosphaeridia	L. crassa; L. jacutica; L. tenuissima; L. wimanii	Acritarch	
Osculosphaera	O. hyalina	Acritarch	
Pterospermopsimorpha	P. pileiformis	Acritarch	
Trachyhystrichosphaera	T. aimika; T. polaris	Acritarch	
Gloeodiniopsis	G. lamellosa	Cyanobacteria	
Eoentophysalis	E. belcherensis; E. croxfordii	Cyanobacteria	
Polybessurus	P. bipartitius	Cyanobacteria	
Obruchevella	O. blandita	Cyanobacteria	
Eosynechococcus	E. moorei	Cyanobacteria	
Sphaerophycus	S. parvum	Cyanobacteria	
Cephalonyx	C. geminatus	Cyanobacteria	Line drawing reconstruction of Cephalonyx sibiriens
Cyanonema	C. sp	Cyanobacteria	
Oscillatoriopsis	O. vermiformis; O. obtusa; O. amadeus; O. longa	Cyanobacteria	Line drawing reconstruction of Oscillatoriopsis
Palaeolyngbya	P. catenata; P. hebeiensis	Cyanobacteria	Line drawing reconstruction of Palaeolyngbya helva
Siphonophycus	S. thulenema; S. septatum; S. robustum; S. typicum; S. kestron; S. solidum	Cyanobacteria	Line drawing reconstruction of Siphonophycus attenuatum
Tortunema	T. wernadskii	Cyanobacteria	Line drawing reconstruction of Tortunema hermanii
Brachypleganon	B. khandanum	Cyanobacteria	
Chlorogloeaopsis	C. zairensis	Cyanobacteria	
Digitus	D. adumbratus	Cyanobacteria	
Myxococcoides	M. minor; M. cantabrigiensis	Cyanobacteria	
Ostiana	O. microcystis	Cyanobacteria	
Palaeosiphonella	P. sp	Cyanobacteria	
