= Mastigont system =

Series of structures found in protists

The Mastigont system is a series of structures found in several Protists such as thrichomonads and amoebae. It is formed by the basal bodies and several other structures composed of fibrils. Their function is not fully understood. The system is studied and visualised mainly through techniques such as plasma membrane extraction, high-voltage electron microscopy, field emission scanning electron microscopy, the cell-sandwich technique, freeze-etching, and immunocytochemistry.

== Composition ==
The main structures that compose the Mastigont system include:

- the pelta-axostyle system, made of microtubules; it supports the cell axis and is involved in karyokinesis. The pelta is a microtubular structure that holds the flagellar canal.
- The costa, a rootlet; it supports flagellar movements and provides an anchoring system for the nucleus and Golgi.
- The parabasal and sigmoid filaments;
- Other filaments.
