= Protosteroid =

A protosteroid is a lipid precursor to modern steroids, which is thought to have been a functional end product in ancient organisms. Protosteroids are biomarkers produced by ancient stem-eukaryote microorganisms of the protosterol biota, as the intermediate compounds created while making crown sterol molecules.

The German-American biochemist and Nobel laureate Konrad Emil Bloch proposed that instead of today's sterols, earlier life forms could have used chemical intermediates in their cells, which he termed "ursterols." In 2023, researchers from the Australian National University and the University of Bremen found protosteroids in rocks that formed 1.6 billion years ago in the Barney Creek Formation in Northern Australia.
