= Protosterol biota =

Group of fossilized microorganisms

The protosterol biota is a group of organisms found in fossilized fats that comprised aquatic protosterol-producing bacteria and ancient deep-branching stem-group eukaryotes from 1.6 to 0.8 billion years ago. They were present in large numbers in the aquatic environments of the seas and seriously affected the Earth's ecosystem at the time. These microorganisms adapted to the much lower oxygen levels of the era and are also thought to have produced protosteroids.

The experts from the Australian National University and the University of Bremen found fossils of fats that were formed 1.6 billion years ago. They found the fossils in the Barney Creek Formation in Northern Australia, near Borroloola, which was covered by seawater. In the findings, the researchers noticed chemical signals that suggested that the molecules may have come from an ancestor of the last common eukaryotic ancestor from which fungi, plants and animals all evolved. The research revealed that eukaryotes already existed on Earth 1.6 billion years ago.
