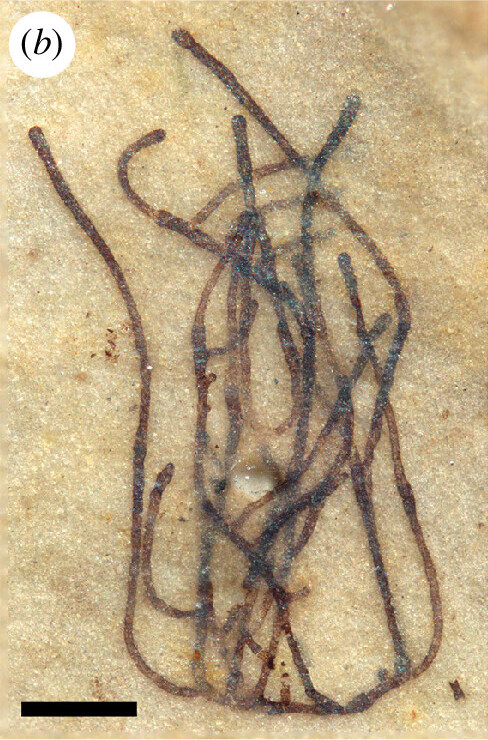
- Fossil of Proterocladus antiquus

Scientific classification
- Kingdom: Plantae
- Division: Chlorophyta
- Subphylum: Chlorophytina
- Class: Ulvophyceae
- Order: Cladophorales
- Family: Siphonocladaceae (?)
- Genus: †Proterocladus; Butterfield et al, 1994

Type species
- Proterocladus major Butterfield et al, 1994

Species
- P. minor Butterfield et al, 1994; P. major Butterfield et al, 1994; P. hermannae Butterfield et al, 1994; P. antiquus Tang et al, 2020

= Proterocladus =

Proterocladus Temporal range: 1000–790 Ma

Proterozoic genus of green algae

Proterocladus is a genus of green algae from the early Neoproterozoic (Tonian) and latest Mesoproterozoic (Stenian), known from the Nanfen Formation and Diaoyutai Formation in China and the Svanbergfjellet Formation in Norway. Alongside this, possible Proterocladus remains are known from the Nonesuch Formation, although their fragmentary state makes it unclear whether they belong to the genus.

== Description ==
The later three species (major, minor, hermannae) are relatively similar, only being differentiated by size and accessory features. All these species have filaments composed of rows of single cells with occasional branches, with the individual cells being cylindrical, psilate (lacking ornamentation) and thin-walled, varying in length but much longer than wide. These cells often have septa (partitions) separating them, and the occasional branches often occur near a septum. The tips of the filaments are either rounded or capitate (ending in a broader tip). P. minor differs from P. major through the septa lacking large constrictions alongside the branches being similar diameters to the main stem. P. hermannae differs from P. minor in turn through having smaller, fewer septa and being larger overall. With the discovery of P. antiquus and over 1000 specimens of the species, several new features were found in the genus, such as multiple-ordered branches, variants in cell shape ranging from circular or club-shaped to cup or barrel-like, an occasional extension on the tips of the cells at ends of filaments, and a disc-like holdfast. P. antiquus itself shows all of these features alongside distinct akinetes (asexual resting spores), but otherwise it resembles P. major in having large constrictions along its septa. Cell size and septa constrictions/frequency are variable in P. antiquus, casting doubt on every other species of Proterocladus since those two characters are the only ones separating each species from the Svanbergfjellet Formation.

== Etymology ==
Proterocladus derives from the Greek words πρότερος ("earlier") and κλάδος ("branch") in reference to its branching habit. The species names major and minor reflect the species' size, whereas hermannae honours Tamara Hermann, for her studies in Proterozoic paleontology. The species name antiquus is Latin for "old", reflecting the fact it is even older than the other Proterocladus species.
