= Iron–sulfur cluster biosynthesis =

Fe-S_biosyn
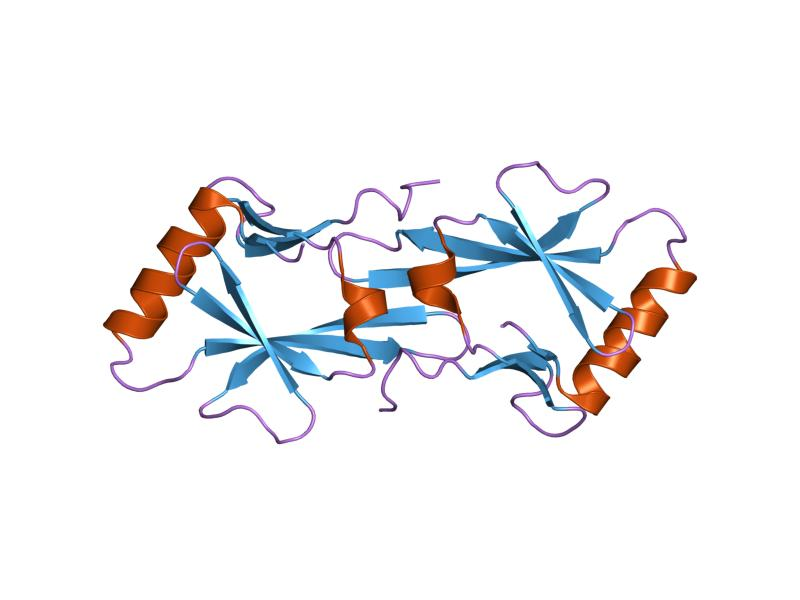
- e.coli isca crystal structure to 2.3 a

Identifiers
- Symbol: Fe-S_biosyn
- Pfam: PF01521
- InterPro: IPR000361
- PROSITE: PDOC00887
- SCOP2: 1nwb / SCOPe / SUPFAM
Available protein structures:
- PDB: IPR000361 PF01521 (ECOD; PDBsum)
- AlphaFold: IPR000361; PF01521

In biochemistry, the iron–sulfur cluster biosynthesis describes the components and processes involved in the biosynthesis of iron–sulfur proteins. The topic is of interest because these proteins are pervasive. The iron sulfur proteins contain iron–sulfur clusters, some with elaborate structures, that feature iron and sulfide centers. One broad biosynthetic task is producing sulfide (S^{2-}), which requires various families of enzymes. Another broad task is affixing the sulfide to iron, which is achieved on scaffolds, which are nonfunctional. Finally these Fe-S cluster is transferred to a target protein, which then become functional.

The formation of iron–sulfur clusters are produced by one of four pathways:

- Nitrogen fixation (NIF) system, which is also found in bacteria that are not nitrogen-fixing.
- Iron–sulfur cluster (ISC) system, in bacteria and mitochondria
- Sulfur assimilation (SUF) system, in plastids and some bacteria

In addition to those three systems, the so-called Cytosolic Iron–sulfur Assembly (CIA) is invoked for cytosolic and nuclear Fe–S proteins.

== Mechanisms ==
The assembly of iron–sulfur clusters cluster begins with the production of the equivalent of a sulfur (sulfur atoms per se are not found in nature). The required sulfur atom is obtained from free cysteine by the action of so-called cysteine desulfurases. One prominent desulfurase is IscS, a pyridoxal phosphate-dependent enzyme. The sulfur atom from the cysteine substrate is transferred to residue Cys-328 of IscS, forming a persulfide:

L-cysteine + [enzyme]-cysteine $\rightleftharpoons$ L-alanine + [enzyme]-S-sulfanylcysteine

The persulfide functional group R-S-S-H functions as a source of "inorganic sulfur" that will be incorporated into Fe-S clusters. Subsequently, IscS transfers this "extra" sulfur to IscU. In addition to IscS and IscU, bacterial Fe-S assembly requires IscA, an 11 kDa protein of uncertain function.

The Suf system for iron–sulfur cluster biosynthesis is generally similar to the Isc system (and the Nif system). The analogy extends to the existence of SufA, SufS, and SufU. The Suf system operates with fewer chaperones.
