= Solarion =

- Video of the sun-like form of S. arienae

Scientific classification
- Domain: Eukaryota
- Clade: Disparia
- Phylum: Caelestes
- Family: Solarionidae; Valt & Čepička in Valt et al. 2025
- Genus: Solarion; Valt & Čepička in Valt et al. 2025
- Species: S. arienae

Binomial name
- Solarion arienae Valt & Čepička in Valt et al. 2025

Genus of eukaryotic microbes

Solarion is a rare genus of eukaryote microbes that inhabits shallow marine low-oxygen sediments. The genus contains a single species, Solarion arienae, which is the only member of the family Solarionidae. Alongside Meteora, they form the phylum Caelestes. Solarion was described in 2025 based on a specimen collected in Croatia, but it may be globally distributed. It is characterized by two distinct life-cycle phases: a globular, sun-like cell with protruding stalks—from which the genus gets its name—and an ellipsoid cell with a single long flagellum and tail. Solarion retains a mitochondrially encoded secA protein, a 'primitive' feature seen in very few other eukaryotes.

== Discovery ==
Video of the flagellate form of S. arienae

In 2011, a sample of marine sediment was collected at a depth of 30 metres (98 ft) off the coast of Brač, a Croatian island near Sumartin. The primary purpose of this collection was to study a marine anaerobic ciliate in a long-term laboratory culture setting. When the ciliates unexpectedly died, the researchers noted the presence of an unusual, smaller microbe, first recognized as a contaminant in the culture. Due to its tiny size and limited motility, it went unnoticed for several years. To better study the microbe, a new culture was established.

=== Naming ===
In 2025, Marek Valt and Ivan Čepička led the description of Solarion arienae as a new genus and species of protist based on the specimens observed in the Croatian culture. A single individual was established as the holotype (name-bearing) specimen, and stained using Protargol for enhanced visualization. It is now accessioned at the National Museum in Prague, Czechia, as P6E 5580. The generic name, Solarion, is derived from the Latin adjective solaris, meaning 'of the sun', combined with the suffix '-ion'. This references the sun-like cell morphology most prevalent for the taxon. The specific name, arienae, references the fictional character Arien in J. R. R. Tolkien's The Silmarillion, who carries the 'vessel of the Sun'.

=== Distribution ===
As the Croatian Solarion specimens went unnoticed for a significant amount of time, it is possible that other cultures or samples collected elsewhere contained this taxon, but were similarly overlooked. To assess the distribution of Solarion, Valt and colleagues used a BLAST (basic local alignment search tool) search—a standard DNA-matching search—based on its 18S rRNA gene, but made no positive identifications. They then used PebbleScout, a tool presented in 2024 that analyzes and indexes extensive nucleotide content, searching for metagenomic and metatranscriptomic matches in the databases. This located a few matches sparsely distributed across the world. This observed rarity can simply be explained by sampling biases, as benthic marine sediments are notably underrepresented in environmental studies. The researchers also speculated on more detailed explanations, depending on whether Solarion is locally abundant but globally rare, or widely distributed but locally scarce. Under the former hypothesis, the microbe would prefer a very specific habitat, restricting it to particular localities. The latter hypothesis posits that Solarion is part of the rare biosphere, a term used to reference the many microbes that are only found in low abundances.

== Description ==
Video of the transformation from flagellate to sun-like form in S. arienae

Solarion is characterized by two distinct stages of its life-cycle, a sun-like and flagellate phase, both of which are comparably tiny and easily distinguishable from all other eukaryotes. The cell is capable of transforming from the flagellate form into the sun-like form, and is the only known member of the supergroup Disparia capable of differentiating between two distinct forms of cell. Genomic analysis indicates that Solarion has nearly all of the genes used in meiosis (cell division producing gametes) and syngamy (gamete cell fusion), lending support to the hypothesis that Solarion undergoes sexual reproduction.

=== Sun-like form ===
The sun-like cell form is the predominant stage observed. These cells are globular, with a diameter of 4.2 μm (± 0.45 μm) observed across 50 separate cells. These cells produce many stalked extrusomes, about 1.9 μm long, that protrude in all directions. Each stalk bears a single unique structure that Valt and colleagues named the celestiosome. Celestiosomes are otherwise known only in the closely related Meteora. These are used to pierce prey (generally bacteria) with a central filament, immobilizing it and allowing it to be drawn toward the cell. The stalks that support the celestiosomes in Solarion are supported by two microtubules rising from a distinctive microtubule-organizing centre (MTOC). In contrast to the pattern in Solarion (a single celestiosome per stalk), the stalks of Meteora bear several celestiosomes.

=== Flagellate form ===
The flagellate cell form is less common, with a larger average size. These cells are ellipsoid, with a length of 5.4 μm (± 1.38 μm) and a width of 3.3 μm (± 0.46 μm) observed across 41 separate cells. These lack the extrusomes characteristic of the sun-like form. Instead, they bear a single long, thin flagellum that inserts apically (at the apex) and projects posterolaterally (out and toward the back). In the observed specimens, the flagellum is 10.4 μm (± 1.66 μm) long. This form also has an immotile (not capable of movement) tail at the posterior (back) end that is shorter (6.6 ± 1.99 μm long) but also slightly thicker than the flagellum. The flagellum moves in a symmetrically sinusoidal wave pattern, pointed posteriorly. The rigid tail only follows the movements of the flagellum.

Some flagellate cells were observed with duplicated flagella or projections pointing posteriorly. This may indicate that this cell form is involved in sexual reproduction, as a cell that divides or a gamete.

== Taxonomy ==
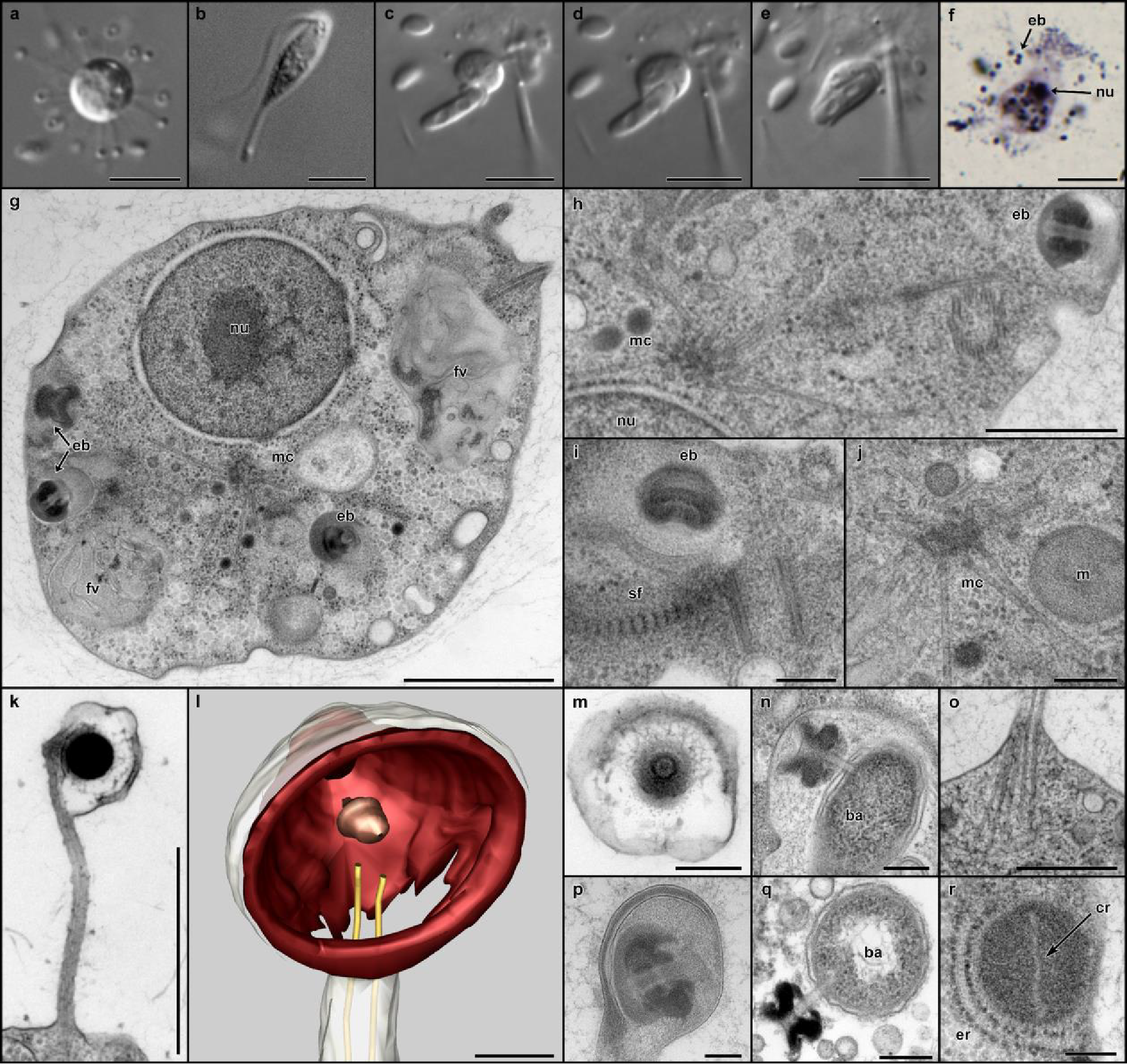
Morphology of S. arienae

In their 2025 description of Solarion, Valt and colleagues used phylogenomic analyses to determine its relationships and affinities with other 'protists'. The researchers formulated a dataset comprising 87 taxa representing the known diversity of eukaryotic organisms, based on 240 protein-coding genes and 77,133 amino acid sites. Their results recovered robust support for the placement of Solarion within the broader clade Diaphoretickes, allowing for the recognition of several new clades. Most specifically, Solarion was placed as the sister taxon to Meteora in a newly-recognized phylum, named Caelestes. This name, referring to a heavenly entity, references the fact that both genera mirror celestial bodies (Solarion having a sun-like shape and Meteora having a meteor-like shape). Caelestes was found to be the sister group to Hemimastigophora in the new clade Membrifera (lit. 'limb-bearing'). Membrifera is sister to Provora (lit. 'devouring voracious protists')—a group described in 2022 based on the recognition of several new taxa—forming the novel supergroup Disparia (lit. 'disparate'). While these relationships are well-supported, the placement of Disparia within Diaphoretickes varies based on what model or dataset is used in the analyses. Using a ELM+C60+G4 model, which excels in predicting sites where rapid evolution occurs, a maximum-likelihood tree was created, recreated in the cladogram below:

- Eukaryota
  - Opimoda
    - - Malawimonadida
      - Ancyromonadida
    - Podiata
      - CRuMs
      - - Amoebozoa
        - Obazoa
  - Diphoda
    - - Discoba
      - Metamonada
    - Diaphoretickes
      - - Archaeplastida
        - Pancryptista
      - - - Haptista
          - - Telonemia
            - SAR
        - Disparia
          - Provora
            - Nebulidia
            - Nibbleridia
          - Membrifera
            - Hemimastigophora
            - Caelestes
              - Meteora sporadica
              - Solarion arienae

While Disparia is not particularly species-rich compared to other supergroups, the species included are particularly diverse. As these protists are recovered in a 'derived' position, this may indicate that there are still many disparians yet to be found, as they are obscured within the rare biosphere and environments that have not been extensively sampled.

When analyzing the complete mitochondrial genome of Solarion, researchers were surprised by the presence of mitochondrially encoded SecA, a protein that is otherwise absent in nearly all eukaryotes. In other eukaryotes, there are homologous structures in the endoplasmic reticulum and plasmids. A phylogenetic analysis focusing on SecA and homologous structures placed the SecA of Solarion within the prokaryote clade Alphaproteobacteria. This is the group from which the ancestor of eukaryotic mitochondria is derived.
