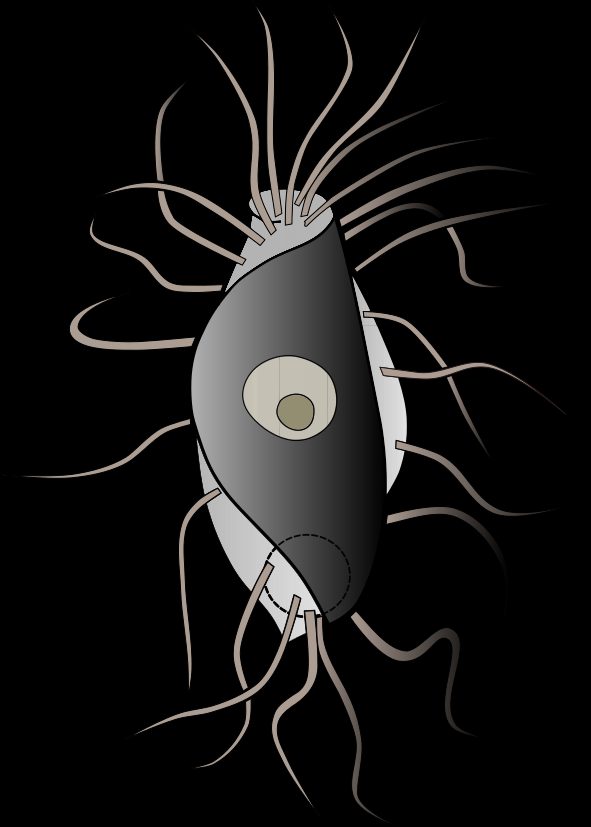
- Illustration of Hemimastix amphikineta, a hemimastigophoran

Scientific classification
- Domain: Eukaryota
- Clade: Disparia
- Clade: Membrifera; Valt & Čepička in Valt et al. 2025

Phyla
- Caelestes; Hemimastigophora

= Membrifera =

Clade of eukaryotic microbes

Membrifera is a clade of eukaryotic microbes. Alongside the Provora, it forms one of the two clades within the supergroup Disparia. The name is a Latin adjective meaning 'limb-bearing', derived from membrum, meaning 'limb', and the suffix -fer, meaning 'bearer'. This alludes to the arms, tails, and protruding stalks that characterize members of this clade.

== Taxonomy ==
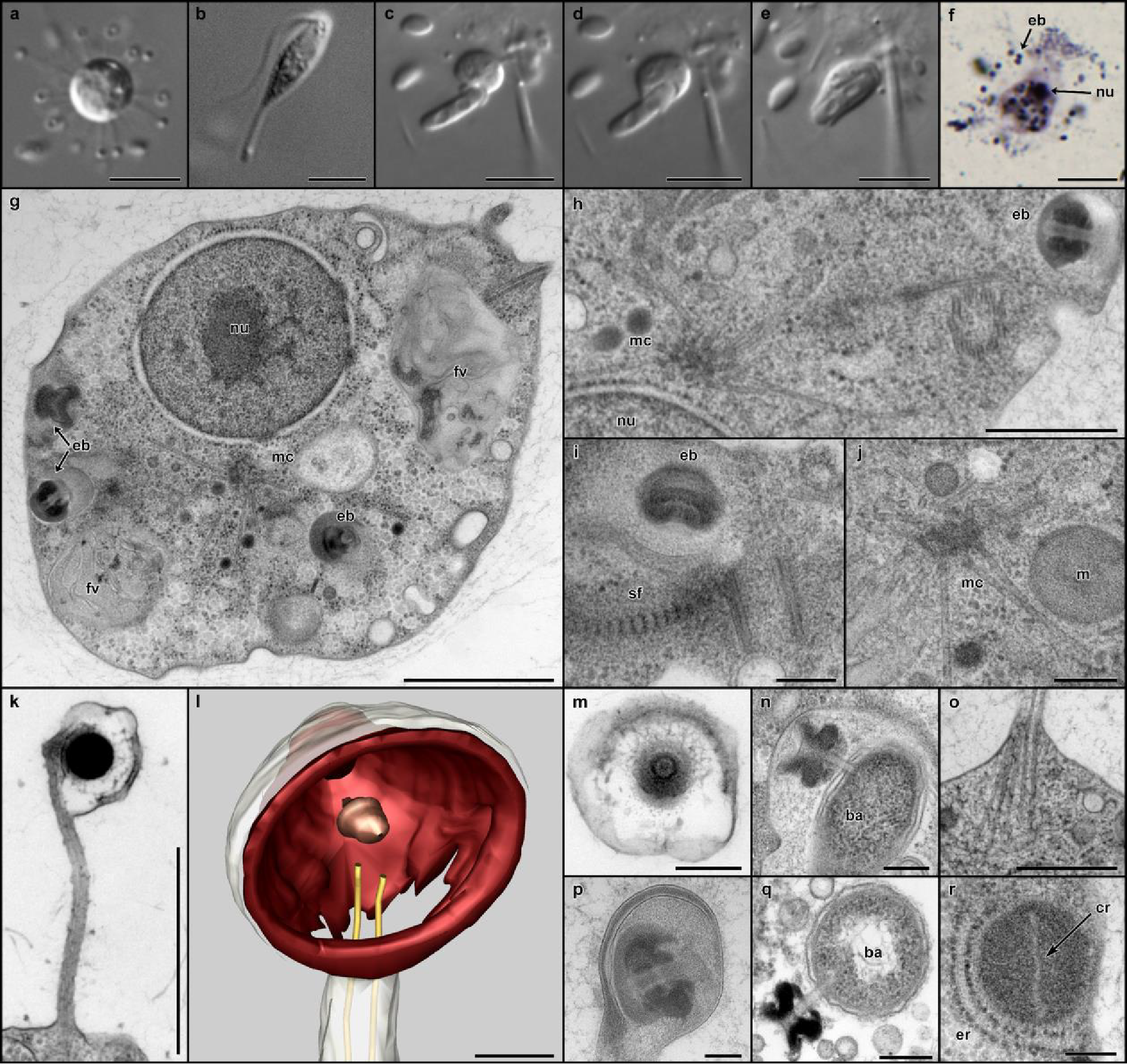
Morphology of Solarion arienae, a member of Caelestes

In their 2025 description of the membriferan Solarion arienae, Valt and colleagues used phylogenomic analyses to determine its relationships and affinities with other 'protists'. The researchers formulated a dataset comprising 87 taxa representing the known diversity of eukaryotic organisms, based on 240 protein-coding genes and 77,133 amino acid sites. The novel clade Membrifera was recovered as the sister taxon to the Provora (lit. 'devouring voracious protists')—a group described in 2022 based on the recognition of several new taxa—together comprising the broader supergroup Disparia. Membrifera contains two phyla, Hemimastigophora and Caelestes. Using an ELM+C60+G4 model, which excels in predicting sites where rapid evolution occurs, a maximum-likelihood tree was created, recreated in the cladogram below:

- Eukaryota
  - Opimoda
    ⊞
    - - Malawimonadida
      - Ancyromonadida
    - Podiata
      - CRuMs
      - - Amoebozoa
        - Obazoa
    ⊟
  - Diphoda
    - - Discoba
      - Metamonada
    - Diaphoretickes
      - - Archaeplastida
        - Pancryptista
      - - - Haptista
          - - Telonemia
            - SAR
        - Disparia
          - Provora
            - Nebulidia
            - Nibbleridia
          - Membrifera
            - Caelestes
              ⊞
              - Meteora sporadica
              - Solarion arienae
              ⊟
            - Hemimastigophora
              ⊞
              - Hemimastix kukwesjijk
              - Spironema multiciliatum
              ⊟
