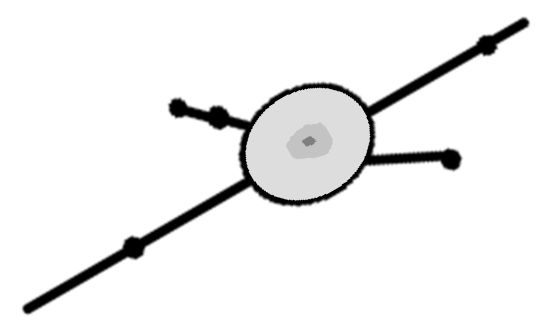
- Illustration of Meteora sporadica
- Video of the sun-like form of Solarion arienae

Scientific classification
- Domain: Eukaryota
- Clade: Disparia
- Clade: Membrifera
- Phylum: Caelestes; Valt & Čepička in Valt et al. 2025

Genera
- Meteora; Solarion

Diversity
- 2 species

= Caelestes =

Phylum of eukaryotic microbes

Caelestes is a phylum of eukaryotic microbes in the supergroup Disparia. The name is derived from the Latin word caelestis, which refers to heavenly entities. This alludes to the similarity in morphology of the two named genera in this phylum—Meteora and Solarion—to the shape of celestial bodies: a meteor and the Sun, respectively. Members of this clade are distinguished by the presence of a unique type of stalked extrusome bearing a unique structure called a celestiosome. Celestiosomes are used to pierce prey (generally bacteria) with a central filament, immobilizing it and allowing it to be drawn toward the cell.

== Taxonomy ==
In their 2025 description of the Solarion arienae, Valt and colleagues used phylogenomic analyses to determine its relationships and affinities with other 'protists'. The researchers formulated a dataset comprising 87 taxa representing the known diversity of eukaryotic organisms, based on 240 protein-coding genes and 77,133 amino acid sites. The novel clade Caelestes was recovered as the sister taxon to the Hemimastigophora. The year prior, Meteora had been discovered to have affinities with hemimastigophorans. Using an ELM+C60+G4 model, which excels in predicting sites where rapid evolution occurs, a maximum-likelihood tree was created, recreated in the cladogram below:

- Eukaryota
  - Opimoda
    ⊞
    - - Malawimonadida
      - Ancyromonadida
    - Podiata
      - CRuMs
      - - Amoebozoa
        - Obazoa
    ⊟
  - Diphoda
    - - Discoba
      - Metamonada
    - Diaphoretickes
      - - Archaeplastida
        - Pancryptista
      - - - Haptista
          - - Telonemia
            - SAR
        - Disparia
          - Provora
            - Nebulidia
            - Nibbleridia
          - Membrifera
            - Hemimastigophora
              ⊞
              - Hemimastix kukwesjijk
              - Spironema multiciliatum
              ⊟
            - Caelestes
              - Meteora sporadica
              - Solarion arienae
