= Disparia =

- Illustration of Ubysseya fretuma, a provoran

Scientific classification
- Domain: Eukaryota
- Clade: Diaphoretickes
- Clade: Disparia; Valt & Čepička in Valt et al. 2025

Subgroups
- Membrifera; Provora

Synonyms
- Promethea Zlatogursky, Boscaro & Keeling 2025

Supergroup of eukaryotic microbes

Disparia (lit. 'disparate') is a supergroup of eukaryotic microbes. It represents one of the five primary clades within Diaphoretickes, although its exact position in this group is unclear. While this clade of protists is not particularly species-rich compared to other supergroups, the species within it are particularly diverse. The clade Promethea has a definition similar to that of Disparia, and the two have an identical taxonomic composition.

The 'derived' position of these taxa may indicate that there are still many disparians yet to be found, as they are obscured within the rare biosphere and environments that have not been extensively sampled. Disparians are likely most common in surface pelagic regions, but not abyssal zones.

== Taxonomy and definitions ==
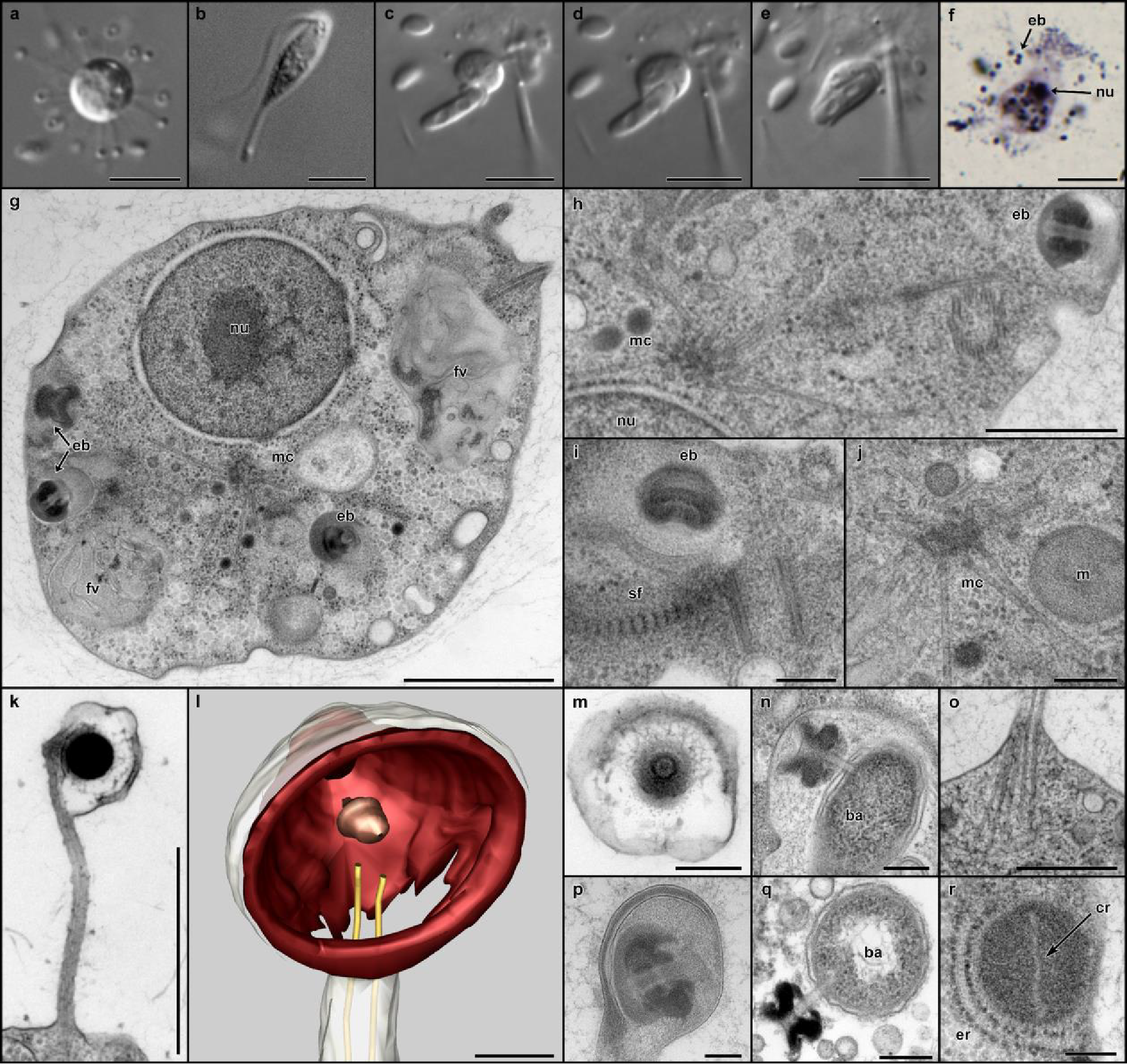
Morphology of Solarion arienae, a membriferan

In their November 2025 description of the disparian Solarion arienae, Valt and colleagues used phylogenomic analyses to determine its relationships and affinities with other 'protists'. The researchers formulated a dataset comprising 87 taxa representing the known diversity of eukaryotic organisms, based on 240 protein-coding genes and 77,133 amino acid sites. The novel supergroup Disparia comprises Provora (lit. 'devouring voracious protists')—a group described in 2022 based on the recognition of several new taxa—as the sister taxon to the new clade Membrifera (lit. 'limb-bearing'). Based on this analysis, both subclades contain two phyla, Nebulidia + Nibbleridia in the former and Hemimastigophora + Caelestes in the latter. While these relationships are well-supported, the placement of Disparia within Diaphoretickes varies based on what model or dataset is used in the analyses. Using a ELM+C60+G4 model, which excels in predicting sites where rapid evolution occurs, a maximum-likelihood tree was created, recreated in the cladogram below:

- Eukaryota
  - Opimoda
    ⊞
    - - Malawimonadida
      - Ancyromonadida
    - Podiata
      - CRuMs
      - - Amoebozoa
        - Obazoa
    ⊟
  - Diphoda
    - - Discoba
      - Metamonada
    - Diaphoretickes
      - - Archaeplastida
        - Pancryptista
      - - - Haptista
          - - Telonemia
            - SAR
        - Disparia
          - Provora
            - Nebulidia
              ⊞
              - Ancoracysta twista
              - Nebulomonas marisrubri
              ⊟
            - Nibbleridia
              ⊞
              - Ubysseya fretuma
              - - Nibbleromonas curacaus
                - Nibbleromonas quarantinus
              ⊟
          - Membrifera
            - Caelestes
              ⊞
              - Meteora sporadica
              - Solarion arienae
              ⊟
            - Hemimastigophora
              ⊞
              - Hemimastix kukwesjijk
              - Spironema multiciliatum
              ⊟

Valt and Čepička diagnosed Disparia as a branch-based clade, defined as:

Eukaryotes more closely related to Hemimastigophora, Provora, and Caelestes than to Metamonada, Discoba, Sar, Telonemia, Haptista, Pancryptista, Archaeplastida, Amoebozoa, Obazoa, CRuMs, Ancyromonadida, or Malawimonadida.

Earlier in 2025, Zlatogursky, Boscaro, and Keeling named Promethea as a novel clade encompassing provorans, meteorids, and hemimastigophorans. The name is derived from the first letters of these three lineages (PROvorans, METeorids, and HEmimastigophorans). It also alludes to the Prometheus, a titan in Greek mythology, referencing the likely antiquity of the last common ancestor of prometheans. These researchers diagnosed it as a node-based clade, defined as:

The least inclusive clade containing Ancoracysta twista, Hemimastix kukwesjijk, and Meteora sporadica, but not Telonema subtile, Paramecium aurelia, or Arabidopsis thaliana.

As Promethea is a node-based clade, it is technically subordinate to (a member of) Disparia (a branch-based clade), although the two clades have identical content.
