= Ancoracysta =

Scientific classification
- Domain: Eukaryota
- Clade: Disparia
- Clade: Provora
- Phylum: Nebulidia
- Class: Alveidea
- Order: Alveida
- Family: Ancoracystidae
- Genus: Ancoracysta; Janouškovec et al., 2017
- Species: A. twista

Binomial name
- Ancoracysta twista Janouškovec et al., 2017

Genus of eukaryotic microbes

Ancoracysta is a genus of eukaryotic microbes containing the species Ancoracysta twista, a predatory protist.

== Description ==
Ancoracysta twista was first described in November 2017 in Current Biology. It was found in a sample collected from the surface of a tropical aquarium brain coral. It actively feeds on Procryptobia sorokini, probably immobilising its prey through discharging a previously unknown type of extrusome named an ancoracyst.

Genetic analysis shows that it is not closely related to any known lineage, but it may be most closely related to a grouping of haptophytes and centrohelids (Haptista). It is notable for having a gene-rich mitochondrial genome, the largest known outside the jakobids or Diphylleia rotans. Uniquely, it appears to contain both the nucleus-encoded holocytochrome c synthase system III and the mitochondrion-encoded bacterial cytochrome c maturation system I.

== Taxonomy ==
A 2018 study from Cavalier-Smith, Chao & Lewis created a new subphylum and subsequent lower taxonomic ranks for Ancoracysta twista. They also created a new combination for Colponema marisrubri (Mylnikov & Tikhonenkov, 2009), which was shown to be ultrastructurally similar and phylogenetically close to A. twista, thus renaming it A. marisrubri. This species was later placed into a new genus, Nebulomonas, and is now called Nebulomonas marisrubri.

A 2022 study placed A. twista in a new supergroup Provora, closely related to other supergroups of Diaphoretickes such as Haptista, but no longer within Haptista.
