= Ubysseya =

Scientific classification
- Domain: Eukaryota
- Clade: Provora
- Phylum: Nibbleridia
- Class: Nibbleridea
- Order: Nibbleridida
- Family: Nibbleridae
- Genus: Ubysseya; Tikhonenkov et al., 2022
- Species: U. fretuma

Binomial name
- Ubysseya fretuma Tikhonenkov et al., 2022

Genus of eukaryotic microbes

Ubysseya is a genus of eukaryotic microbes containing the species Ubysseya fretuma, a predatory protist in the clade Provora. The species was discovered in 2022 based on specimens collected from sea water samples in the Strait of Georgia, Canada, at a depth of 220 meters.

== Taxonomy ==
The location and relationships of Ubysseya within Provora is represented by the following:

- Provora
  - Nebulidia
    - Nebulomonas
      N. marisrubri
    - Ancoracysta
      A. twista
  - Nibbleridia
    - Ubysseya
      U. fretuma
    - Nibbleromonas
      - - N. arcticus
        - N. piranha
      - N. kosolapovi
      - - N. curacaus
        - N. quarantinus
