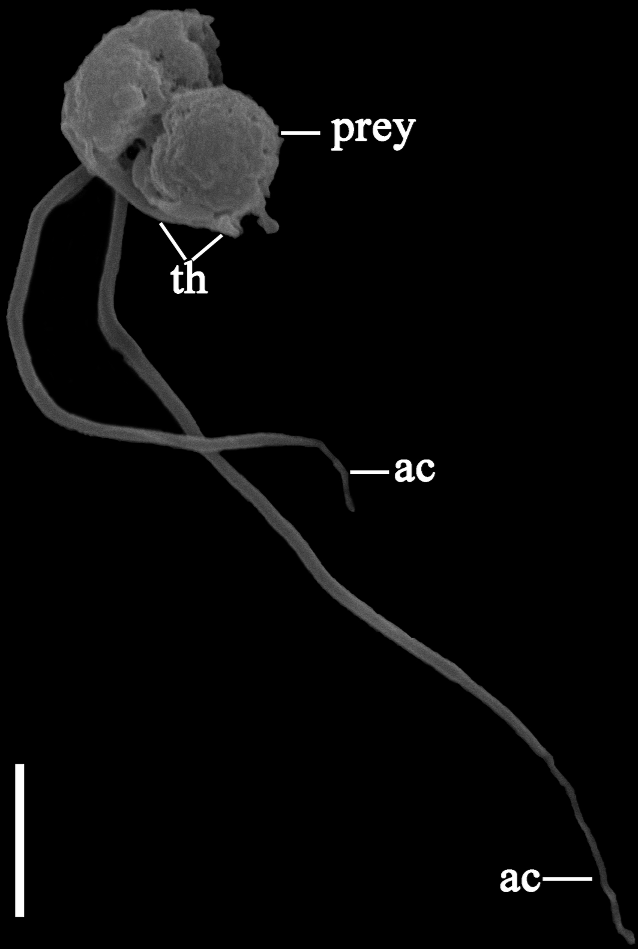
- Scanning electron microscopy image of Nibbleromonas kosolapovi, a nibblerid predator, biting on its prey, Procryptobia sorokini. Abbreviations: th, thorn; ac, acronemes. Scale bar: 2 µm.

Scientific classification
- Domain: Eukaryota
- Supergroup: Disparia
- Clade: Provora; Tikhonenkov et al. 2022

Phyla
- Nebulidia; Nibbleridia

Diversity
- 8 species

= Provora =

Group of predatory microbes

Provora is a supergroup of eukaryotes made up of predatory microbes, whose name implies something such as "protists devouring voraciously". It was reported that ten strains were isolated and cultured in 2022. They are predators of other microorganisms. Their discovery was very delayed, compared to other microorganisms in their environments, due to their rarity. Their 18S ribosomal RNA is very different from that of other eukaryotes consistent with their being a lineage without known close relatives; this was confirmed by phylogenomic analyses of datasets of several hundred proteins, so they were taxonomically placed in a separate supergroup.

== Description ==
Superficially, provorans are small, unassuming single-celled flagellates with two flagella. They have a complex cell envelope, and use extrusomes (harpoon-like structures) and a ventral groove to attack and feed on their prey. Each flagellum is inserted into a separate flagellar pocket. The distinguishing characteristic is their unique behavior: they are particularly fast swimmers that feed exclusively on other single-celled protists. One group, the nebulids, swallow prey cells whole; the other, the nibblerids, 'nibble' on their prey using a jaw-like feeding apparatus.

== Evolution ==
=== External relationships ===
The supergroup Provora is composed of microbes that form an ancient lineage of eukaryotes. The initial phylogenetic analyses recovered a position within the larger supergroup Diaphoretickes, particularly as sister to the protist groups TSAR and Haptista. However, a 2024 phylogenomic analysis recovered Provora as part of a novel lineage of eukaryotes, specifically as the sister group to a clade containing Hemimastigophora and the species Meteora sporadica. Either position is reflected in the biology of Provora: their extrusomes are similar to those found in Hemimastigophora, while other cellular features most closely resemble those found in TSAR and Haptista, such as flagellar vanes, the architecture of the flagellar apparatus, and the presence of cortical alveoli below the cell membrane. The following cladogram represents the two alternative evolutionary positions:

- Eukaryotes
  - - Diaphoretickes
      - - - TSAR
            - SAR
            - Telonemia
          - Haptista
        - Provora
      - - Cryptista
        - Archaeplastida
    - Discoba
  - - Provora
    - - Hemimastigophora
      - Meteora sporadica
  - Metamonada
  - Ancyromonadida
  - Malawimonadida
  - - Amorphea
      - Amoebozoa
      - Obazoa
    - CRuMs

=== Internal relationships ===
The phylogenetic relationships between the eight described species of Provora is the following:

- Provora
  - Nebulidia
    - Nebulomonas
      N. marisrubri
    - Ancoracysta
      A. twista
  - Nibbleridia
    - Ubysseya
      U. fretuma
    - Nibbleromonas
      - - N. arcticus
        - N. piranha
      - N. kosolapovi
      - - N. curacaus
        - N. quarantinus
