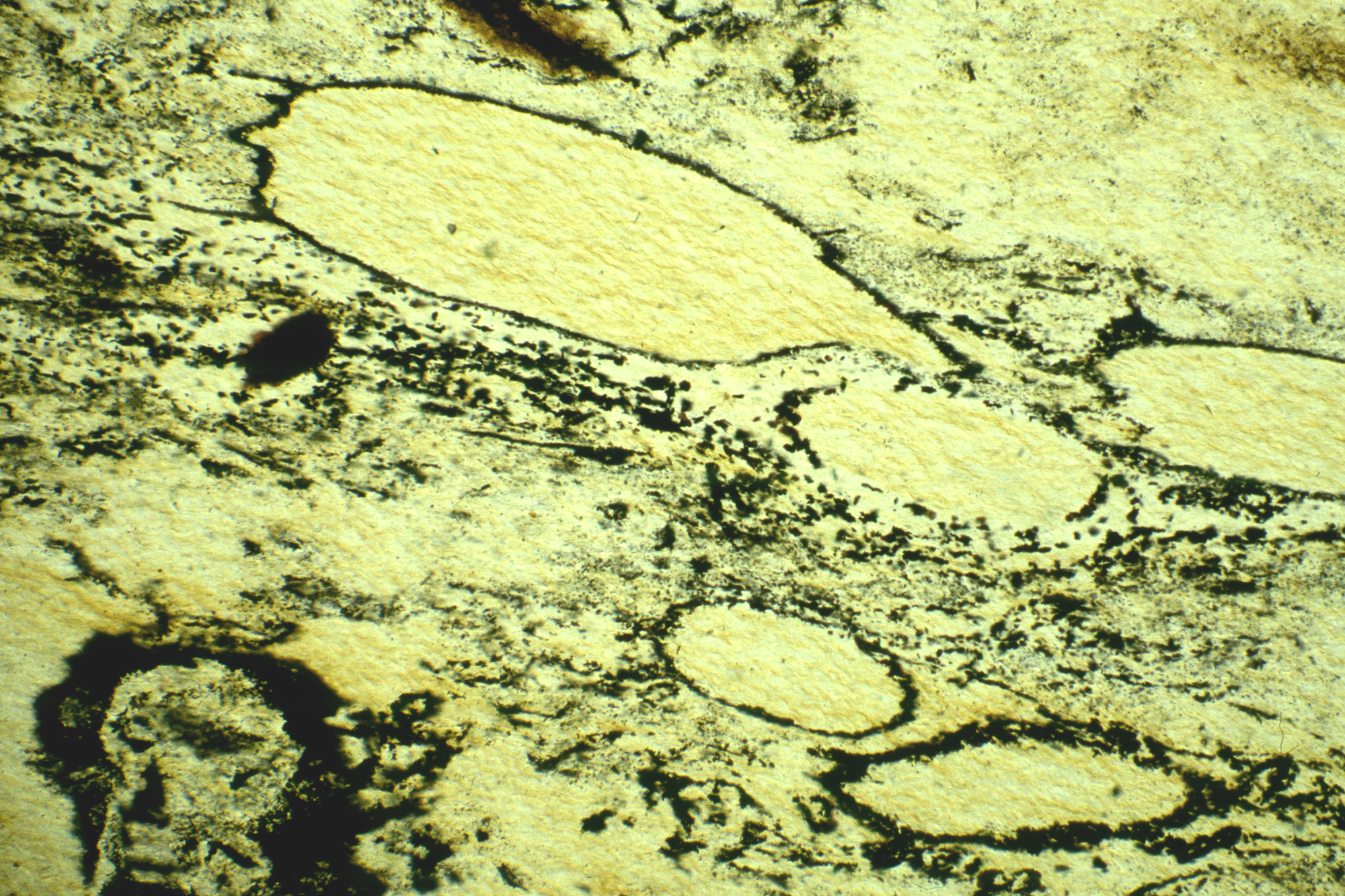
- Diskagma buttonii holotype, in thin section of 2.2 billion year old Waterval Onder paleosol, South Africa

Scientific classification
- Domain: Eukaryota
- (unranked): incertae sedis
- Genus: †Diskagma; Retallack (2013)
- Species: †D. buttonii

Binomial name
- †Diskagma buttonii Retallack (2013)

= Diskagma =

Diskagma Temporal range: Paleoproterozoic, 2200 Ma

Genus of problematic fossil

Diskagma ("disc-like fragment") is a genus of problematic fossil from a Paleoproterozoic (2.2 billion years old) paleosol from South Africa, and significant as one of the oldest likely eukaryotes and some of the earliest evidence for life on land.

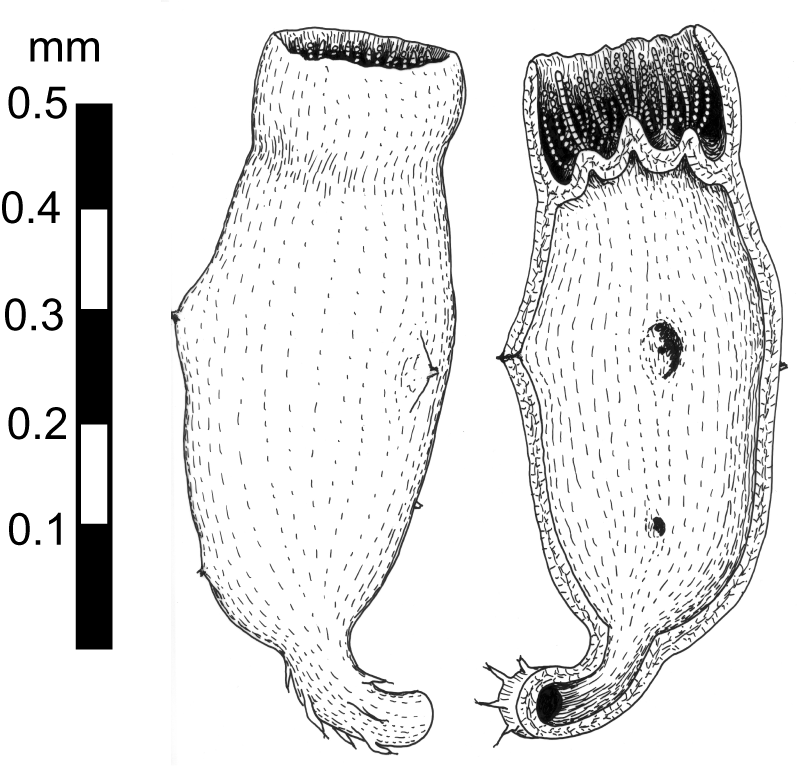
Reconstruction of Diskagma buttonii.

== Description ==
Diskagma buttonii is a small fossil less than 1mm in length found within the surface horizon of a vertisol paleosol above the Hekpoort Basalt dated to 2.2 billion years old. The opacity of the matrix and the size of the fossil meant that its three dimensional structure required imaging by computer-assisted x-ray tomography using a cyclotron source. The fossils are shaped like an urn with an apical cup, which is filled with filamentous structures whose exact nature is uncertain due to recrystallization of the matrix under greenschist facies metamorphism. The base of these hollow urns is a system of hollow tubes running over the paleosol and connecting the urns into groups. The walls of Diskagma have scattered spiny or tubular extensions.

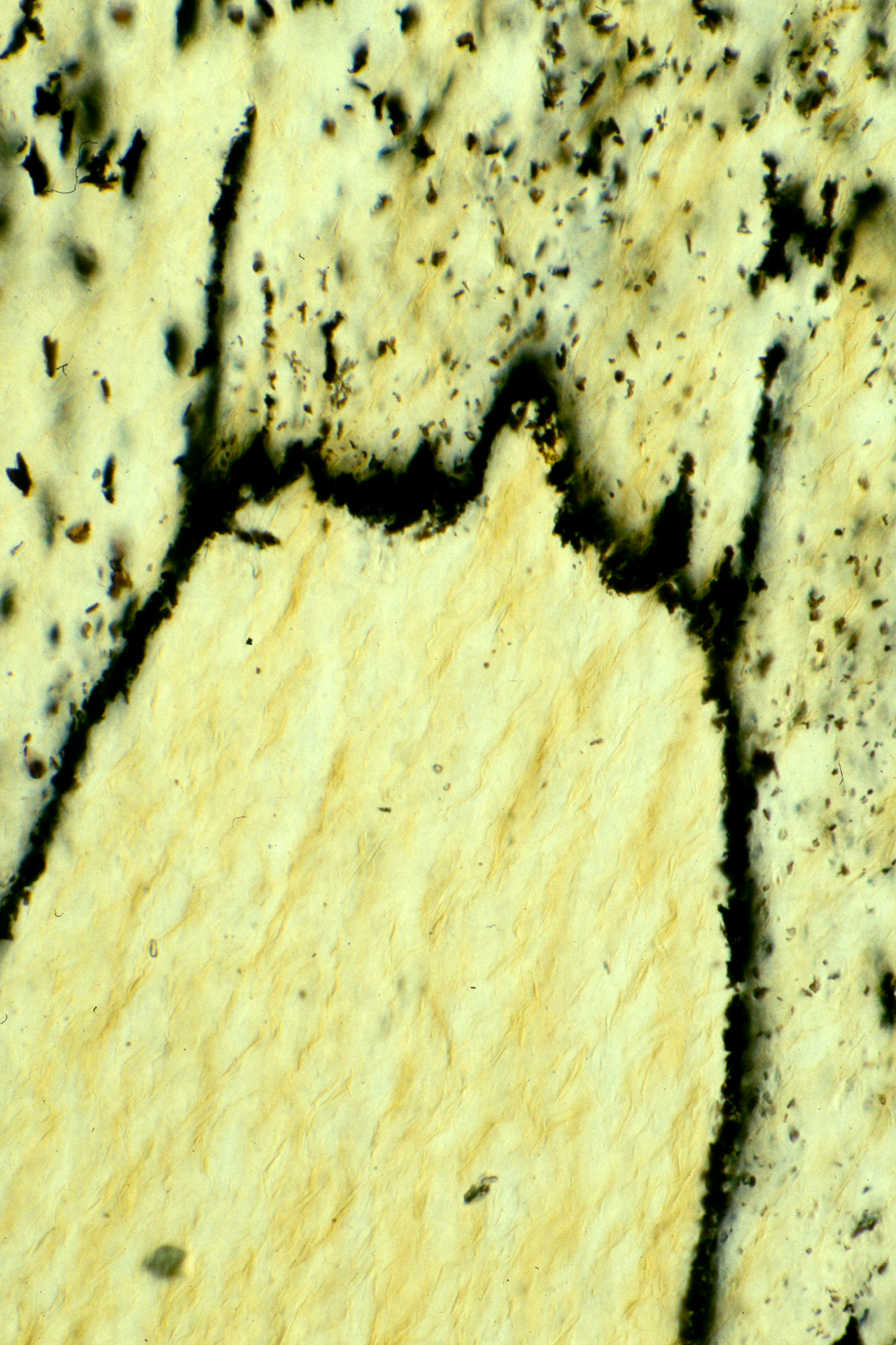
Poorly preserved filamentous structures in the apex of Diskagma buttonii

== Biological affinities ==
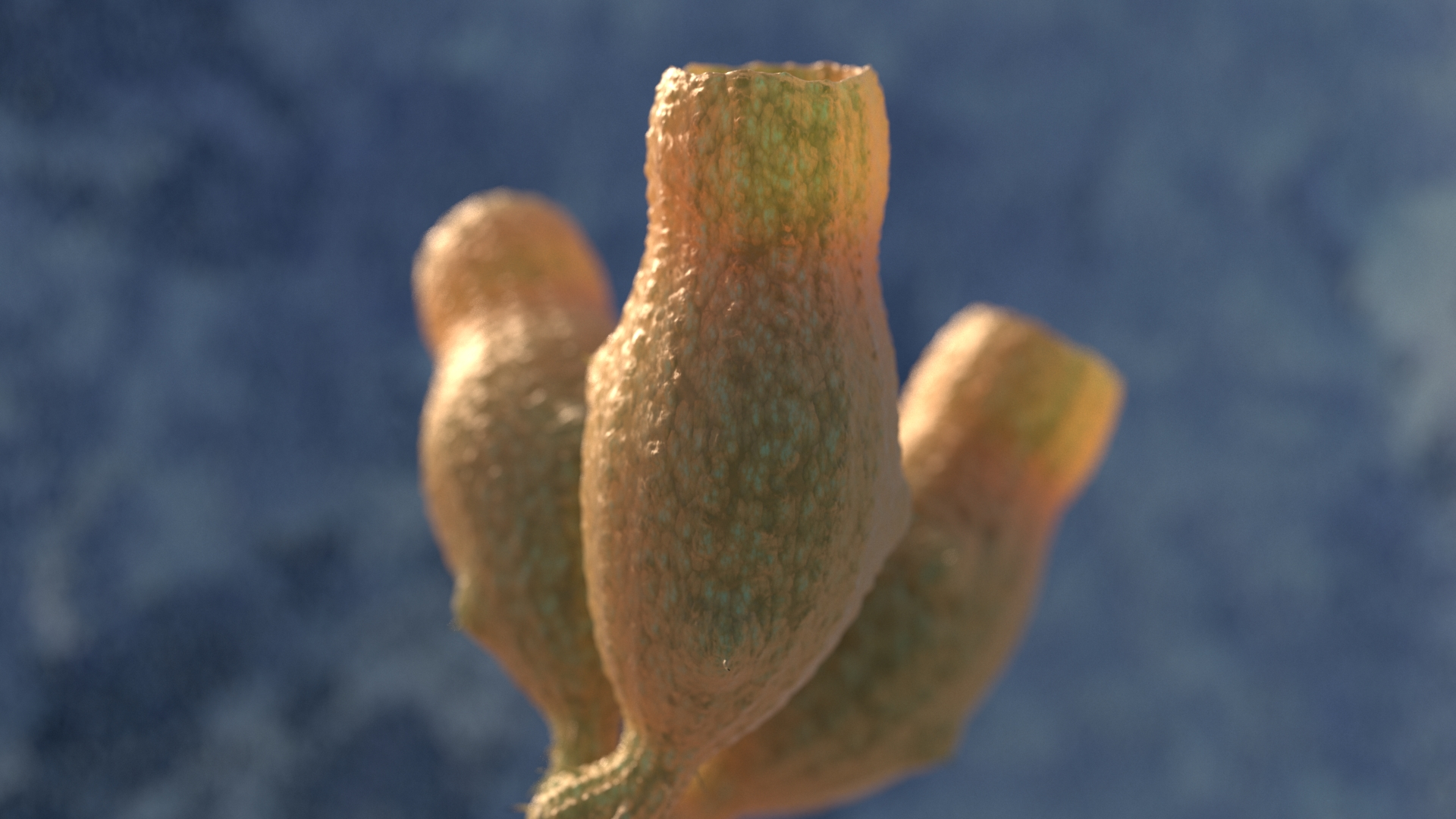
3D reconstruction of Diskagma buttonii

Diskagma buttonii is a problematic fossil that has been named before its biological affinities have been understood. Its size and complexity suggest that it had the degree of cytoskeletal complexity found in eukaryotes, but it predates the other fossil candidate for the oldest eukaryote Grypania, now known to be 1.8 billion years old, and at 2.2 billion years old is much older than molecular clock estimates for eukaryotes of 1.6 billion years. Another similar fossil is Horodyskia. The size and hollow shape of Diskagma are similar to the living fungus Geosiphon, which is endosymbiotic with the cyanobacterium Nostoc. However, the apical cup and filaments are not seen in modern Geosiphon.

== Paleoenvironmental significance ==
Diskagma buttonii dates to the Paleoproterozoic Great Oxygenation Event, a time of marked increase in atmospheric oxygenation compared with that of the Archean. If, like the living Geosiphon, the central cavity of Diskagma housed a photosymbiont, it may have contributed to atmospheric oxygenation.

Although Precambrian landscapes are customarily regarded as barren as the surface of Mars, Diskagma is evidence for very early life on land. Furthermore, at 2.2 billion years old, Diskagma was larger than coeval marine microbes of the Gunflint Chert, and more complex than stromatolites.
