= Nibblerid =

- Drawing of Ubysseya fretuma

Scientific classification
- Domain: Eukaryota
- Clade: Disparia
- Clade: Provora
- Phylum: Nibbleridia; Tikhonenkov et al. 2022
- Class: Nibbleridea; Tikhonenkov et al. 2022
- Order: Nibbleridida; Tikhonenkov et al. 2022
- Family: Nibbleridae; Tikhonenkov et al. 2022

Type genus
- Nibbleromonas Tikhonenkov et al. 2022

Genera
- Ubysseya; Nibbleromonas

Phylum of microbes in Provora

Nibbleridia is a phylum of predatory microbial eukaryotes in the supergroup Provora. Known as nibblerids, the group contains the class Nibbleridea, order Nibbleridida, family Nibbleridae, and genera Ubysseya and Nibbleromonas.

== Taxonomy ==
The phylogenetic relationships between the six described species of Nibbleridia are represented by the following:

- Nibbleridia
  - - Ubysseya
      U. fretuma
    - Nibbleromonas
      - - N. arcticus
        - N. piranha
      - N. kosolapovi
      - - N. curacaus
        - N. quarantinus
