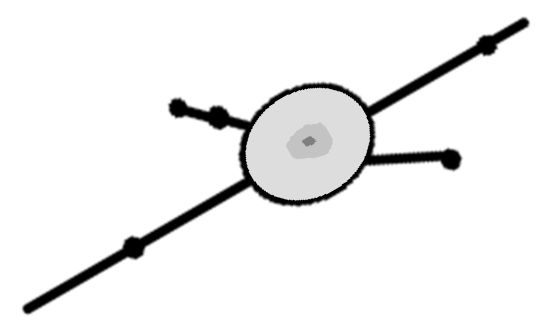
- Drawing of a Meteora sporadica individual

Scientific classification
- Domain: Eukaryota
- Supergroup: Disparia
- Phylum: Caelestes
- Genus: Meteora; Hausmann, Weitere, Wolf & Arndt 2002
- Species: M. sporadica

Binomial name
- Meteora sporadica Hausmann, Weitere, Wolf & Arndt 2002

= Meteora sporadica =

Species of deep sea protist

Meteora sporadica is a free-living species of protozoan discovered in 2002 during sampling at a depth of 1,230 meters below sea level in the Sporades Basin, part of the Mediterranean Sea. It is the only named species of the genus Meteora.

It was placed as Protista incertae sedis due to its unique morphology unlike any other group of protists. Two decades later, a 2022 phylogenetic analysis of Meteora still was not able to solidly relate it to any known group of eukaryotes, suggesting that it could be a new high-level eukaryotic group. In 2024 it was revealed to be related to Hemimastigophora. This was clarified in the 2025 description of Solarion arienae, which placed Meteora and Solarion as sister taxa within a new clade Caelestes, in turn sister to hemimastigophorans.

Cells of M. sporadica are small and highly flexible, bearing multiple elongate extensions used in locomotion and prey capture. The organism is considered a benthic bacterivore and has since been recovered from several shallow-water and intertidal environments, indicating a wider ecological distribution than originally assumed.

== Morphology ==
Cells of Meteora sporadica are small, typically 4–5 μm in length and 3–4 μm in width, with a flexible, bilaterally symmetrical body. The organism possesses a long anterior–posterior axis and usually two lateral arm-like extensions, although additional arms or short protrusions may appear in some individuals. These lateral arms move independently in a sweeping or rowing motion and are involved in prey capture.

The cell surface contains numerous ovoid extrusomes (~240 × 180 nm) distributed along the long axis and arms. These extrusomes attach to bacterial prey and are commonly observed discharged inside food vacuoles. Transmission electron microscopy shows that the long axis and arms are supported by bundles of microtubules originating from a cluster of subnuclear microtubule-organizing centers (MTOCs), and the cell lacks any flagella or axoneme-like structures. The mitochondrion is branched, positioned dorsally to the nucleus, and contains flat cristae. Cell division occurs along the longitudinal axis, producing two daughter cells that rapidly regenerate their missing ends after cytokinesis.

== Ecology ==
Meteora sporadica has been reported from a variety of benthic environments. The original 2002 specimen was isolated from deep-sea sediments at a depth of 1,230 m in the Sporades Basin of the Mediterranean Sea. Later studies cultured additional isolates from shallow coastal sediments (0–1 m) near Syros Island, Greece, and from intertidal sediments along the Labrador Coast, Canada, demonstrating that the species is not restricted to deep-sea habitats.

Observations of living cells show that M. sporadica moves by gliding along sediment surfaces and captures bacteria using its lateral arm-like appendages. Extrusomes are frequently found attached to ingested bacterial cells inside food vacuoles, indicating a bacterivorous lifestyle. These findings suggest that Meteora occupies a niche as a small benthic microbial predator within marine sediment communities.

== Behavior ==
Meteora sporadica exhibits a distinctive gliding form of locomotion. The cell moves along its elongated longitudinal axis while the lateral arms swing in a regular back-and-forth pattern. Gliding continues even when the arms are immobile or absent, indicating that arm movement is not required for motility.

The organism often produces rapid protrusions from its arms or long axis, forming temporary extensions up to 3 μm in length. During feeding, Meteora captures bacterial prey using extrusomes located mostly on the arms; the attached prey is transported toward the cell body and phagocytosed.

Cell division occurs across the longitudinal axis. The cell pauses movement while the body shifts slightly before cytokinesis begins; daughter cells subsequently regenerate the missing ends of the long axis within approximately five minutes.
