= Nebulid =

Scientific classification
- Domain: Eukaryota
- Clade: Disparia
- Clade: Provora
- Phylum: Nebulidia; Tikhonenkov et al. 2022
- Class: Alveidea; Cavalier-Smith in Cavalier-Smith, Chao & Lewis 2018
- Order: Alveida; Cavalier-Smith in Cavalier-Smith, Chao & Lewis 2018
- Family: Ancoracystidae; Cavalier-Smith in Cavalier-Smith, Chao & Lewis 2018

Type genus
- Ancoracysta Janouškovec et al. 2017

Genera
- Nebulomonas; Ancoracysta

Synonyms
- Alveidea: Nebulidea Tikhonenkov et al. 2022; Alveida: Nebulidida Tikhonenkov et al. 2022; Ancoracystidae: "Nebulidae" Tikhonenkov et al. 2022

Phylum of microbes in Provora

Nebulidia is a phylum of predatory microbial eukaryotes in the supergroup Provora. Known as nebulids, the group contains the class Alveidea, order Alveida, family Ancoracystidae, and genera Nebulomonas and Ancoracysta.
