= Rare biosphere =

Rare species of bacteria

Rare biosphere refers to a large number of rare species of microbial life, i.e. bacteria, archaea and fungi, that can be found in very low concentrations in an environment.

== Microbial ecosystems ==
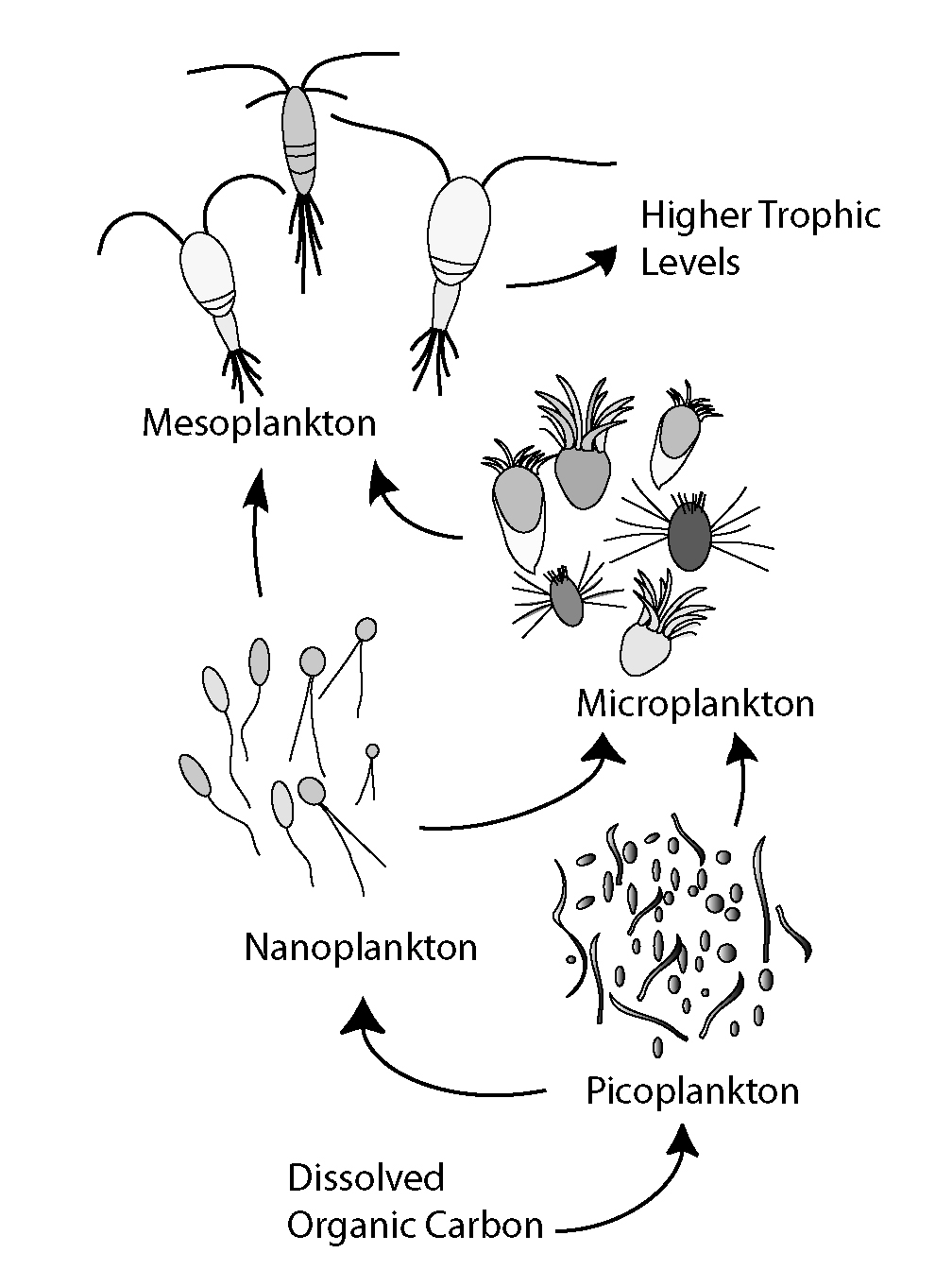
Schematic of the microbial loop.

Changes in the biodiversity of an ecosystem, whether marine or terrestrial, may affect its efficiency and function. Climate change or other anthropogenic perturbations can decrease productivity and disrupt global biogeochemical cycles. The possible ramifications of such changes are not well characterized or understood, and up to a point redundancy in an ecosystem may protect it from disruption.

The dynamics of microbial ecosystems are tightly coupled to biogeochemical processes. For example, in the marine microbial loop, bacteria decompose organics and recycle nutrients such as nitrogen for other organisms such as phytoplankton to use. A reduction in recycled nitrogen would limit the production rate of phytoplankton, in turn limiting the growth of grazers, with effects throughout the food web and nitrogen cycle. To gauge such effects, a base line of microbial diversity is needed. The species of rare biosphere can offer the gene pool that can be activated under changing conditions, thus keeping the ecosystem functional. Members of the rare biosphere have been recognised as important drivers of many key ecosystem functions, for example providing bioavailable nitrogen in marine and soil environment.

== Detection methods ==
Previous attempts to characterize in situ abundance of different microbial species in specific environment have been made through culturing and molecular biology techniques. Culturing produces a very narrow picture of some of the rarer species present, especially when studying an environment where only less than 0,1% of all microbes are cultivable with standard methods. Molecular biology techniques, such as Sanger sequencing, results in a much broader scope but highlights the more abundant species present. Neither of these techniques capture all of the diversity present. The current state of the art practice is the use of high-throughput sequencing techniques, pioneered by Dr. Mitchell Sogin of the Marine Biological Laboratory. This method has broadened the scope of biodiversity, with the discovery of the rare biosphere. High throughput sequencing, or "tag sequencing", divides unique rRNA gene (or other target gene) tag sequences into operational taxonomic units (OTUs) based upon similarities in the DNA code of the sequenced gene region. Both Sanger, shotgun sequencing, and tag sequencing organize sequences into OTUs. However, it is the resolution that tag sequencing provides that sets it apart from other methods, resulting from the increased efficiency in serial analysis. This efficiency increase is made possible through the use of internal primer sequences resulting in restriction digest overhanging sequences. Though OTUs provide a means of distinguishing the possible number of phylogenetic groups, it is not possible to deduce phylogenetic relationships based upon OTU's. Tags associated with OTUs must be cross-referenced with gene banks, in order for tags to be phylotyped and relationships established.

The result of tag sequencing has been to produce orders of magnitude larger estimates of OTUs present in ecosystems, producing a long tail on species abundance curves. This long tail accounts for less than 0.1% of the abundant species in a particular ecosystem. At the same time it represents thousands of populations accounting for most of the phylogenetic diversity in an ecosystem. This low-abundance high-diversity group is the rare biosphere. Using this method, Sogin et al.'s study of microbial diversity in North Atlantic deep water produced an estimate of 5266 different taxa. This is particularly dramatic considering that previous studies employing more traditional PCR cloning techniques have resulted in estimates of up to 500.

== Ecological role ==
Considering their low abundance, members of the rare biosphere may represent ancient and persistent taxa. As these less abundant species are limited in number, viral infection and ultimately death by lysis is more unlikely as the viruses depend on high concentrations of host organisms to persist. Additionally, being less abundant implies limited growth, and being on the smaller end of the cell size spectrum. This limits the likelihood of death by ingestion, as grazers prefer larger or more active microbes.

Just because these taxa are "rare" now does not mean that under previous conditions in our planet's history they were "rare". These taxa could have been episodically abundant, resulting in either global changes in biogeochemical cycles or a small change of the conditions in their current environment. Given the persistence of these taxa under the right conditions they have the potential to dominate, and become the more abundant taxa. Such conditions may occur on many temporal scales. It may be possible that some rare taxa dominate only during anomalous years, such as during El Niño. Change in abundance may occur on a seasonal scale.

Global climate change may provide some of these rare taxa with the conditions necessary to increase in abundance. Even in their low abundance, taxa belonging to the rare biosphere may be affecting global biogeochemical cycles. For example, recent evidence implicates that a rare minority may be responsible for fixing more cumulative nitrogen than the abundant majority of microbial cells in marine environment.

A subtle and less direct manner the rare biosphere may be affecting ecosystems, in terms of biodiversity and biogeochemical cycles, is by acting as a nearly unlimited source of genetic diversity and material. Currently, a lot of discussion and investigations are ongoing on how microbial communities present resilience after environmental perturbation or catastrophe and how closely related species may present unique and novel genetic attributes compared to near relatives. The rare biosphere could be seen as a seed bank, transferring genes resulting in fitter recombinants that rise to become the dominant majority.

== Biogeography and distribution ==
The rare biosphere has been studied in numerous different environments, including seas, lakes, soils and even deep bedrock. There is some debate concerning the distribution of taxa within the rare biosphere. Taxa within this group at a given site may be in the process of dispersal. Studies in the Arctic seabed identified thermophilic bacteria, arriving through mechanisms of dispersal, that could not be metabolically active. Once these populations, such as the thermophilic bacteria in the Arctic, reach a suitable niche they will again become metabolically active and increase in abundance. This requires that one view these populations as non-discrete, not endemic to any one particular body of water.

Alternatively, studies suggest that given the biogeography of rare taxa the idea of the rare biosphere being the product of dispersal seems unlikely. A study in the Arctic Ocean on the biogeography of the rare biosphere found that between parcels of water within that ocean, the rare biosphere presented a large amount of diversity. This suggests that populations within the rare biosphere experience evolutionary forces specific to the location they are found, such as selection, speciation, and extinction. Also, given the fact that many rare taxa cannot be identified in gene repositories, it seems unlikely that they abundant elsewhere.

== See also ==
- Deep biosphere
