= Supergroup (biology) =

Informal classification rank for living beings

In systematics, a supergroup or super-group is a large group of organisms that share one common ancestor and have important defining characteristics. It is an informal, mostly arbitrary rank in biological taxonomy that is often greater than phylum or kingdom, although some supergroups are also treated as phyla.

== Eukaryotic supergroups ==
Since the decade of the 2000s, the eukaryotic tree of life (abbreviated as eToL) has been divided into 5–8 major groupings called 'supergroups'. These groupings were established after the idea that only monophyletic groups should be accepted as ranks, as an alternative to the use of paraphyletic kingdom Protista. In the early days of the eToL six traditional supergroups were considered: Amoebozoa, Opisthokonta, "Excavata", Archaeplastida, "Chromalveolata" and Rhizaria. Since then, the eToL has been rearranged profoundly, and most of these groups were found as paraphyletic or lacked defining morphological characteristics that unite their members, which makes the 'supergroup' label more arbitrary.

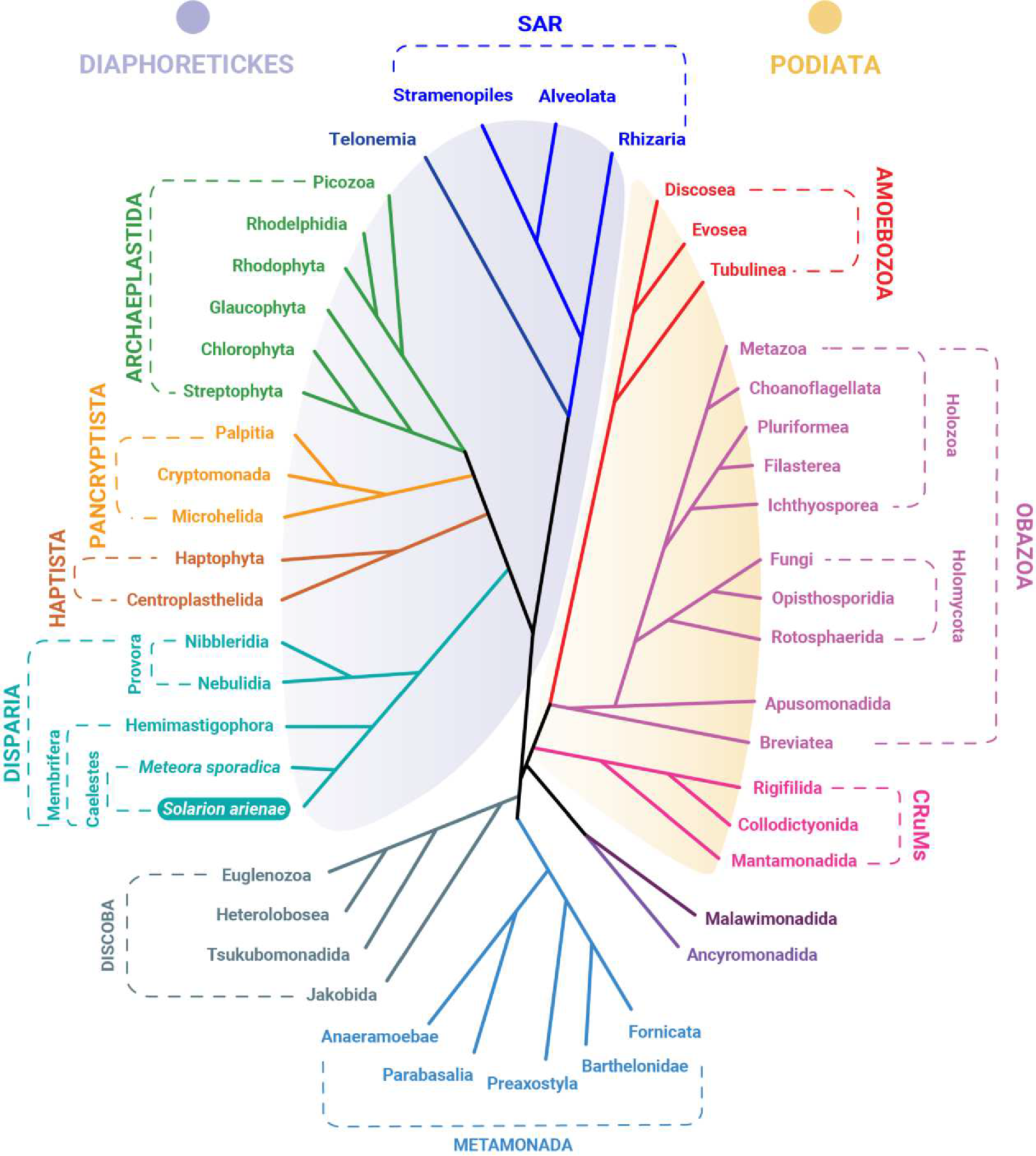
Phylogenomic tree of eukaryotes, as regarded in 2025.

Currently, the addition of many lineages of newly discovered protists (such as Telonemia, Picozoa, Hemimastigophora, Rigifilida...) and the use of phylogenomic analyses have brought a new, more accurate supergroup model. These are the current supergroups of eukaryotes:

- TSAR, constituted by Telonemia and the SAR clade (Stramenopiles, Alveolata and Rhizaria). It is estimated to occupy up to half of all eukaryotic diversity, since it includes multiple major groups such as diatoms, dinoflagellates, seaweeds, ciliates, foraminiferans, radiolarians, and the apicomplexan and oomycete parasites. It essentially contains the majority of "Chromalveolata".
- Haptista (ranked as a phylum), previously in "Chromalveolata", comprising the haptophyte algae and centrohelids.
- Cryptista (ranked as a phylum), previously in "Chromalveolata", comprising the cryptomonads, katablepharids and the enigmatic Palpitomonas.
- Archaeplastida (also treated as a kingdom), constituted by the lineages that acquired chloroplasts through primary endosymbiosis: Chloroplastida (green algae and land plants), Rhodophyta, Glaucophyta and Rhodelphis.
- Amorphea, composed by the Amoebozoa and the Opisthokonta (animals, fungi and related protists). They're related to the breviates and the apusomonads, and together form the clade Obazoa.
- CRuMs, composed by the free-living protozoan groups Collodictyonidae, Rigifilida and Mantamonas.
- Discoba, constituted by Discicristata (Euglenozoa and Heterolobosea), Jakobida and Tsukubamonas. It is the biggest remaining clade of the "Excavata".
- Metamonada, (ranked as a phylum) previously part of the "Excavates", entirely containing anaerobic protists.
- Disparia, the most recently described supergroup, containing the clades Provora, Hemimastigophora, and Caelestes.

Many orphan groups of free-living protozoa remain left behind, unable to be added to a supergroup, such as: Picozoa (possibly belongs to Archaeplastida with limited certainty), Malawimonadida (thought to be related to Metamonada), Ancyromonadida, Breviatea, Apusomonadida, etc.

A possible modern topology of the eToL would be the following (supergroups labeled in bold):

- Eukaryota
  - - - Diaphoretickes
        - - - - **TSAR**
              - **Haptista**
            - **Provora**
          - **Hemimastigophora**
        - - **Cryptista**
          - **Archaeplastida**
      - **Discoba**
    - **Metamonada**
  - - Ancyromonadida
    - - Malawimonadida
      - - **CRuMs**
        - **Amorphea**

== Prokaryotic supergroups ==
The term 'supergroup' is used in phylogenetic studies of bacteria, in a smaller sense than within eukaryotes. As of 2021, it is very commonly used for naming clades within the genus Wolbachia.
