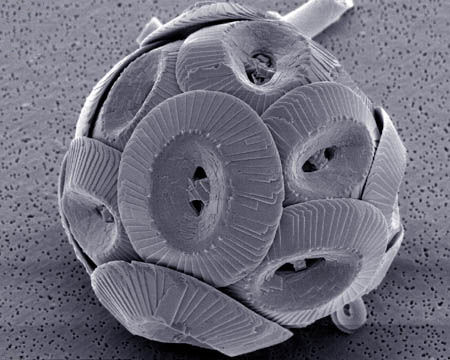

Scientific classification
- Domain: Eukaryota
- Clade: Diaphoretickes
- Supergroup: Haptista; Cavalier-Smith 2015

Subgroups
- Haptophyta; Centroplasthelida; Telonemia?

= Haptista =

Group of protists

Haptista is a group of protists made up of centrohelids and haptophytes. Phylogenomic studies indicate that Haptista is likely closely related to the TSAR supergroup. It is thus one of the earliest diverging Diaphoretickes.

Jamy et al. discovered the "leptophytes", a potential sister group to haptophytes detected through environmental DNA of plastids.

The phylum Telonemia may also be included in this group, though it is traditionally excluded and grouped with SAR instead to form TSAR.
