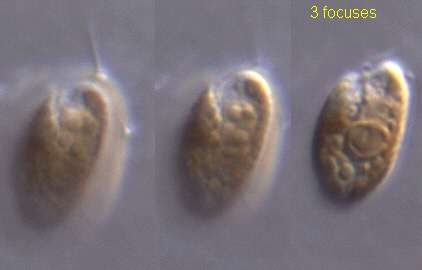
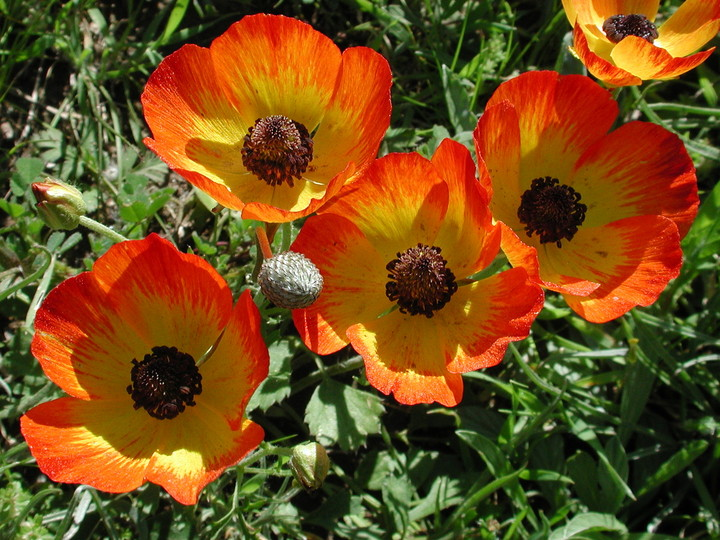
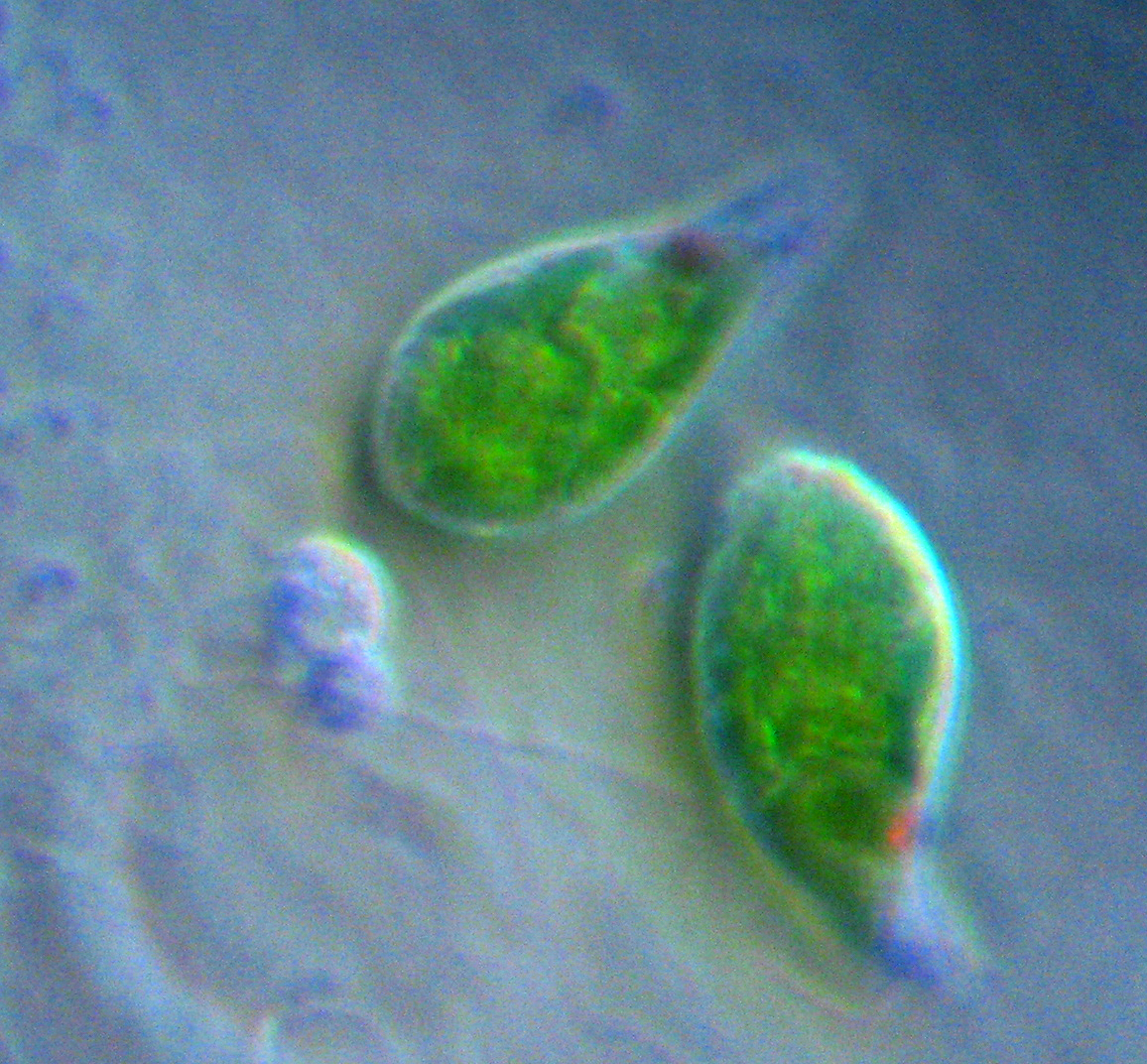
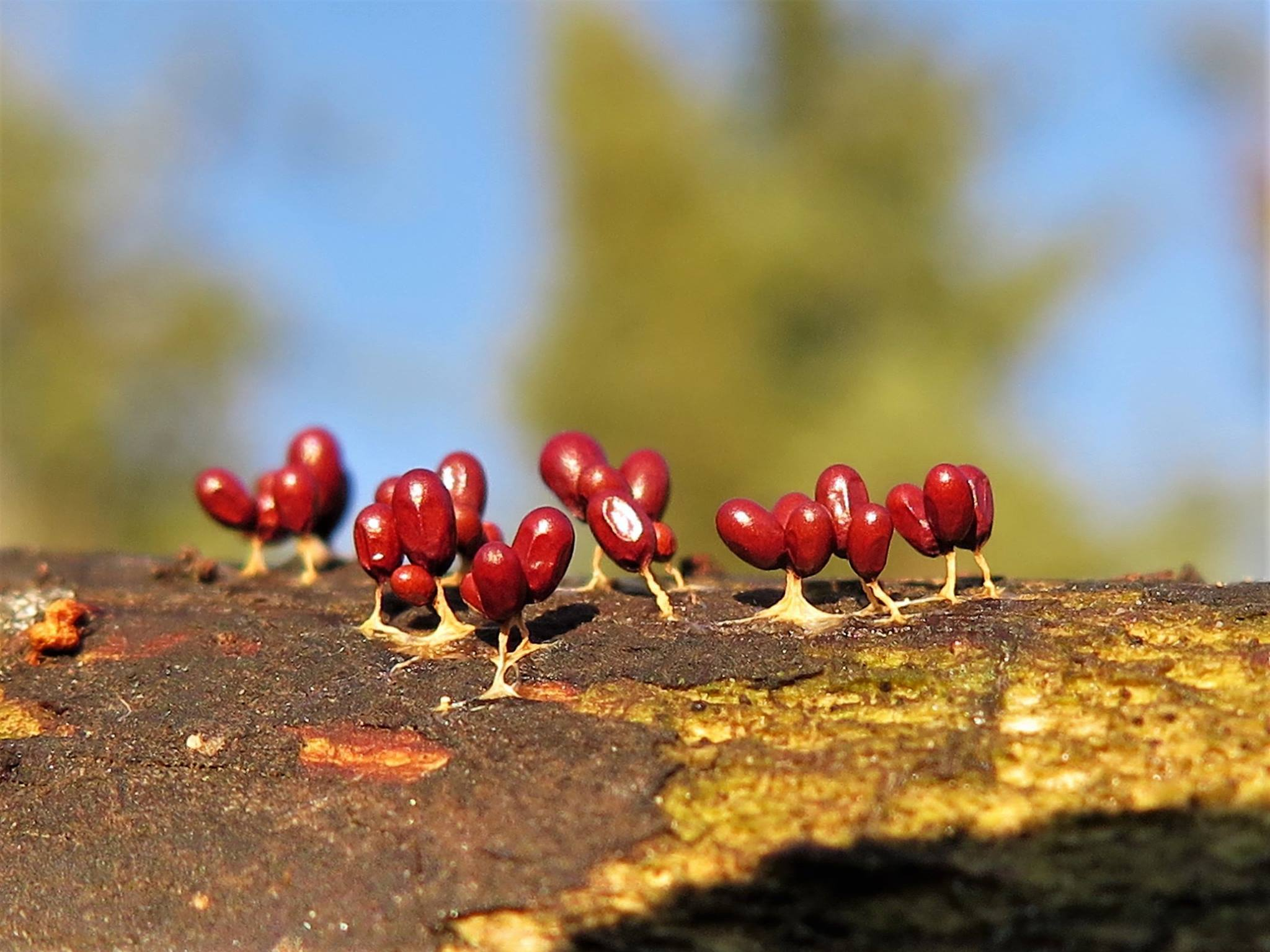
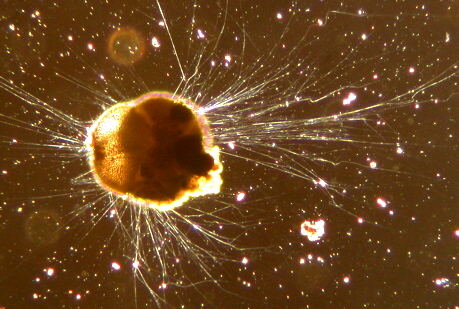
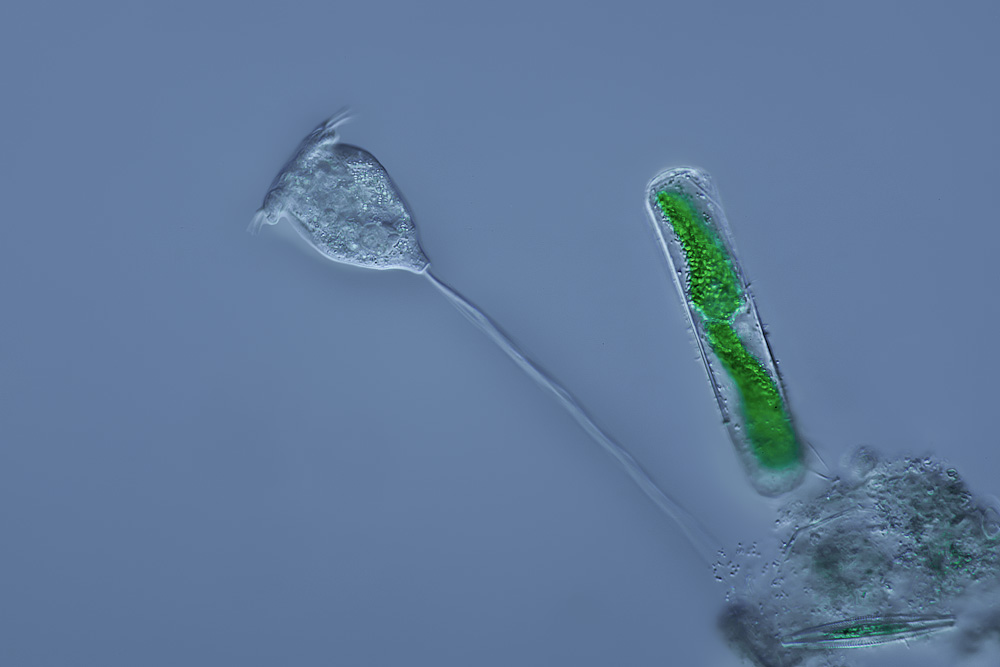
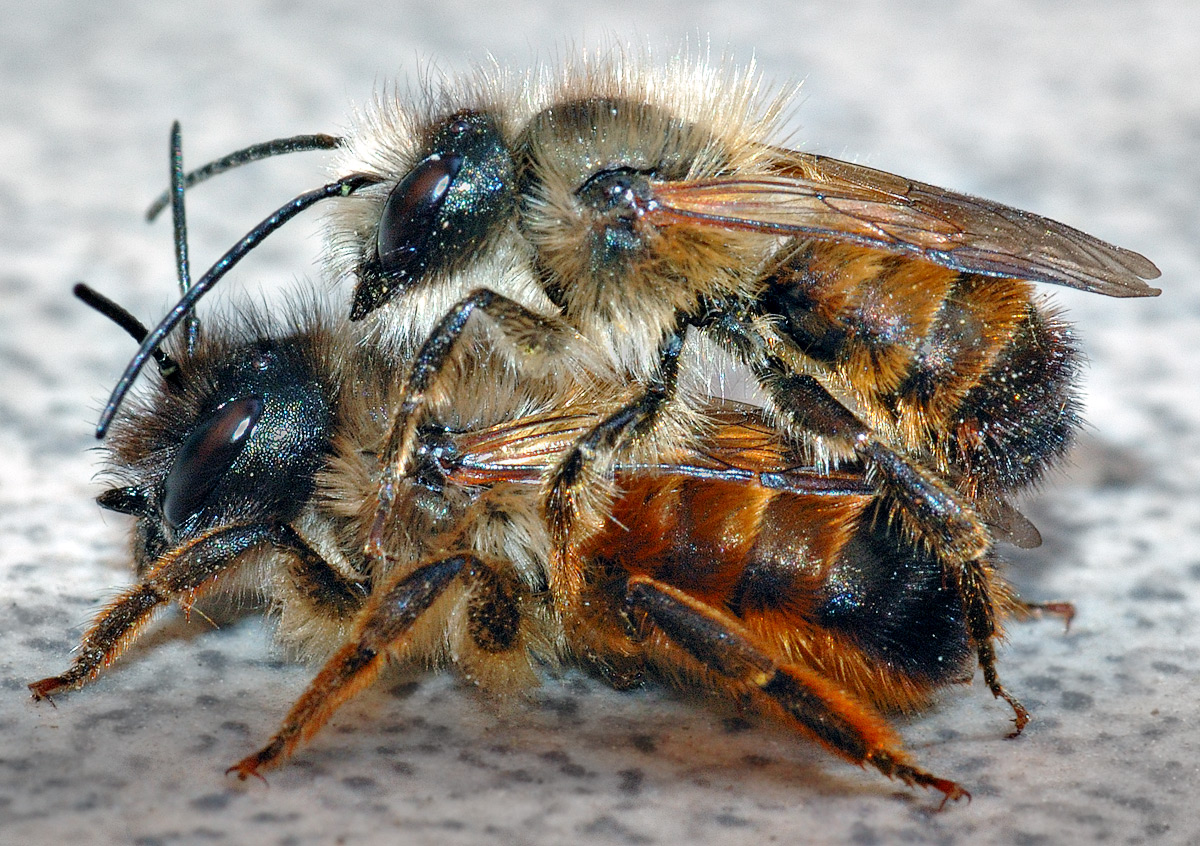
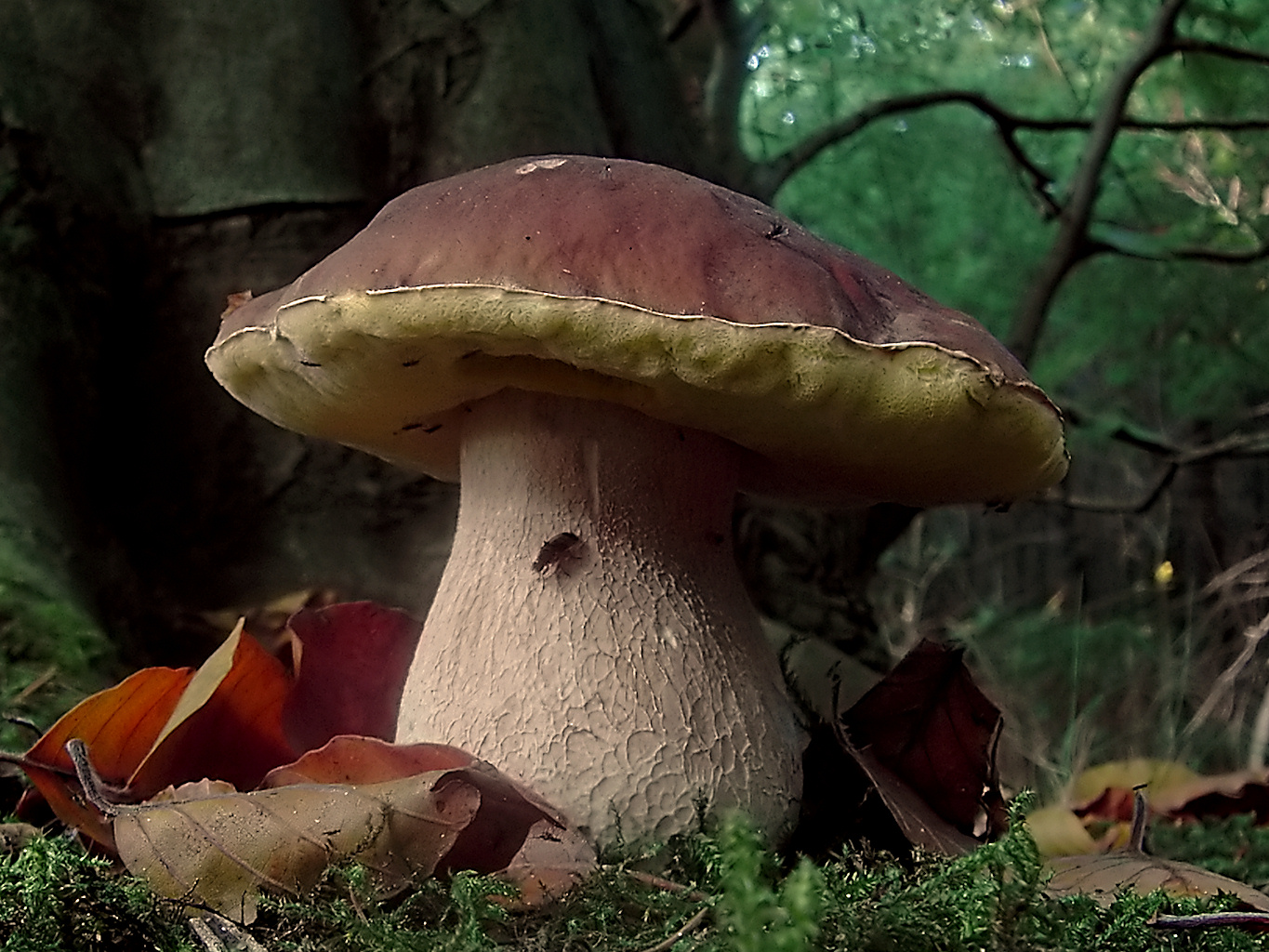
- From left to right in each row, top to bottom: Rhodomonas salina (Cryptophyta), Ranunculus asiaticus (Viridiplantae), Euglena (Euglenozoa), Leocarpus fragilis (Amoebozoa), Ammonia tepida (Rhizaria), a vorticellid (Alveolata), Osmia bicornis (Animalia), Boletus edulis (Fungi)

Scientific classification
- Domain: Eukaryota (Chatton, 1925) Whittaker & Margulis, 1978

Major subdivisions
- Amorphea; Amoebozoa; Obazoa (including animals and fungi); Ancyromonadida; CRuMs; Discoba; Malawimonadida; Metamonada; Diaphoretickes; Archaeplastida (including land plants); Pancryptista; Disparia; Haptista; Telonemia; SAR (including brown algae)

Synonyms
- Eucarya Woese et al. 1990; Eukarya Margulis 1996

= Eukaryote =

Eukaryotes Temporal range: Statherian–Present 1650–0 Ma

Domain of life whose cells have nuclei

The eukaryotes (/juːˈkærioʊts, -əts/) are cellular organisms of the domain Eukaryota or Eukarya, which have a distinct cell nucleus (formed by a nuclear membrane), membrane-bound organelles and organization supported by a cytoskeleton. Extant eukaryotes are traditionally grouped into four kingdoms: animals, plants, fungi and protists.

Protists are a basal paraphyletic group that includes all algae, amoebae, flagellates and ciliates. As part of the prevailing three-domain system, eukaryotes constitute a major group of organisms alongside the two domains of prokaryotes: Bacteria and Archaea.

Cladistically, eukaryotes emerged within the archaeal phylum Promethearchaeota, colloquially also known as "Asgard archaea". Ignoring mitochondrial DNA (which comes from a bacterial lineage rather than an archaeal one), this would imply only two domains of life, Bacteria and Archaea, with eukaryotes incorporated as a clade under the Archaea.

Eukaryotes first emerged during the Paleoproterozoic, and the leading evolutionary theory is that they were the result of a metabolically mutualistic symbiogenesis between an anaerobic Promethearchaeota archaeon and an endosymbiont aerobic alphaproteobacterium (forming the proto-mitochondrion) in response to the oxidative stress following the Great Oxygenation Event. A second symbiogenetic event between an eukaryotic host (a protist) and a beta-cyanobacteria endosymbiont during the Mesoproterozoic led to the latter becoming chloroplasts, and resulted in the evolution of the photosynthetic clade Archaeplastida, which includes all green algae, red algae, glaucophytes and land plants.

Eukaryotes can be unicellular or multicellular, and their cell sizes are significantly (hundreds of times) larger than prokaryotes. They have biomembranes enclosing their nucleus and organelles such as the endoplasmic reticulum, Golgi apparatus, ribosome, vacuole and lysosome, as well as endosymbiont-derived organelles (which are bound by two or more layers of membrane) such as mitochondria and various plastids. Eukaryotes can reproduce both asexually through mitosis, and sexually through meiosis and gamete fusion (fertilization). Due to their larger size and more complex cellular architecture, eukaryotes are capable of morphogenesis and phagocytosis, which enables microscopic predation of other unicellular organisms. Multicellularity in some eukaryotes led to cell differentiation and functional specialization, which led to the formation of various organs and tissues and the development of organ systems. Eukaryotes represent only a small minority of the total number of organisms on Earth, but due to their generally much larger sizes, their collective global biomass is much greater than that of prokaryotes.

== Etymology ==
The word eukaryote is derived from the Greek words "eu" (εὖ) meaning "true" or "good" and "karyon" (κάρυον) meaning "nut" or "kernel", referring to the nucleus of a cell.

== Diversity ==
Eukaryotes are organisms that range from microscopic single cells, such as picozoans under 3 micrometers across, to animals like the blue whale, weighing up to 190 tonnes and measuring up to 33.6 meters (110 ft) long, or plants like the coast redwood, up to 120 meters (390 ft) tall. Many eukaryotes are unicellular; the informal grouping called protists includes many of these, with some multicellular forms like the giant kelp up to 200 feet (61 m) long. The multicellular eukaryotes include the animals, plants, and fungi, but again, these groups too contain many unicellular species. Eukaryotic cells are typically much larger than those of prokaryotes—the bacteria and the archaea—having a volume of around 10,000 times greater. Eukaryotes represent a small minority of the number of organisms, but, as many of them are much larger, their collective global biomass (468 gigatons) is far larger than that of prokaryotes (77 gigatons), with plants alone accounting for over 81% of the total biomass of Earth.

The eukaryotes are a diverse lineage, consisting mainly of microscopic organisms. Multicellularity in some form has evolved independently at least 25 times within the eukaryotes. Complex multicellular organisms, not counting the aggregation of amoebae to form slime molds, have evolved within only six eukaryotic lineages: animals, symbiomycotan fungi, brown algae, red algae, green algae, and land plants. Eukaryotes are grouped by genomic similarities, so that groups often lack visible shared characteristics.

Eukaryotes range in size from single-celled organisms to huge trees and whales.

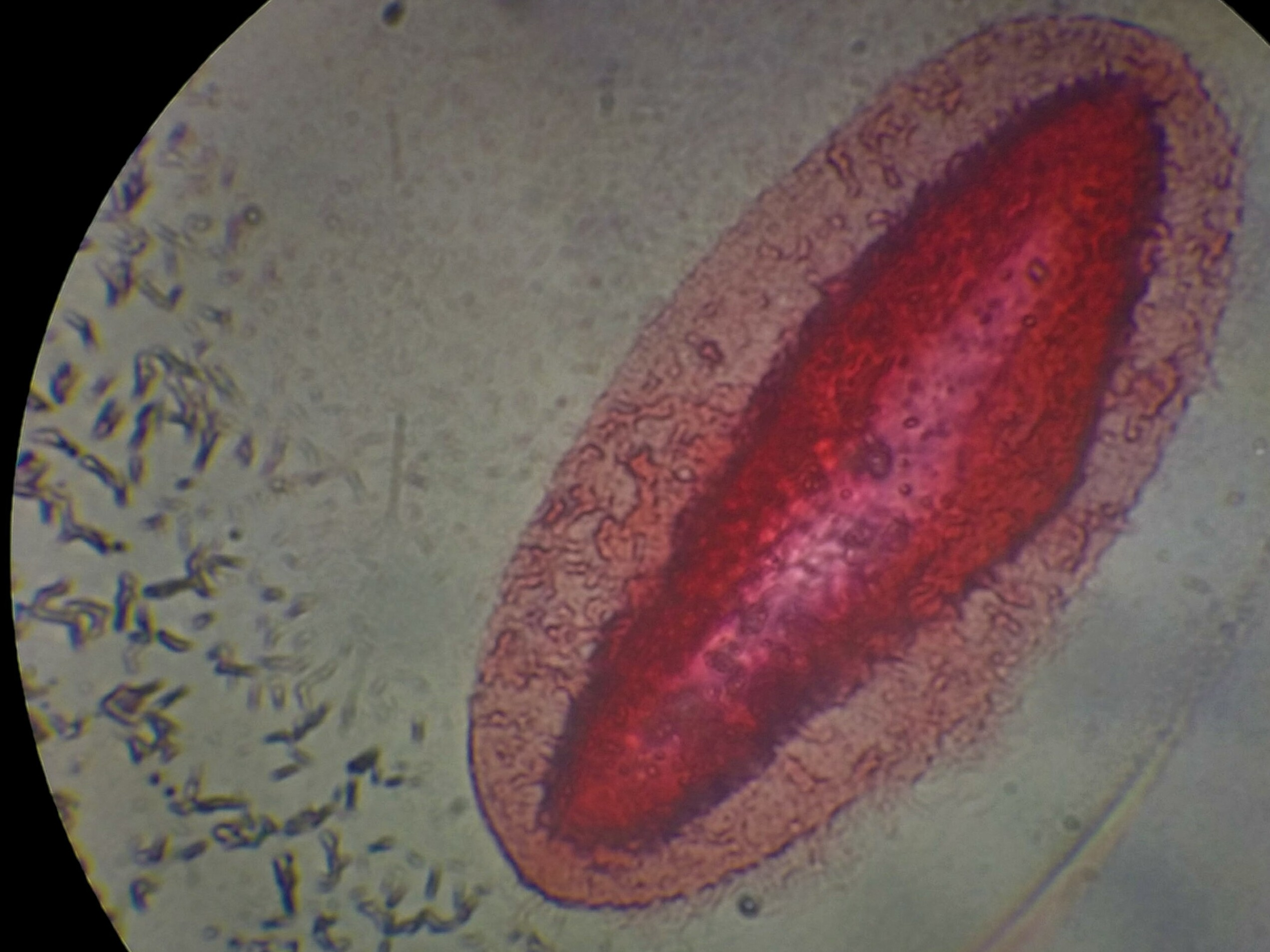
Prokaryotes (small cylindrical cells, bacteria, on left) and a single-celled eukaryote, Paramecium

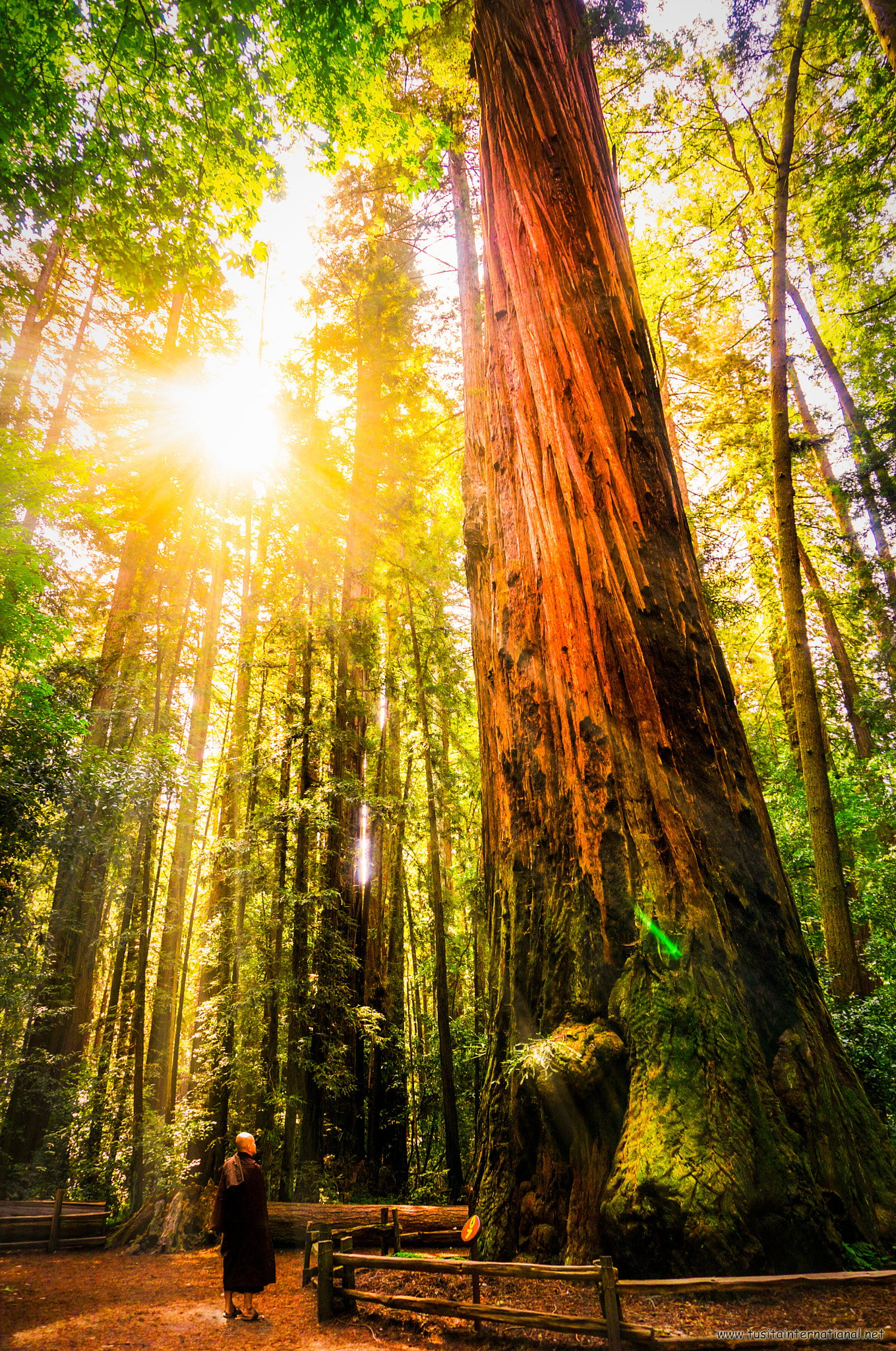
Coast redwood

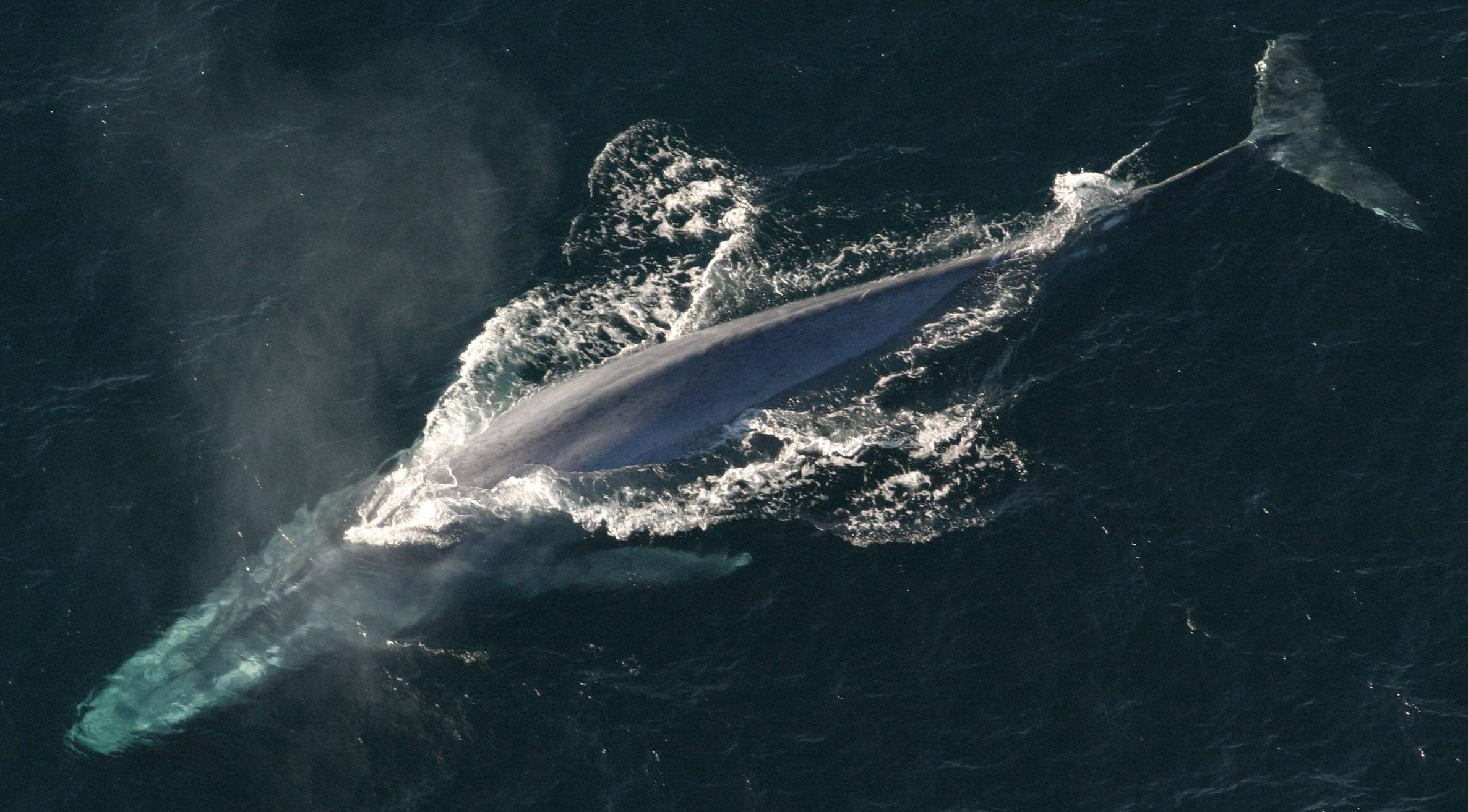
Blue whale

== Distinguishing features ==
=== Nucleus ===
The defining feature of eukaryotes is their membrane-bound nucleus, distinguishing them from prokaryotes that lack a nucleus. Eukaryotic cells are often much larger and contain more genetic information than bacterial cells. This genetic information is divided into multiple linear molecules of DNA called chromosomes, which are contained inside the nucleus.

Chromosomes are packaged into a highly organized structure called chromatin by histone proteins. Chromatin is further organized by other DNA binding proteins, which regulate the folded shape of chromosomes. During mitotic division, these chromosomes compacted and separated into two matching sets by a microtubular spindle.

=== Internal membranes ===
Prokaryote, to same scale

Eukaryotic cell with endomembrane system

Eukaryotic cells are about 10,000 times larger than prokaryotic cells by volume, and contain membrane-bound organelles.

Eukaryote cells include a variety of membrane-bound structures, together forming the endomembrane system. Simple compartments, called vesicles and vacuoles, can form by budding off other membranes. Many cells ingest food and other materials through a process of endocytosis, where the outer membrane invaginates and then pinches off to form a vesicle. Some cell products can leave in a vesicle through exocytosis.

The nucleus is surrounded by a double membrane known as the nuclear envelope, with nuclear pores that allow material to move in and out. Various tube- and sheet-like extensions of the nuclear membrane form the endoplasmic reticulum, which is involved in protein transport and maturation. It includes the rough endoplasmic reticulum, covered in ribosomes which synthesize proteins; these enter the interior space or lumen. Subsequently, they generally enter vesicles, which bud off from the smooth endoplasmic reticulum. In most eukaryotes, these protein-carrying vesicles are released and their contents further modified in stacks of flattened vesicles (cisternae), the Golgi apparatus.

Vesicles may be specialized; for instance, lysosomes contain digestive enzymes that break down biomolecules in the cytoplasm.

=== Mitochondria ===
Mitochondria are essentially universal in the eukaryotes, and with their own DNA somewhat resemble prokaryotic cells.

Mitochondria are organelles in eukaryotic cells. The mitochondrion is commonly called "the powerhouse of the cell", for its function providing energy by oxidizing sugars or fats to produce the energy-storing molecule ATP. Mitochondria have two surrounding membranes, each a phospholipid bilayer, the inner of which is folded into invaginations called cristae where aerobic respiration takes place.

Mitochondria contain their own DNA, which is circular like bacterial DNA, from which it originated, and which encodes rRNA and tRNA genes that produce RNA which is closer in structure to bacterial RNA than to eukaryote RNA.

Some eukaryotes, such as the metamonads Giardia and Trichomonas, and the amoebozoan Pelomyxa, appear to lack mitochondria, but all contain mitochondrion-derived organelles, like hydrogenosomes or mitosomes, having lost their mitochondria secondarily. They obtain energy by enzymatic action in the cytoplasm. It is thought that mitochondria developed from prokaryotic cells which became endosymbionts living inside eukaryotes.

=== Plastids ===
The most common type of plastid is the chloroplast, which contains chlorophyll and produces organic compounds by photosynthesis.

Plants and various groups of algae have plastids as well as mitochondria. Plastids, like mitochondria, have their own DNA and are developed from endosymbionts, in this case cyanobacteria. They usually take the form of chloroplasts which, like cyanobacteria, contain chlorophyll and produce organic compounds (such as glucose) through photosynthesis. Others are involved in storing food. Although plastids probably had a single origin, not all plastid-containing groups are closely related. Instead, some eukaryotes have obtained them from other eukaryotes through secondary endosymbiosis or ingestion. The capture and sequestering of photosynthetic cells and chloroplasts, kleptoplasty, occurs in many types of modern eukaryotic organisms.

=== Cytoskeletal structures ===
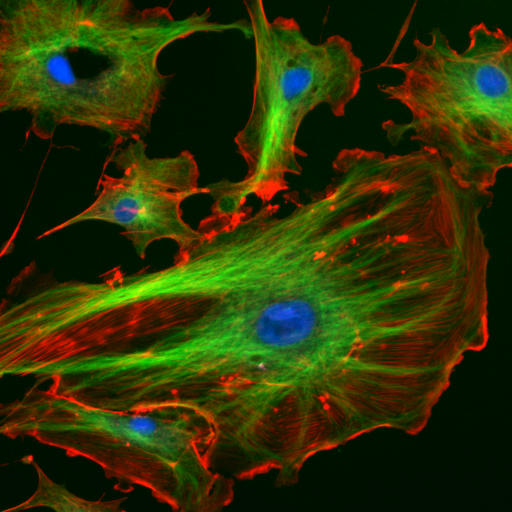
The cytoskeleton. Actin filaments are shown in red, microtubules in green. (The nucleus is in blue.)

The cytoskeleton provides stiffening structure and points of attachment for motor structures that enable the cell to move, change shape, or transport materials. The motor structures are microfilaments of actin and actin-binding proteins. These include α-actinin, fimbrin, and filamin in submembranous cortical layers and bundles. Motor proteins of microtubules, dynein and kinesin, and myosin of actin filaments, make the network dynamic.

Many eukaryotes have long slender motile cytoplasmic projections, called flagella, or multiple shorter structures called cilia. These organelles are variously involved in movement, feeding, and sensation. They are composed mainly of tubulin, and are entirely distinct from prokaryotic flagella. They are supported by a bundle of microtubules arising from a centriole, characteristically arranged as nine doublets surrounding two singlets. Flagella may have hairs (mastigonemes), as in many stramenopiles. Their interior is continuous with the cell's cytoplasm.

Centrioles are often present, even in cells and groups that do not have flagella, but conifers and flowering plants have neither. They generally occur in groups that give rise to various microtubular roots. These form a primary component of the cytoskeleton, and are often assembled over the course of several cell divisions, with one flagellum retained from the parent and the other derived from it. Centrioles produce the spindle during nuclear division.

=== Cell wall ===
The cells of plants, algae, fungi and most chromalveolates, but not animals, are surrounded by a cell wall. This is a layer outside the cell membrane, providing the cell with structural support, protection, and a filtering mechanism. The cell wall also prevents over-expansion when water enters the cell.

The major polysaccharides making up the primary cell wall of land plants are cellulose, hemicellulose, and pectin. The cellulose microfibrils are linked together with hemicellulose, embedded in a pectin matrix. The most common hemicellulose in the primary cell wall is xyloglucan.

=== Sexual reproduction ===
Sexual reproduction requires a life cycle that alternates between a haploid phase, with one copy of each chromosome in the cell, and a diploid phase, with two copies. In eukaryotes, haploid gametes are produced by meiosis; two gametes fuse to form a diploid zygote.

Eukaryotes have a life cycle that involves sexual reproduction, alternating between a haploid phase, where only one copy of each chromosome is present in each cell, and a diploid phase, with two copies of each chromosome in each cell. The diploid phase is formed by fusion of two haploid gametes, such as eggs and spermatozoa, to form a zygote; this may grow into a body, with its cells dividing by mitosis, and at some stage produce haploid gametes through meiosis, a division that reduces the number of chromosomes and creates genetic variability. There is considerable variation in this pattern. Plants have both haploid and diploid multicellular phases. Eukaryotes have lower metabolic rates and longer generation times than prokaryotes, because they are larger and therefore have a smaller surface area to volume ratio.

The evolution of sexual reproduction may be a primordial characteristic of eukaryotes. Based on a phylogenetic analysis, Dacks and Roger have proposed that facultative sex was present in the group's common ancestor. A core set of genes that function in meiosis is present in both Trichomonas vaginalis and Giardia intestinalis, two organisms previously thought to be asexual. Since these two species are descendants of lineages that diverged early from the eukaryotic evolutionary tree, core meiotic genes, and hence sex, were likely present in the common ancestor of eukaryotes. Species once thought to be asexual, such as Leishmania parasites, have a sexual cycle. Amoebae, previously regarded as asexual, may be anciently sexual; while present-day asexual groups could have arisen recently.

=== Biochemistry ===
Eukaryotes differ from prokaryotes in multiple ways, with unique biochemical pathways such as sterane synthesis. The eukaryotic signature proteins have no homology to proteins in other domains of life, but appear to be universal among eukaryotes. They include the proteins of the cytoskeleton, the complex transcription machinery, the membrane-sorting systems, the nuclear pore, and some enzymes in the biochemical pathways.

== Evolution ==
=== History of classification ===
In antiquity, the two lineages of animals and plants were recognized by Aristotle and Theophrastus. The lineages were given the taxonomic rank of kingdom by Linnaeus in the 18th century. Though he included the fungi with plants with some reservations, it was later realized that they are quite distinct and warrant a separate kingdom. The various single-cell eukaryotes were originally placed with plants or animals when they became known. In 1818, the German biologist Georg A. Goldfuss coined the word Protozoa to refer to organisms such as ciliates, and this group was expanded until Ernst Haeckel made it a kingdom encompassing all single-celled eukaryotes, the Protista, in 1866. The eukaryotes thus came to be seen as four kingdoms:

- Kingdom Protista
- Kingdom Plantae
- Kingdom Fungi
- Kingdom Animalia

The protists were at that time thought to be "primitive forms", and thus an evolutionary grade, united by their primitive unicellular nature. Understanding of the oldest branchings in the tree of life only developed substantially with DNA sequencing, leading to a system of domains rather than kingdoms as top level rank being put forward by Carl Woese, Otto Kandler, and Mark Wheelis in 1990, uniting all the eukaryote kingdoms in the domain "Eucarya", stating, however, that "'eukaryotes' will continue to be an acceptable common synonym". In 1996, the evolutionary biologist Lynn Margulis proposed to replace kingdoms and domains with "inclusive" names to create a "symbiosis-based phylogeny", giving the description "Eukarya (symbiosis-derived nucleated organisms)".

=== Phylogeny ===
By the early 21st century, a rough consensus started to emerge from phylogenomic studies. The majority of eukaryotes can be placed in one of two large clades dubbed Amorphea (similar in composition to the unikont hypothesis) and the Diphoda (formerly bikonts), which includes plants and most algal lineages. A third major grouping, the Excavata, has been abandoned as a formal group as it was found to be paraphyletic. The proposed phylogeny below includes two groups of excavates (Discoba and Metamonada), and incorporates the 2021 proposal that picozoans are close relatives of rhodophytes. The Provora are a group of microbial predators discovered in 2022. TSAR is a possible clade that would contain Telonemia and the SAR supergroup.

- Promethearchaeota (Asgard archaea)
  - Other Asgard archaea
  - - - Eukaryota 2200 mya
        - - Opimoda
            - Ancyromonadida
            - - Malawimonadida
              - Podiata
                - CRuMs
                - Amorphea 1500 mya
                  - Amoebozoa
                  - Obazoa
                    - Breviatea
                    - - Apusomonadida
                      - Opisthokonta 1300 mya
                        - Holomycota (inc. fungi)
                        - Holozoa (inc. animals)
        - Diphoda Bikonts
          - - Metamonada
            - Discoba
          - Diaphoretickes
            - CAM
              - Pancryptista
                - Microheliella
                - Cryptista
              - Archaeplastida 1600 mya
                - - Rhodophyta (red algae)
                  - Picozoa
                - - 1100 mya
                    Glaucophyta
                  - 1000 mya
                    Viridiplantae (plants)
            - - - Haptista
              - Telonemia
              - - Disparia
                  - Provora
                  - Membrifera
              - SAR
                - 550 mya
                  Rhizaria
                - Halvaria
                  - Alveolata
                  - Stramenopiles (inc brown algae)
    - - "Wenzhongarchaeales"
      - "Hodarchaeales"

One view of the great kingdoms and their stem groups. The Metamonada are hard to place, being sister possibly to Discoba or to Malawimonadida or being a paraphyletic group external to all other eukaryotes. Eukaryotes are thought to have emerged within the archaeal phylum Promethearchaeota.

=== Origin of eukaryotes ===
Reconstruction of LECA. Key: 1) Nucleus with nucleolus and eu/heterochromatin 2) Endoplasmic reticulum 3) Peroxisome 4) Endo/lysosome, ESCRT system 5) Golgi apparatus 6) Endo/exocytosis, actin-based 7) Pseudo/Filopodium 8) Sterol-based membrane; G3P + ester bond phospholipids 9) Microtubule-based cytoskeleton and organising centre 10) Basal bodies 11) Vacuoles 12) Iron-sulphur cluster biosynthesis via the CIA system 13) Mitochondria 14) Flagella, microtubule-based

The origin of the eukaryotic cell, or eukaryogenesis, is a milestone in the evolution of life, since eukaryotes include all complex cells and almost all multicellular organisms. The last eukaryotic common ancestor (LECA) is the hypothetical origin of all living eukaryotes, and was most likely a biological population, not a single individual. The LECA is believed to have been a protist with a nucleus, at least one centriole and flagellum, facultatively aerobic mitochondria, sex (meiosis and syngamy), a dormant cyst with a cell wall of chitin or cellulose, and peroxisomes.

The presence of eukaryotic biomarkers in archaea points towards an archaeal origin, except for mitochondrial DNA, which is bacterial in origin. The genomes of Promethearchaeota archaea have plenty of eukaryotic signature protein genes, which play a crucial role in the development of the cytoskeleton and complex cellular structures characteristic of eukaryotes. In 2022, cryo-electron tomography demonstrated that Promethearchaeota archaea have a complex actin-based cytoskeleton, providing the first direct visual evidence of the archaeal ancestry of eukaryotes.

=== Symbiogenesis ===
An endosymbiotic union between a motile anaerobic archaean and an aerobic alphaproteobacterium gave rise to the LECA and all eukaryotes with mitochondria. A second, much later endosymbiosis with a cyanobacterium gave rise to the ancestor of plants, with chloroplasts.

=== Fossils ===
The timing of the origin of eukaryotes is hard to determine. Multiple different fossils that may be early eukaryotes have been suggested, but remain contested. Fossils that are clearly related to modern groups start appearing an estimated 1.2 billion years ago, in the form of red algae, though fossilized Vindhyan filamentous algae have been suggested to be as much as 1.6 to 1.7 billion years old, rather than Cambrian as previously thought. A 2026 study suggests that early fossil eukaryotes (1.75-1.4 Gya) may have been benthic aerobes, living on the bottom of oxygenated waters, and may not have colonised planktonic environments until much later, after 1 Gya.

Fossils from the Ruyang Group of China, dating to approximately 1.8-1.6 billion years ago, may be the oldest known eukaryotes. One possible earliest multicellular eukaryote fossil is Qingshania magnifica from North China, which lived 1.635 billion years ago. This would suggest that the crown group eukaryotes originated in the late Paleoproterozoic (Statherian). Other early unicellular eukaryotes, Tappania plana, Shuiyousphaeridium macroreticulatum, Dictyosphaera macroreticulata, Germinosphaera alveolata, and Valeria lophostriata from North China, lived approximately 1.65 billion years ago.

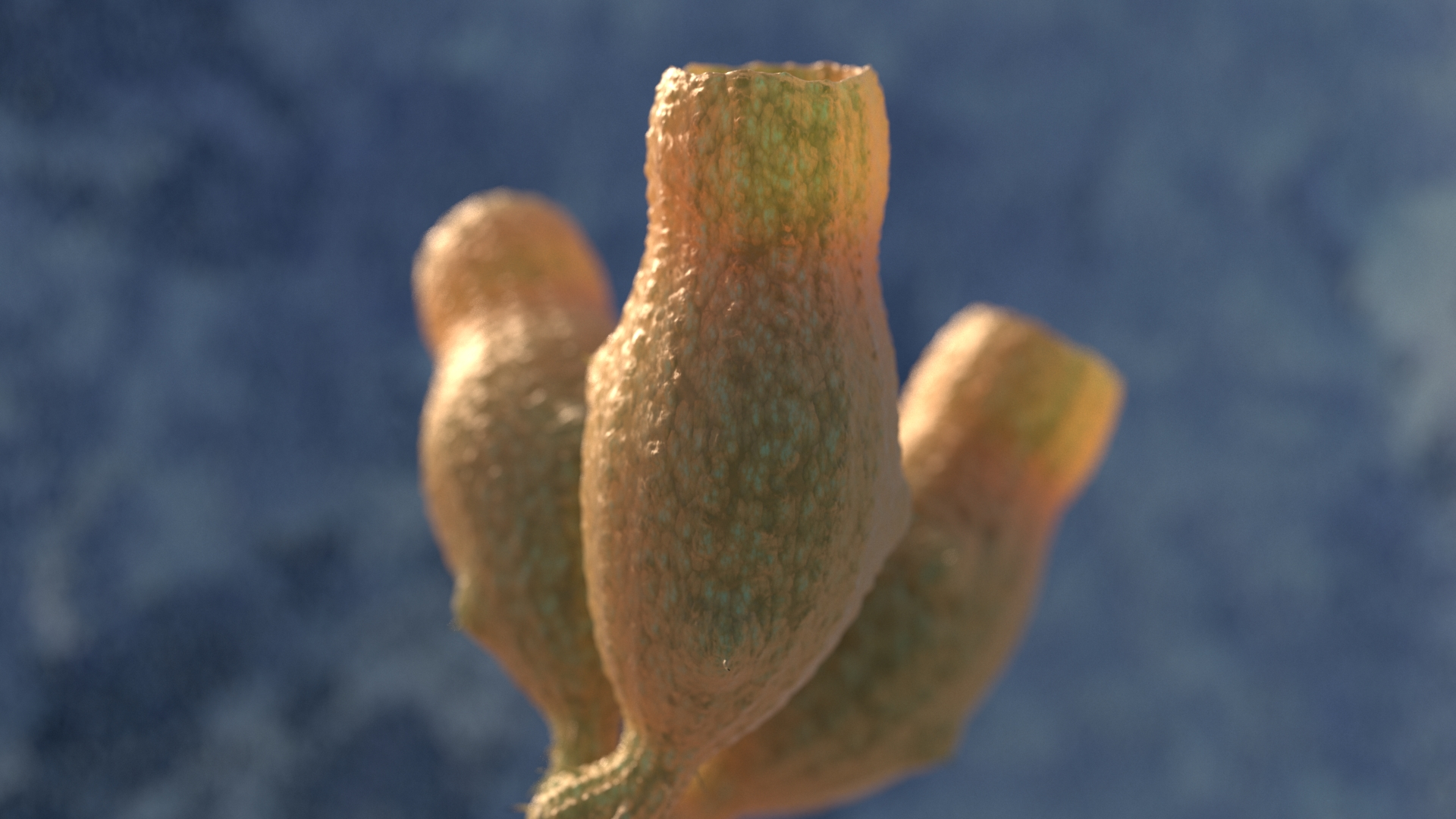
Reconstruction of the problematic Diskagma buttonii, a terrestrial fossil less than 1mm high, from rocks around 2.2 billion years old

Some acritarchs are known from at least 1.65 billion years ago, and a fossil, Grypania, which may be an alga, is as much as 2.1 billion years old. The "problematic" fossil Diskagma has been found in paleosols 2.2 billion years old. The Neoarchean fossil Thuchomyces shares some similarities with fungi. It especially resembles the problematic fossil Diskagma, with hyphae and multiple differentiated layers. However, it is over 600 million years older than all other possible eukaryotes, and many of its "eukaryote features" are not specific to the clade, meaning it is almost certainly a microbial mat instead.

Structures proposed to represent "large colonial organisms" have been found in the black shales of the Palaeoproterozoic such as the Francevillian B Formation, in Gabon, dubbed the "Francevillian biota" which is dated at 2.1 billion years old. However, the status of these structures as fossils is contested, with other authors suggesting that they might represent pseudofossils.

The presence of steranes, eukaryotic-specific biomarkers, in Australian shales previously indicated that eukaryotes were present in these rocks dated at 2.7 billion years old, but these Archaean biomarkers have been rebutted as later contaminants. The oldest valid biomarker records are only around 800 million years old. In contrast, a molecular clock analysis suggests the emergence of sterol biosynthesis as early as 2.3 billion years ago. The nature of steranes as eukaryotic biomarkers is further complicated by the production of sterols by some bacteria.

Whenever their origins, eukaryotes may not have become ecologically dominant until much later; a massive increase in the zinc composition of marine sediments 800 million years ago has been attributed to the rise of substantial populations of eukaryotes, which preferentially consume and incorporate zinc relative to prokaryotes, approximately a billion years after their origin (at the latest).

== See also ==
- Eukaryote hybrid genome
- List of sequenced eukaryotic genomes
- Parakaryon myojinensis
