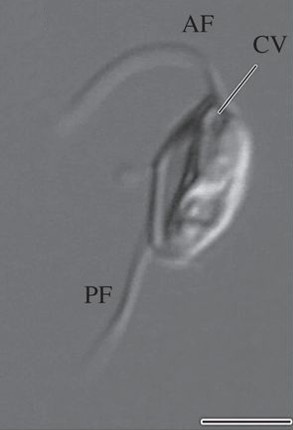
- Micrograph of M. marocensis under differential interference contrast, showing anterior (AF) and posterior (PF) flagella and contractile vacuole (CV)

Scientific classification
- Domain: Eukaryota
- Class: Jakobea
- Order: Jakobida
- Suborder: Histionina
- Family: Moramonadidae; Strassert et al., 2016
- Genus: Moramonas; Strassert et al., 2016
- Species: M. marocensis

Binomial name
- Moramonas marocensis Strassert et al., 2016

= Moramonas =

Genus of terrestrial flagellates

Moramonas (from Latin mora 'delay' and Greek monás 'unit') is a genus of freely swimming jakobid flagellates. It contains a single species, M. marocensis (from Latin Marocum 'Morocco'), which was isolated from a desert soil sample collected near Zagora, Morocco. It is classified in the family Moramonadidae along with an undescribed jakobid, ‘Seculomonas ecuadoriensis’, in the suborder Histionina.

Moramonas presents morphological traits commonly seen in other jakobids. Its cells have two flagella inserted at the anterior region, of which the posterior has one vane with striations. A dorsal 'fan' that supports much of the cell arises from near the basal body of the anterior flagellum. Several microtubule roots arise close to the basal body of the posterior flagellum and support the ventral groove, a structure used for ingesting bacteria. However, its cells include three spherical mitochondria, unlike all other jakobids which have fewer mitochondria. It also differs from other jakobids in the absence of a lorica (present in the closely related Reclinomonas and Histiona) and the presence of a paranuclear body (seen elsewhere only in Andalucia godoyi).

== Etymology ==
The generic name Moramonas derives from Latin mora, meaning 'delay', 'pause', and from Ancient Greek monás (μονάς), meaning 'unit', a common suffix for flagellates. The specific epithet marocensis refers to the country of its discovery, Morocco (from Latin Marocum).

== Description ==
=== Morphology ===
Moramonas marocensis is a species of jakobids, single-celled protists that move using two flagella and have a ventral groove for feeding on bacteria. Each cell is naked (without the lorica present in some other jakobids), elliptical, 7–13 μm long and 3–5 μm wide. They can form spherical cysts, 5–6 μm in diameter, with a smooth amorphous envelope surrounding them. The two flagella arise on the anterior side of the cell. The anterior one (13–14 μm long) propels the cell, which swims freely in a usually straight trajectory while rotating around its own axis. The posterior flagellum (16–22 μm long) undulates in the ventral groove and has a vane with striations; its role in cell movement is unclear. The posterior flagellum has a 2.5 μm long acroneme (visibly thinner tip).

=== Cell ultrastructure ===
M. marocensis cells have one nucleus each (2.4–3.8 μm in diameter), located at the center, slightly towards the anterior side of the cell and with a central nucleolus. The cytoplasm contains three or less mitochondria with tubular or saccular-vesicular cristae. It may contain small reserve granules and symbiotic bacteria, sometimes observed dividing. Near the nucleus, a small microbody is present, resembling the paranuclear body of some excavates. At the anterior pole is a single contractile vacuole surrounded by smaller vacuoles. No Golgi apparatus, cytostome, and no connection between the nucleus and the flagellar basal bodies (such as a rhizoplast) have been observed.

Five to six microtubules appear close to the basal body of the posterior flagellum, forming the flagellar root known as 'right root' (R2). This root goes through the right side of the ventral groove, where it increases in the number of microtubules, and divides into an internal and external root formed by five and ten microtubules, respectively. The 'left root' (R1) arises in the same location and consists initially of four microtubules, increasing to more than 15 towards the posterior side of the cell. This root supports the floor of the ventral groove. A singlet root formed by one microtubule occupies the space between R1 and R2. The dorsal and lateral sides of the cell are, instead, supported by a 'fan' of microtubules associated to an electron-dense (opaque under transmission electron microscopy) sheet. The fan originates close to the basal body of the anterior flagellum.

The basal bodies of both flagella are orthogonal (at a right angle) to each other, connected by small fibrils. At the level of the cell membrane, both flagella have a distinctive transversal plate. The basal body of the posterior flagellum is followed by a thin plate.

=== Distinction from other jakobids ===
M. marocensis presents typical jakobid features, namely a dorsal fan arising near the basal body of the anterior flagellum and a single dorsal vane with striations along the posterior flagellum. Its contractile vacuole distinguishes this species from marine jakobids, and it differs from the closely related Reclinomonas and Histiona by the absence of a lorica. Among all jakobids, the paranuclear body found in M. marocensis is only observed in Andalucia godoyi. Lastly, the presence of three spherical mitochondria is unique, as no other studied jakobids have three or more mitochondria.

== Taxonomy ==
Type locality of Moramonas marocensis in Morocco, near Zagora

Moramonas marocensis was isolated from a sample of desert soil collected in 2007 near Zagora, Morocco, in a small valley separated from the Sahara by a mountain ridge. A phylogenetic analysis using the SSU rRNA gene showed that the organism belongs to the Jakobida. A multiprotein anlaysis confirmed it as the closest relative of a yet undescribed jakobid, known as ‘Seculamonas ecuadoriensis’, both forming the sister clade to Reclinomonas and Histiona, within the suborder Histionina.

Due to the genetic distance between M. marocensis and all other jakobids, the family Moramonadidae was proposed to accommodate it. This family includes the species ‘S. ecuadoriensis’, which is still not formally described and may be eventually added to the genus Moramonas. Below is a cladogram depicting the evolutionary relationships between Moramonas and other jakobids, according to multigene phylogenetic analyses published in 2018 and 2023.

- Jakobida
  - - Histionina
      - - Moramonadidae
          - Moramonas
          - ‘Seculamonas’
      - - Jakobidae
          Jakoba
        - Histionidae
          - Histiona
          - Reclinomonas
    - Andalucina
      - Andalucia
      - Stygiella
  - - Ophirinina
      - Ophirina
      - Agogonia
