= Eolouka =

Scientific classification (obsolete as paraphyletic)
- Domain: Eukaryota
- Clade: Discoba
- Phylum: Eolouka; Cavalier-Smith, 2013 stat. nov.

Groups included
- Jakobea; Tsukubea

Cladistically included but traditionally excluded taxa
- Discicristata; Euglenozoa; Percolozoa

Phylum of flagellated protists

Eolouka is an obsolete paraphyletic phylum of protists localized in the clade Discoba. It contains two lineages: Jakobea and Tsukubea, the last containing only one genus, Tsukubamonas.

== History of classification ==
In 1999 Cavalier-Smith proposed a new paraphyletic phylum of flagellates called Loukozoa, containing only the jakobids. In 2013 it was modified to contain three subphyla:

- Eolouka, containing the classes Jakobea and Tsukubea.
- Metamonada, containing the infraphyla Trichozoa and Anaeromonada.
- Neolouka, containing the only class Malawimonadea.

However, in later years these three groups were raised to the rank of phylum.
