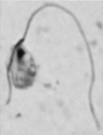
- Stygiella incarcerata under light microscopy stained with protargol
- Velundella nauta under DIC microscopy

Scientific classification
- Domain: Eukaryota
- Class: Jakobea
- Order: Jakobida
- Suborder: Andalucina
- Family: Stygiellidae; Pánek, Táborský & Čepička 2015

Type genus
- Stygiella Pánek, Táborský & Čepička 2015

Genera
- Stygiella; Velundella

Diversity
- 6 species
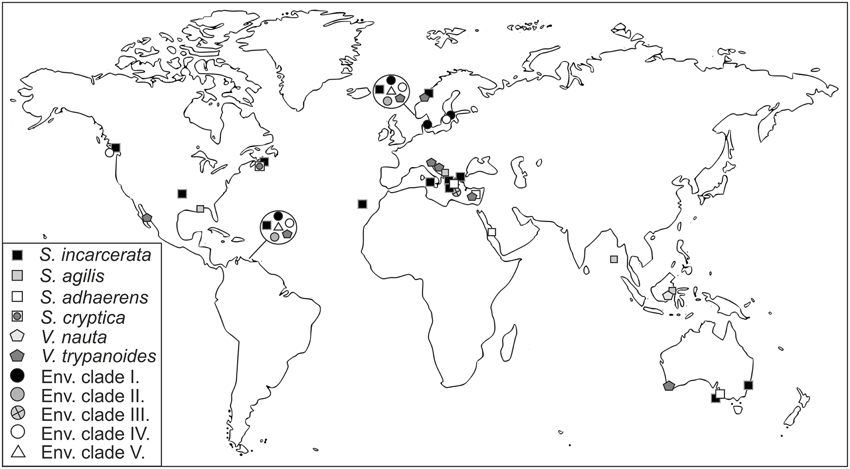
- Stygiellidae distribution map.

= Stygiellidae =

Family of saltwater protists

Stygiellidae is a family of free-living marine flagellates belonging to the order Jakobida, a deep-branching lineage within the eukaryotic supergroup Discoba. They are unicellular organisms that commonly inhabit anoxic, sulfide-rich and ammonium-rich marine habitats worldwide.

== Cell morphology and behavior ==
Members of Stygiellidae are genetically diverse but morphologically similar anaerobic jakobids. The unifying aspect of their appearance is their cristae-lacking mitochondria due to the secondary loss of aerobic metabolism. They resemble jakobid cells, and form two morphotypes: grooved cells, attached to the substrate, with a conspicuous groove; and swimming cells, with a less distinct, narrower groove. Both morphotypes move in a spiral motion, although the swimming cells are faster. It is difficult to distinguish morphological aspects between species due to the variability among cells within the same strain and the similarity between grooved and swimming cells.

== Ecology and distribution ==
Stygiellidae are bacterivorous nanoflagellates almost exclusively found in marine, oxygen-poor (anoxic or microoxic) environments, often in presence of sulfides, methane or ammonium. However, some environmental sequences of Stygiellidae have been reported in oxic waters in Saanich Inlet, without sulfide or ammonium. They are also detected in other non-marine saline environments such as brackish waters and inland salt springs, but never in freshwater habitats.

== Evolution and classification ==
=== Evolution of the anaerobic metabolism ===
The anaerobic Stygiellidae is one of two clades of the suborder Andalucina, the other clade being the aerobic Andaluciidae. Andalucina, along with Histionina and Ophirinina, are the two lineages of Jakobida, an important group in the supergroup Discoba.

- Jakobida
  - Ophirinina
  - - Histionina
    - Andalucina
      - Andaluciidae
      - Stygiellidae

Stygiellidae, unlike the rest of jakobids, have evolved to adopt an obligatory anaerobic lifestyle, and possess mitochondrion-related organelles (MROs) that lack cristae. They appear to lack all components of the electron transport chain and the TCA cycle, except for two complex I subunits, and no mitochondrial genome has been found. Instead, the MROs possess components of the pyruvate metabolism similar to the hydrogenosomes seen in Metamonada, another basal anaerobic group of eukaryotes. Overall, Stygiellidae appear to have retained a wider group of genes for the mitochondrial aminoacid metabolism than metamonads.

=== Internal phylogeny ===
Stygiellidae is a monophyletic group containing all jakobids detected in anoxic habitats. It splits into six well-supported clades: Stygiella, Velundella and four environmental clades (named EC I–IV), all of which appear strongly monophyletic.

- Stygiellidae
  - - EC I
    - - EC II
      - - EC III
        - EC IV
  - - Velundella
      - Velundella nauta
      - Velundella trypanoides
    - Stygiella
      - - Stygiella cryptica
        - Stygiella adhaerens
      - - Stygiella agilis
        - Stygiella incarcerata

=== Classification ===
The family contains 6 species distributed in 2 genera.

- Stygiella Pánek, Táborský & Čepička 2015 (4 species)
  - Stygiella incarcerata (Bernard, Simpson & Patterson 2000) Pánek, Táborský & Čepička 2015
    = Andalucia incarcerata (Bernard, Simpson & Patterson 2000) Lara et al. 2006
    = Jakoba incarcerata Bernard, Simpson & Patterson 2000
  - Stygiella adhaerens Pánek, Táborský & Čepička 2015
  - Stygiella agilis Pánek, Táborský & Čepička 2015
  - Stygiella cryptica Pánek, Táborský & Čepička 2015
- Velundella Pánek, Táborský & Čepička 2015 (2 species)
  - Velundella trypanoides Pánek, Táborský & Čepička 2015
  - Velundella nauta Pánek, Táborský & Čepička 2015
