= Imasa =

Scientific classification
- Domain: Eukaryota
- Phylum: Malawimonada
- Class: Malawimonadea
- Order: Malawimonadida
- Family: Imasidae; Heiss, Simpson & Kim 2020
- Genus: Imasa; Heiss, Simpson & Kim 2020
- Species: I. heleensis

Binomial name
- Imasa heleensis Heiss, Simpson & Kim 2020

Type strain
- AMNH_IZC 00343331

Genus of flagellated protists

Imasa is a genus of marine flagellates containing the single species Imasa heleensis, discovered in 2020 in the Solomon Islands. It is the first marine member of a basal group of eukaryotes known as Malawimonadida. It is the only member of the family Imasidae.

== Etymology ==
Location of Hele, the type locality of Imasa heleensis in Solomon Islands

The genus name Imasa is the name of the research vessel used to obtain the cells of Imasa heleensis that were isolated. It refers to the pause taken by a crocodile between its emergence from the water and its attack. This pause between actions is resembled by the movement of the anterior flagellum of Imasa, which often appears to pause near the point between the extension and recovery strokes. The specific epithet heleensis refers to 'Hele', which is the name of the isles containing the collection site of Imasa heleensis at Solomon Islands. As with the genus name, it is common among the indigenous languages of the region.

== Characteristics ==
=== Morphology ===
Imasa heleensis was isolated from a marine shallow lagoon. Like the other two accepted species of malawimonads Gefionella okellyi and Malawimonas jakobiformis, which were isolated from soil and freshwater respectively, Imasa is ecologically associated with a particulate substrate. However, its ability to generate a protrusion from the posterior end of the cell is unusually long (~3 μm when suspended, ~15-20 μm when adhered to the substrate) compared to its terrestrial counterparts (~1 μm in G. okellyi). As for the ventral groove, it only runs the anterior half of the cell in Imasa heleensis, while in the rest of malawimonads it runs the whole length of the cell.

An additional characteristic of Imasa is its shorter flagellar vane compared to other malawimonads. The vanes end abruptly in a steeper angle with the axoneme, which may result in the generation of fluid movement from a shorter length of the posterior flagellum.

=== Genetics ===
The mitochondrial genome of Imasa heleensis is similar to other malawimonads, except for the presence of the sdh3 gene, which is absent in any other known malawimonad.

== Systematics and evolution ==
Imasa is the first marine malawimonad taxon to be described. According to phylogenetic analyses based on SSU rRNA genes, it is the sister taxon to the rest of malawimonads, the Gefionella+Malawimonas clade. Because of this, Imasa was placed in a separate family, Imasidae, while the family Malawimonadidae was reserved for the other two genera.

- Malawimonadida
  - Imasidae marine habitats
    Imasa heleensis
  - Malawimonadidae freshwater or soil
    - Gefionella okellyi
    - - Malawimonas jakobiformis
      - "Malawimonas californiana"
