= Acrasis kona =

Scientific classification
- Domain: Eukaryota
- Supergroup: Discoba
- Phylum: Heterolobosea
- Order: Acrasida
- Family: Acrasidae
- Genus: Acrasis
- Species: A. kona

Binomial name
- Acrasis kona Brown, Silberman & Spiegel, 2011

Species of slime mould

Acrasis kona is a eukaryotic microorganism within the family Acrasidae, notable for its life cycle that alternates between unicellular and multicellular stages.

In its unicellular phase, it exists as an amoeboid cell, while under certain environmental conditions, individual cells aggregate to form a multicellular structure. This transition makes Acrasis kona a valuable model organism for studying cellular communication, differentiation, and the evolutionary origins of multicellularity.

Its dual life stages provide insights into how cells cooperate and organize into complex structures, offering parallels to processes in higher organisms. Recent genomic studies have revealed deep evolutionary roots of multicellular pathways, further highlighting its importance in understanding the origins of eukaryotic cooperation and differentiation.

== Ecology ==
Acrasis kona is typically found in soil and decaying plant material, where it thrives in moist environments rich in organic matter. This habitat supports its amoeboid lifestyle, as the organism feeds on yeast and other microrganisms.

When environmental conditions deteriorate, such as in nutrient scarcity or desiccation, Acrasis kona aggregates with neighboring cells to form a multicellular structure. It is believed that the lack of food might trigger this aggregation process, as cells begin to cluster in regions devoid of nutrients.

Once aggregated, the cells surround themselves with an extracellular slime sheath and begin developing into a multicellular sorocarp. The resulting fruiting body undergoes complex morphogenesis, including the formation of a stalk and spore production. The geographic distribution of Acrasis kona is thought to be widespread in temperate and tropical regions, although its specific range requires further investigation. It has not been noted to have obligate symbiotic relationships.

== Morphology ==
In its unicellular form, Acrasis kona resembles other amoeboid protists, exhibiting irregular shapes and dynamic pseudopodia. Its multicellular phase is marked by the formation of early aggregate structures that differentiate into fruiting bodies capable of producing spores. Cells range from 10–30 μm in length in their amoeboid phase, and the multicellular aggregates can reach up to several millimeters in length. This morphological versatility highlights its adaptability and evolutionary significance.

In addition, Acrasis kona belongs to the broader group of sorocarpic amoebae, which are characterized by the formation of fruiting bodies, a trait that distinguishes them from other amoeboid protists. The transition from the amoeboid to the multicellular stage involves intricate signaling and cellular differentiation, culminating in the production of spores within a protective extracellular matrix.

== Life cycle ==
=== Unicellular stage ===
In its initial unicellular form, Acrasis kona exists as an amoeboid cell, which exhibits dynamic pseudopodia used for locomotion and feeding. During this stage, the organism is typically found in environments with abundant food sources, such as soil or decaying organic matter, where it feeds on yeast and other microrganisms.They move and change shape in response to their environment, capturing food through phagocytosis.

=== Aggregation and multicellular stage ===
When environmental conditions become unfavorable, such as nutrient depletion or desiccation, Acrasis kona transitions to a multicellular phase. Individual amoeboid cells aggregate into a mass, forming an early aggregate structure. This aggregation is triggered by the absence of food, with the cells aggregating in regions devoid of nutrients. The aggregated cells surround themselves with an extracellular slime sheath, providing structural support and facilitating the movement of the entire group. This aggregation eventually develops into a multicellular fruiting body (sorocarp), following a distinct morphogenetic progression, including the formation of a stalk and the production of spores.

=== Sorocarp formation ===
As the aggregation of cells matures, it differentiates into a multicellular fruiting body, or "sorocarp", which consists of a stalk and an aerial spore mass. The development of the fruiting body follows a precise morphological progression:

- Stalk formation: The basal cells in the aggregation differentiate into stalk cells that encyst individually to form thick-walled cysts. These cysts help in the formation of the stalk, which continues to grow as more basal cells are added.
- Aerial spore mass: Once the stalk is fully formed, the remaining cells in the aggregation differentiate into aerial cells that elongate and form lobes. These cells proceed to encyst en masse, producing spores.
- Spore formation: The final spore mass is made up of uniformly rounded, thick-walled spores that are distinguishable from stalk cells by the presence of raised, pigmented structures called "areolae" at each spore-spore contact point. These spores are highly resilient and can survive harsh environmental conditions.

== Behavior ==
The life cycle of Acrasis kona demonstrates an interplay between unicellular independence and multicellular cooperation. Under nutrient-rich conditions, it exists as an amoeboid cell that uses pseudopodia to engulf yeast and other microrganisms. During nutrient scarcity, it aggregates into multicellular structures through chemotactic signaling. This behavior is thought to enhance survival by forming resilient fruiting bodies that release spores for dispersal. These behaviors provide insight into the evolution of eukaryotic multicellularity and cooperative strategies.

== Taxonomic history ==
The taxonomy of Acrasis kona has undergone several revisions as molecular techniques have clarified its evolutionary relationships. Initially classified as Acrasis rosea, it was later placed in the class Heterolobosea based on phylogenetic analysis.Acrasis kona was designated as a species based on morphology and molecular phylogenetics. This analysis provided a contemporary evaluation of the Acrasidae, solidifying its placement within the order Acrasida and highlighting its distinct evolutionary lineage within the phylum Excavata. This reclassification was informed by earlier studies on the actomyosin cytoskeleton of Acrasis rosea, which revealed distinct structural features and biochemical properties, helping to clarify the evolutionary differences that led to the identification of Acrasis kona as a separate species.
