= Jakoba =

- Four jakobid species, showing groove and flagella: Jakoba libera (ventral view), Stygiella incarcerata (ventral view), Reclinomonas americana (dorsal view), and Histiona aroides (ventral view)

Scientific classification
- Domain: Eukaryota
- Clade: Discoba
- Class: Jakobea
- Order: Jakobida
- Suborder: Histionina
- Family: Jakobidae; Patterson, 1990
- Genus: Jakoba; Patterson, 1990

Type species
- Jakoba libera (Ruinen, 1938) Patterson, 1990

Species
- Jakoba bahamiensis; Jakoba libera

Genus of eukaryotic organisms

Jakoba is a genus in the taxon Excavata, and currently has a single described species, Jakoba libera described by Patterson in 1990, and named in honour of Dutch botanist (Algology, Myology and Lichenology) Jakoba Ruinen. (Previously described Jakoba incarcerata has been renamed Andalucia incarcerata, and Jakoba bahamensis /Jakoba bahamiensis is not formally described.)

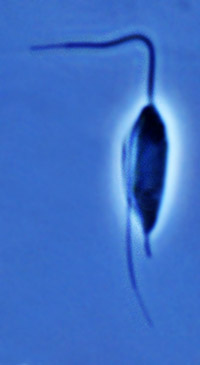
Jakoba libera, phase contrast light micrograph living cell from type culture

== Appearance and characteristics ==
Jakoba are small bacterivorous zooflagellates (jakobids) found in marine and hypersaline environments. They are free swimming trophic cells with two flagella and range between five and ten micrometers in length. Cells rotate along their longitudinal axis to allow for swimming in straight lines unless deformation and “squirming” occurs due to compression in debris. During feeding, bacteria are removed from the water column by a current created by the posterior flagellum. This current causes the bacteria to collect in the groove on the right ventral side of the cell – aiding in ingestion and the creation of food vacuoles.

== Ultrastructure ==
Cellular components for Jakoba are not particularly unique. They contain a single nucleus found close to the flagellar bases, a single Golgi body, and the mitochondrial cristae are flattened suggesting a relationship with other platicristate taxa. The mitochondria of Jakoba are of particular interest evolutionarily due to their unique bacterial-like mitochondrial genomes. It has been found that their mitochondrial genomes contain considerably more functional genes than those of other eukaryotic groups and it appears they have retained the ancestral eubacterial RNA polymerase, which has been replaced by viral type polymerase in all other mitochondriate eukaryotes. Overall, jakobid mitochondrial genomes are primitively complex in that they resemble their proteobacterial ancestors more than any other mitochondria.

== Life cycle ==
Jakoba reproduce asexually by binary fission. The sexual reproduction or the formation of cysts have not been observed.

== Molecular sequence data ==
“The circular mitochondrial genome of Jakoba libera strain ATCC 50422 is 96.6 kbp in size. Sequencing is nearly completed. At present, 77 genes have been identified, none of them including an intron. Intergenic regions account for ~ 30% of the genome and contain clusters of tandem repeats whose unit length is ~20 bp. Transcribed genes are found on both DNA strands. The standard genetic code is used for translation. Encoded genes include those commonly found in mtDNA, including the protein-coding genes nad1,2,3,4,4L,5,6, cob, cox1,2,3, and atp6,8,9, as well as large subunit (rnl) and small subunit (rns) rRNA genes and >22 tRNA genes. Also present are a number of protein genes typical of protist but not animal or fungal mtDNAs. These include nad7,9,11, atp1, rpl2,5,6,14,16, and rps2-4,11-14,19. A number of unique ORFs are also encoded by J. libera mtDNA.” “A number of J. libera mitochondrial genes are rare or absent in other mitochondrial genomes but are present in bacteria. Among these rare or unique mtDNA-encoded genes are dpo, rpoB,C, rrn5, rnpB, tufA, yejU-W, and several of the ribosomal protein genes.” “A comparison of gene order in the mtDNAs of J. libera…” show “clusters that are otherwise not found in bacteria but that evidently appeared during evolution of the mitochondrial genome after the divergence of the proto-mitochondrion from the bacterial lineage. Examples are the clusters sdh3 to nad5, (comprising 5 genes), atp8-[trn]-rps4-atp9 and nad11-nad1-cox11-cox3-tufA.”

== Cultures ==
There are currently three strains of Jakoba libera available for culture. They can not be grown axenically, but are easily raised in minimal media with added bacteria (Klebsiella aerogenes)

== Similar genera ==
Jakobids (Jakobida or Jakobea)

- Histiona: 2-3 species
- Reclinomonas: 1 species

Malawimonas: 1 described species

Retortamonads:

- Retortamonas
- Chilomastix

Carpediemonas-like organisms:

- Carpediemonas
- Dysnectes
- Hicanonectes
- Ergobibamus
- Kipferlia
