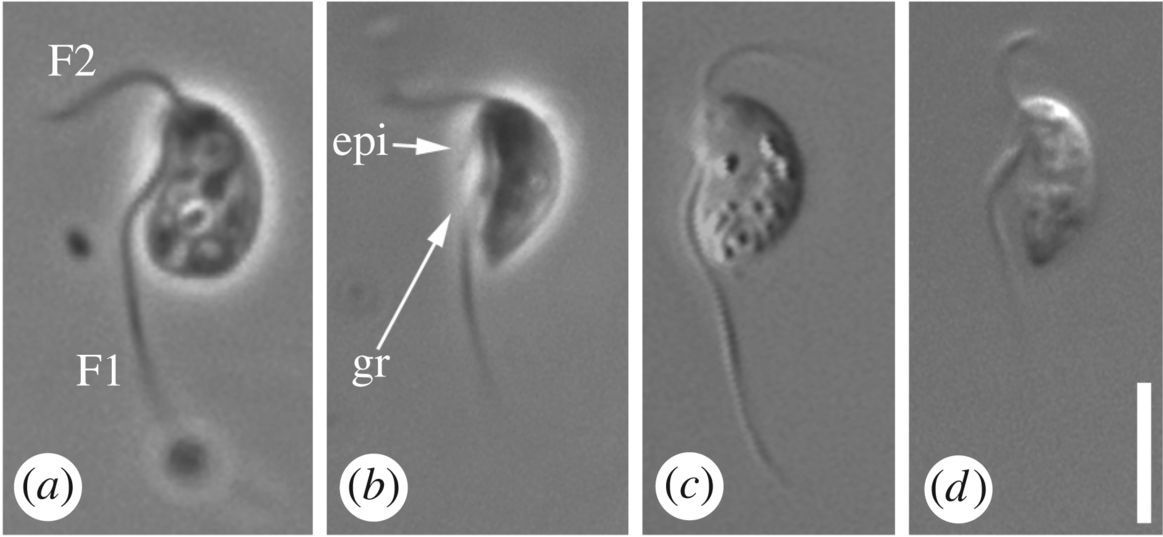
- Light microscopy image of the malawimonad Gefionella okellyi

Scientific classification
- Domain: Eukaryota
- Phylum: Malawimonada; Cavalier-Smith 2022
- Class: Malawimonadea; Cavalier-Smith 2013
- Order: Malawimonadida; Cavalier-Smith 2003

Families
- Imasidae; Malawimonadidae

Diversity
- 3 species

Synonyms
- Neolouka Cavalier-Smith 2013

= Malawimonad =

Malawimonads

Order of flagellates

Malawimonads (order Malawimonadida) are a small group of microorganisms with a basal position in the evolutionary tree of eukaryotes, containing only three recognized species. They are considered part of a paraphyletic group known as "Excavata".

== Evolution ==
It is clear that the malawimonads are a monophyletic clade at the base of Eukaryota, but there is no consensus on the specific relationships between other basal groups, such as Discoba, Metamonada, Ancyromonadida and Podiata. The sister group to Malawimonadida varies greatly between analyses. Some phylogenetic analyses find Malawimonadida as the sister group to Podiata. Other analyses recover Malawimonadida as the sister group of Discoba or Metamonada. Very few modern analyses recover the three clades, Malawimonadida, Discoba and Metamonada, as a monophyletic Excavata.

- Eukaryota
  - Diaphoretickes (plants, chromalveolates...)
  - - Discoba
      - Jakobea
      - - Tsukubea
        - - Euglenozoa
          - Heterolobosea
  - Metamonada
  - Malawimonadida
  - Ancyromonadida
  - - Podiata
      - CRuMs
      - Amorphea (amoebozoa, fungi, animals...)

== Taxonomy ==
=== History ===
The malawimonads were first described as order Malawimonadida in 2003 by Thomas Cavalier-Smith. In 2013 they were also described as a class (Malawimonadea) and were placed as the only member of the subphylum Neolouka as part of the phylum "Loukozoa", a polyphyletic group uniting Metamonada, Jakobea, Tsukubea and the malawimonads. Later, the Loukozoa broke apart and Neolouka was raised to the rank of phylum. Finally, this phylum containing only malawimonads was renamed in 2022 to Malawimonada by the same author.

=== Classification ===
Initially, Malawimonadida was a monotypic order, containing only the family Malawimonadidae and the genus Malawimonas. In 2018, the genus Gefionella was first described and added to this family. In 2020, a new genus Imasa and a new family Imasidae were added to the group. Presently, Malawimonadida contains 2 families, 3 genera and 3 accepted species.

- Family Imasidae Heiss, Simpson, & Kim 2020
  - Imasa Heiss, Simpson, & Kim 2020
    - I. heleensis Heiss, Simpson, & Kim 2020
- Family Malawimonadidae O'Kelly & Nerad 1999
  - Gefionella Heiss, Ekelund & Simpson 2018
    - G. okellyi Heiss, Ekelund & Simpson 2018
  - Malawimonas O'Kelly & Nerad 1999
    - M. jakobiformis O'Kelly & Nerad 1999
    - "M. californiana" or "californiensis" (nomen nudum)
