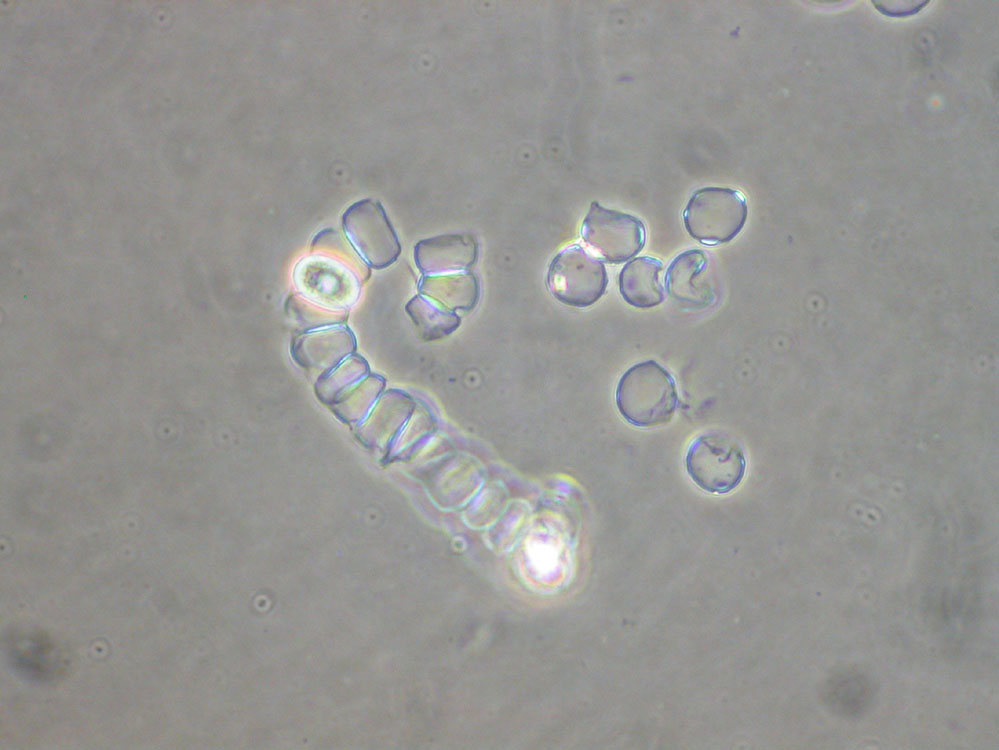
- The heterolobosean protozoa species Acrasis rosea Olive & Stoian

Scientific classification
- Domain: Eukaryota
- Clade: Discoba
- Superphylum: Discicristata

Phyla
- Euglenozoa; Percolozoa

Synonyms
- Discomitochondria Margulis & Schwartz 1998

= Discicristata =

Discicristata Temporal range: 1200–0 Ma

Taxonomic clade

Discicristata is a eukaryotic clade. It consists of Euglenozoa plus Percolozoa.

It was proposed that Discicristata plus Cercozoa yielded Cabozoa. Another proposal is to group Discicristata with Jakobida into Discoba superphylum.

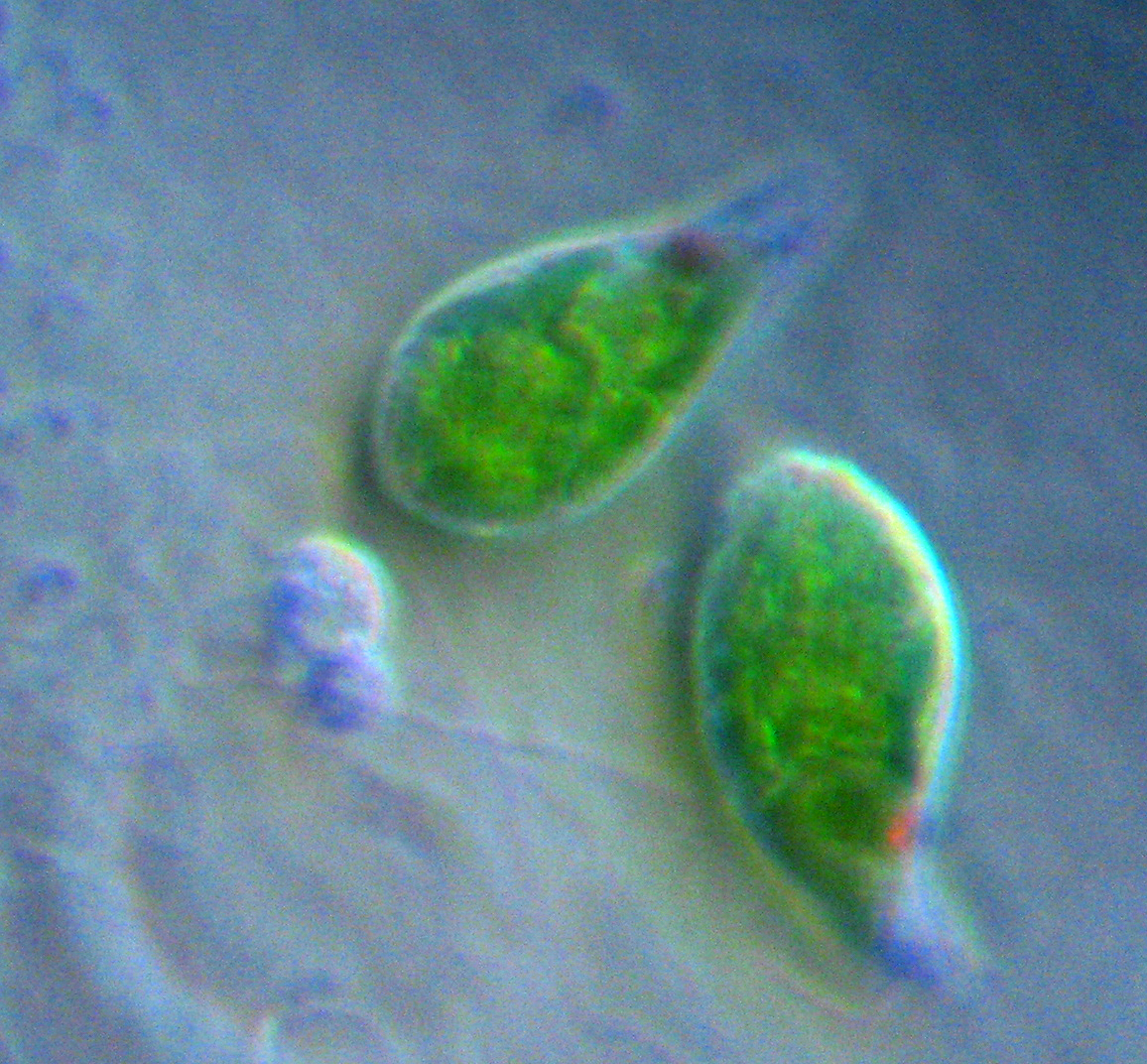
Two Euglena

== See also ==
- Excavata
