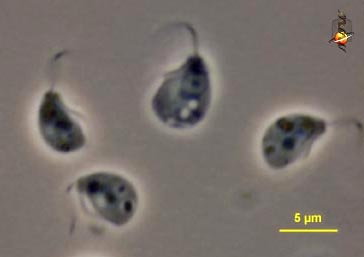
- Malawimonads

Scientific classification
- Domain: Eukaryota
- Clade: Discoba
- Phylum: Loukozoa; Cavalier-Smith, 1999

Subgroups
- Neolouka/Malawimonadea; Metamonada; Ancyromonadida?

= Loukozoa =

Proposed taxon

Loukozoa (From Greek loukos: groove) is a proposed taxon used in some classifications of eukaryotes, consisting of the Metamonada and Malawimonadea. Ancyromonads are closely related to this group, as sister of the entire group, or as sister of the Metamonada. Amorphea may have emerged in this grouping, specifically as sister of the malawimonads.

Originally, Loukozoa included Anaeromonadea and Jakobea. In 2013, it consisted of three subphyla: Eolouka (Tsukubea and Jakobea), Metamonada and Neolouka (Malawimonas). In 2018, Cavalier-Smith has removed Eolouka from Loukozoa, placing it instead in Discoba.

With the root of the Eukaryota likely close to or in Loukozoa or Discoba, these groupings are studied to give unique information on the first eukaryotes.
