= Histiona =

- Four jakobid species, showing groove and flagella: Jakoba libera (ventral view), Stygiella incarcerata (ventral view), Reclinomonas americana (dorsal view), and Histiona aroides (ventral view)

Scientific classification
- Domain: Eukaryota
- Clade: Discoba
- Class: Jakobea
- Order: Jakobida
- Family: Histionidae
- Genus: Histiona; Voigt 1902

Type species
- Histiona zachariasi Voigt 1902

Species
- Histiona aroides Pascher 1943; Histiona zachariasi Voigt 1902; Histiona velifera (Voigt 1901) Pascher 1943

Synonyms
- Zachariasia Voigt 1901 non Lemmermann 1895

Genus of eukaryotes

Histiona is a genus of Excavata containing four species. It has a worldwide distribution.

It is a Jakobid.
