= Pocheina rosea =

Scientific classification
- Domain: Eukaryota
- Clade: Discoba
- Phylum: Heterolobosea
- Order: Acrasida
- Family: Guttulinaceae
- Genus: Pocheina
- Species: P. rosea

Binomial name
- Pocheina rosea (Cienk.) A.R. Loebl. & Tappan, 1961

Synonyms
- Guttulina rosea Cienkowski, 1873

Species of amoeboid protist

Pocheina rosea is a species of amoeboid protist in the genus Pocheina, belonging to the order Acrasida. Originally described as Guttulina rosea by Cienkowski in 1873, the organism was reassigned to the genus Pocheina due to a preexisting use of the name Guttulina for a foraminiferan genus. P. rosea is recognized for its characteristic fruiting body morphology and is one of the two species known in its genus, the other being Pocheina flagellata.

== Morphology ==
The characteristics of Pocheina rosea are pinkish to reddish. This is where the species name, rosea, originates. The color appears due to the presence of intracellular pigments, but it was not specifically attributed to carotenoids in the reviewed studies. The fruiting body, sorocarp, of P. rosea consists of short stalk formed by a row of wedge-shaped cells, topped with a globose spore mass. The structure is distinct from that of Acrasis species, which typically form linear chains of spores. The amoebae move via eruptive pseudopodia and do not form flagellated cells, distinguishing P. rosea from P. flagellata, which does produce flagellates upon germination.

== Behavior ==
Pocheina rosea exhibits typical amoeboid behavior, including the ability to move by extending and retracting pseudopodia. Upon spore germination P. rosea releases non-flagellated, limax-shaped amoebae that exhibit eruptive locomotion. It feeds primarily by phagocytosis, engulfing bacteria, small fungi, and organic particles form the surrounding substrate. Pocheina attempts to establish cultures from germinated spores have generally failed, and excystment under laboratory conditions has not been observed. The amoebae do not appear to divide post-germination and typically enter a dormant cyst stage after a few days.

== Ecology ==
Pocheina rosea a thrives in moist, terrestrial environments where it is commonly found in decaying organic matter, particularly leaf litter and soil. This species is typically located in temperate forest ecosystems, where it contributes to the breakdown of plant material. Its presence is notably recorded in Western Australia, specifically within the bark of Santalum acuminatum.

== Taxonomic history ==
The species Pocheina rosea was first described as Guttulina rosea by the Polish botanist Cienkowski in 1873. This was based on specimens found on dead lichenized wood in Russia. Originally classified under a different genus before being reclassified by Löblich and Tappan in 1961 due to morphological differences of nomenclature conflict. While previous molecular analyses questioned the validity of Pocheinana as a separate genus due to a possibility of misidentification with Acrasis rosea due to contamination, subsequent research using SSU and ITS rRNA gene sequences from verified isolates has established Pocheina as a distinct, monophyletic genus separate from Acrasisis.
