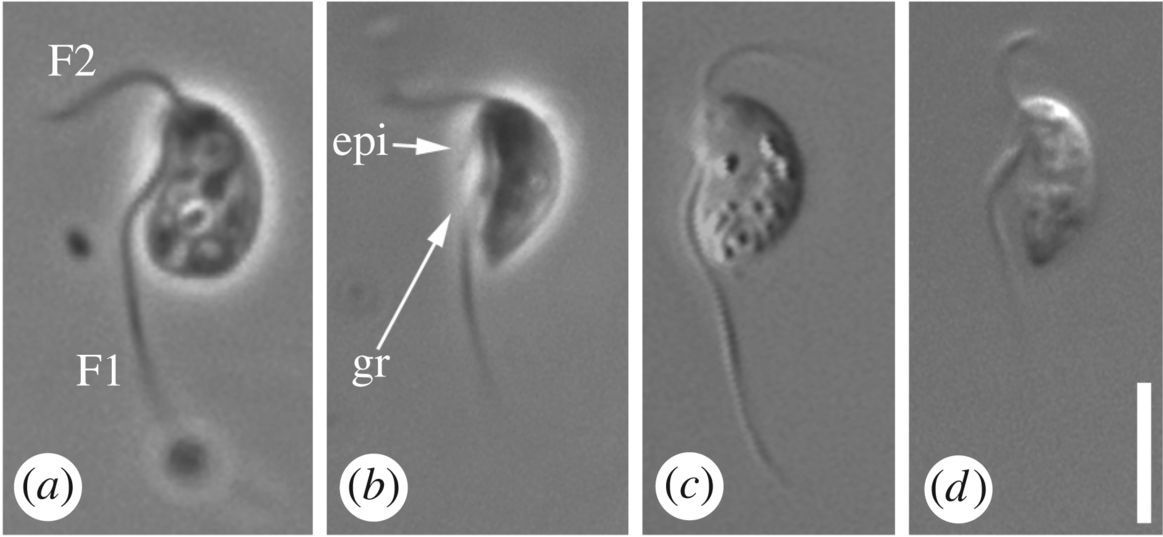
- Gefionella okellyi light microscopy

Scientific classification
- Domain: Eukaryota
- Phylum: Malawimonada
- Class: Malawimonadea
- Order: Malawimonadida
- Family: Malawimonadidae
- Genus: Gefionella
- Species: G. okellyi

Binomial name
- Gefionella okellyi Heiss, Ekelund & Simpson 2018

= Gefionella =

Genus of protists

Gefionella is a genus of excavate protists belonging to the family Malawimonadidae, a basal group in the evolution of eukaryotes. It is a monotypic genus, with only the species Gefionella okellyi, described in 2018. The genus is named after the Norse goddess Gefjon, while the species is named after the scientist Charles J. O'Kelly, a pioneer in the ultrastructural and phylogenetic investigation of excavate flagellates.
