= Andalucina =

Scientific classification
- Domain: Eukaryota
- Clade: Discoba
- Class: Jakobea
- Order: Jakobida
- Suborder: Andalucina; Cavalier-Smith 2013

Families
- Andaluciidae; Stygiellidae

Suborder of Jakobids

Andalucina is a suborder of unicellular organisms in the order of Jakobida. Many species in Andalucina inhabit anaerobic environments.
