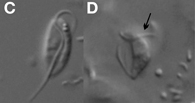
- Andalucia incarcerata

Scientific classification
- Domain: Eukaryota
- Clade: Discoba
- Class: Jakobea
- Order: Jakobida
- Family: Stygiellidae
- Genus: Stygiella
- Species: S. incarcerata

Binomial name
- Stygiella incarcerata Bernard, Simpson and Patterson 2000) Pánek, Tábosky and Čepička 2015

Synonyms
- Jakoba incarcerata Bernard, Simpson & Patterson 2000; Andalucia incarcerata (Bernard, Simpson & Patterson 2000) Lara et al. 2006

= Stygiella incarcerata =

Species of marine flagellate

Stygiella incarcerata is a species of Excavata.

== Taxonomy ==
Stygiella incarcerata was originally described to the genus Jakoba in 2000, but was moved to the newly created genus Andalucia in 2006. It was transferred again to the new genus Stygiella in 2015.
