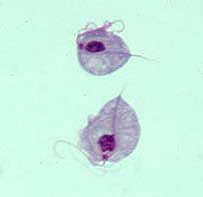
- Trichomonas giemsa, Parabasalia

Scientific classification
- Domain: Eukaryota
- Clade: Metamonada
- Subphylum: Trichozoa

Superclasses
- Parabasalia; Carpediemonadia; Eopharyngia

= Trichozoa =

Proposed subphylum of excavates

Trichozoa is a proposed group of excavates.

"Fornicata" is a similar grouping, but it excludes Parabasalia.

"Eopharyngia" is an even more narrow grouping, including Retortamonadida and Diplomonadida but not Carpediemonas.
