= Histionidae =

Scientific classification
- Domain: Eukaryota
- Clade: Discoba
- Class: Jakobea
- Order: Jakobida
- Family: Histionidae; Flavin & Nerad, 1993

Genera
- Histiona; Reclinomonas; Stomatochone

Family of protists

Histionidae is a family of Jakobids in the paraphyletic Excavata group.
