= Stygiella =

Scientific classification
- Domain: Eukaryota
- Clade: Discoba
- Class: Jakobea
- Order: Jakobida
- Family: Stygiellidae
- Genus: Stygiella; Pánek, Táborský & Čepička 2015.

Type species
- Stygiella incarcerata (Bernard, Simpson and Patterson 2000) Pánek, Tábosky & Čepička 2015

Species
- S. adhaerens; S. agilis; S. cryptica; S. incarcerata

Genus of marine flagellates

Stygiella /ˌstɪ.d͡ʒiˈɛ.lə/ is a genus of free-living marine flagellates belonging to the family Stygiellidae in the Jakobids (excavata).

The genus currently includes four species, all of which are secondary obligate anaerobes. The species are all unicellular and crescent-shaped. All members possess hydrogenosomes, a type of acristate mitochondrion-derived organelle (MRO) that produces hydrogen gas as a metabolic product. Stygiella is a deep-branching lineage within excavates, and hydrogenosome genes sometimes show eubacterium-like mechanisms that have been useful for studying of the evolutionary history of eukaryotic mitochondria.

== Etymology ==
Stygiella is a newly coined diminutive based on the name of the Greek goddess of the river Styx, which in Greek mythology formed the boundary between the Earth and the Underworld.

== History ==
The species Stygiella incarcerata was first described by Bernard et al. in 2000, sampled from Quirbray Bay, Australia and Nivå Bay, Denmark; but the species may have been previously seen by Fentel et al. in 1995 at Danish fjord. The species was originally classified in the genus Jakoba, with the name Jakoba incarcerata. Later 18S rRNA analysis by Lara et al. showed strong phylogenetic relationship between J. incarcerata and Andalucia godoyi, a newly described biflagellated Jakobid from soil; the researchers therefore moved the species under the novel genus Andalucia in 2006.

In 2015, Pánek et al. analyzed anaerobic Jakobid lineages by SSU DNA and six protein coding genes. The results indicate strong clade for all anaerobic Jakobids, forming the novel family Stygiellidae with two novel genera: Velundella and Stygiella; A. incarcerata was thus classified in Stygiella, along with three newly discovered species.

== Habitat ==
All Stygiella species have been found in anoxic, sulfide- and ammonium rich sediment in the ocean bed or in brackish water. Stygiella species tolerate salinity between 19 and 56 ppt. All four species have been successfully cultured in laboratory conditions at room temperature.

== Morphology ==
All Stygiella species have a similar morphology: they are laterally crescent-shaped or ovoidal, aloricate cells with pointed ends (S. incarcerata), and a diamond-shaped ventral groove covers most of the ventral side to the posterior end. There are two distinct types of body shapes present in every species: grooved cells with broadly open grooves, and swimming cells with shortened, narrower grooves. The bodies of swimming cells usually narrow from middle to the end, whereas the grooved cells are more ovoid. Reported cell lengths usually range from 6.0 to 9.0 μm

The cells are biflagellated, with flagella originating close to the anterior end of the groove and extending towards the anterior and the posterior ends of the cell. The anterior flagella are usually shorter than the body length while the posterior flagella are usually more than twice longer than the cell; the posterior flagella of S. incarcerata are generally shorter, usually about 1.5 times the cell length.

The anterior flagellum of S. incarcerata has single root made of two slightly separated microtubules, which originates close to the anterior basal body in the ventral, posterior end. The posterior flagellum has two main microtubular roots: the left one is associated with three different non-microtubular fibres as well as a composite fibre, and the right one of one type. In addition, a singlet “root” circles the posterior basal body and supports the shape of the groove.

A dorsal vane attaches on the posterior flagellum, which is supported by a paraxonemal lamella that originates near the axoneme. The axoneme is composed of the typical eukaryotic 9 x 2 motif. The lamella raises against the axoneme and connects to at least two axonemal doublets after approximately 100 nm apart from the axoneme. Its width gradually broadens to about 700 nm.

Stygiella species mostly have a pear-shaped or sometimes a rounded nucleus close to the anterior end of the cell, with a nucleolus of 0.5 μm diameter. A single Golgi dictyosome, with generally 3 to 8 cisternae is located immediately posterior of the basal bodies. The cytoskeleton resembles that of other excavates. The concentration of ribosomes is very low in the cytosol.

All species in Stygiella possess acristate hydrogenosomes that can only perform anaerobic ATP-synthesis and lost most of its proteins for the electron transport chains. These hydrogenosomes, generally 300 to 500 nm across and 0.75 to 1 μm in length, lie close to the nucleus and often associate with major flagellar microtubular roots.

== Behaviour ==
The cells may attach to the substrate by their flagella (mostly the anterior flagellum) or by the lateral or the dorsal cell body through a posterior cytoplasmic projection. The major morphotypes in S. incarcerata and S. agilis are swimming cells that move in a spiralling motion with only occasion adherence to substrate. Grooved morphotypes of these species attach to the substrate first by the anterior flagellum, which drags the body towards the substrate and releases when the posterior cytoplasmic projection adheres. S. adhaerens and S. cryptica are majorly grooved cells that nearly always attach to the substrate by the anterior, or seldom the posterior flagellum; few swimming cells have been observed in these species.

== Metabolism ==
The hydrogenosomes of Stygiella seem to lack an organellar genome and the majority of the Complex I subunits for an electron transfer chain but contain proteins for eubacterium-like pyruvate decarboxylation, such as pyruvate:ferredoxin oxidoreductase and [FeFe]-hydrogenase, which also exist in other anaerobic excavates of different lineages. This convergent evolution may be the result of similar lateral gene transfer.

Compared to some parasitic anaerobic excavates, such as Trichomonas vaginalis, the hydrogenosomes of S. incarcerata retain more import proteins and more functional amino acid mechanism. In addition, it has an oxidative stress response similar to that of other anaerobic protists. Iron-sulfur cluster assemblies are present in the hydrogenosomes, which is consistent with all other mitochondrion-derived organelles.

== List of species ==
Four species of Stygiella are recognized:

- Stygiella incarcerata (Bernard, Simpson and Patterson 2000) Pánek, Tábosky and Čepička 2015.
- Stygiella adhaerens Pánek, Táborský & Čepička 2015
- Stygiella cryptica Pánek, Táborský & Čepička 2015
- Stygiella agilis Pánek, Táborský & Čepička 2015
