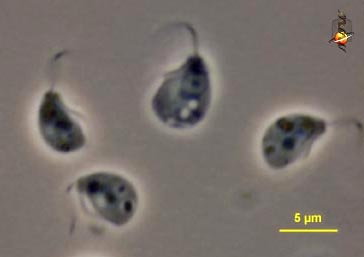

Scientific classification
- Domain: Eukaryota
- Phylum: Malawimonada
- Class: Malawimonadea
- Order: Malawimonadida
- Family: Malawimonadidae
- Genus: Malawimonas; O’Kelly & Nerad 1999

Type species
- Malawimonas jakobiformis O’Kelly & Nerad 1999

Species
- M. californiana; M. jakobiformis

= Malawimonas =

Genus of micro-organisms

Malawimonas is a genus of unicellular, heterotrophic flagellates with uncertain phylogenetic affinities. They have variably been assigned to Excavata and Loukozoa. Recent studies suggest they may be closely related to the Podiata.

== Discovery history ==
In 1993, Charles J. O’ Kelly studied the jakobid group of flagellates and their implications for the early diversification of eukaryotes. He recognized that Jakoba, Reclimonas, and Histonia, often referred to as “core jakobids” were morphologically somewhat similar. Interestingly, they included an unnamed and undescribed free-swimming, flagellate, and also groove-bearing cell.

During the initial study, these cells were thought to be members of Jakoba due to external morphological features that resemble Jakoba libera, such as the lack of a cell covering, sessile trophic stages, swimming in a similar manner, and sharing the tendency for the anterior flagellum to form a “crook". However, later discovery found that this species seemed to not fit and could not be assigned to the genus Jakoba, nor to any other genus of Jakobids, because of their discoidal mitochondrial cristae, which is different from Jakoba that have irregularly flattened, and the other Jakobid members have tubular mitochondrial cristae.

This undescribed organism was later described formally as Malawimonas jakobiformis and placed in its own new family Malawimonadidae. It is a bacterivorous heterotrophic isolated from the Malawi shore of Lake Nyasa (eastern Africa).

Over a decade later, a related organism has been investigated under several studies that revolved around the phylogenetic positions of the jakobids and cercozoans group under the names Malawimonas californiana, but there were no formal descriptions included.

== Characterization ==
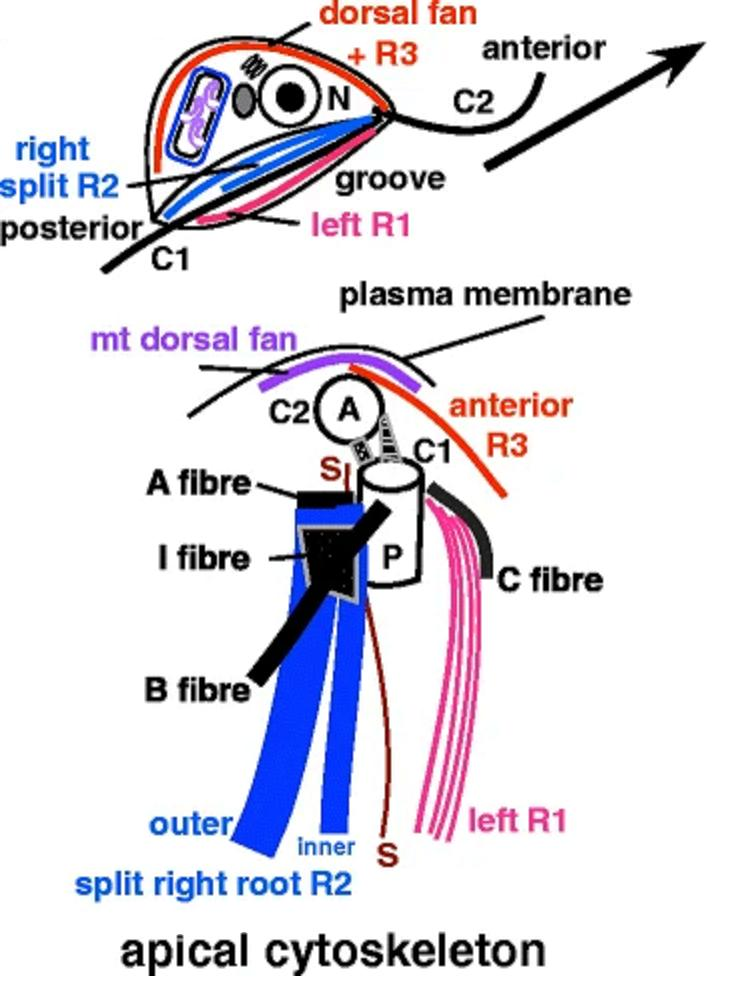
Malawimonas, schematic diagram

Malawimonas share some common features with the jakobids and other Excavata group members, such as having a conspicuous feeding grove on the ventral side and two flagellates. The overall cytoskeleton of Malawimonas resembles Carpediemonas, typical Excavata belonging to the anaerobic Metamonada clade and closely related to diplomonads and retortamonads.

Malawimonas jakobiformis is characterized by a uninucleate, biflagellate, heterotrophic, “naked” cell, where neither scales nor lorica is present. Observation of the ultrastructure revealed a substantial glycocalyx as a surface coat. The cells of Malawimonas are usually slender, with a plastic shape often deformed by influences such as coverslip pressure or ingested food. The two flagella are approximately 1-1.5 times as long as the cell body and are more or less equal in length. The anterior flagellum has a “crook” shape, while the posterior flagellum is appressed but not attached to the ventral cell surface. Cells swim in straight lines and rotate along their longitudinal axes as they move. The posterior flagellar vane of Malawimonas jakobiformis arises from a clearly defined point on the ventral surface of the flagellum. In contrast, other jakobids' vanes have a diffuse origin along the dorsal surface.

== Malawimonas, jakobids, and mitochondrial origin ==
The early study of molecular investigations revealed that the genome of Reclinomonas americana, Jakoba libera and Malawimonas jakobiformis collectively represent the most eubacterial-like mitochondrial DNAs yet discovered among all eukaryotes. Jakobids have all the basic forms of mitochondrial cristae known in eukaryotes. The mitochondrial shape has been seen as a strongly conserved character and is used to delimit the deepest evolutionary division within eukaryotes.

== Position within Eukaryota ==
A study based on alpha- and beta-tubulin phylogenies found that Malawimonas jakobiformis occupies a relatively basal position in the plant-protists superclade and is distinct from the “core jakobids”.

Molecular phylogenies have not resolved the position of malawimonads within eukaryotes. Analyses of a small number of nucleus-encoded genes often place malawimonads as close relatives of metamonads. Since 2016, most phylogenomic studies have placed malawimonads separately from other excavates. Phylogenetic analyses of SSU rDNA, tubulins, and 5–7 nucleus-encoded proteins suggest that malawimonads are not specifically related to jakobids. The similarities between jakobids and malawimonads apparently reflect the ancestral morphology of excavate protists, or perhaps convergence, and not a close phylogenetic relationship.
