= Reclinomonas =

- Four jakobid species, showing groove and flagella: Jakoba libera (ventral view), Stygiella incarcerata (ventral view), Reclinomonas americana (dorsal view), and Histiona aroides (ventral view)

Scientific classification
- Domain: Eukaryota
- (unranked): incertae sedis
- Clade: Discoba
- Class: Jakobea
- Order: Jakobida
- Family: Histionidae
- Genus: Reclinomonas; Flavin & Nerad, 1993

Type species
- Reclinomonas americana Flavin & Nerad 1993

Species
- R. americana; R. campanula

Genus of basal eukaryotes

Reclinomonas is a monotypic genus of jakobid eukaryote containing the single species Reclinomonas americana.

This organism is a single cell up to 12 micrometers wide. It has two flagella. The cell is in a cup-like lorica which has a stem that attaches to a surface. When the cell reproduces, by undergoing binary fission, one of the two newly split cells produces a new lorica for itself.

This protozoan can be found in freshwater.

This species was the first jakobid to have its mitochondrial genome sequenced. It contains 97 genes, 62 of them code for proteins. Other jakobids have been sequenced since, and the data were similar. It has been described as a member of the Excavata.

R. americana is a large protozoan that ingests bacteria. Such phagocytosis is thought to be how ancestral (two billion years ago) eucaryotes (true nucleus to hold DNA) acquired mitochondrial and chloroplast organelles to perform oxidative metabolism and photosynthesis. R. americana has played a significant role in understanding the scope of antiquity of what bacterial DNA was captured because its mitochondrial DNA collection is more complete than that of other eukaryotes, which have discarded many and various genes.

== Species ==
- R. americana Flavin & Nerad 1993
- R. campanula (Penard 1921) Flavin & Nerad 1993
