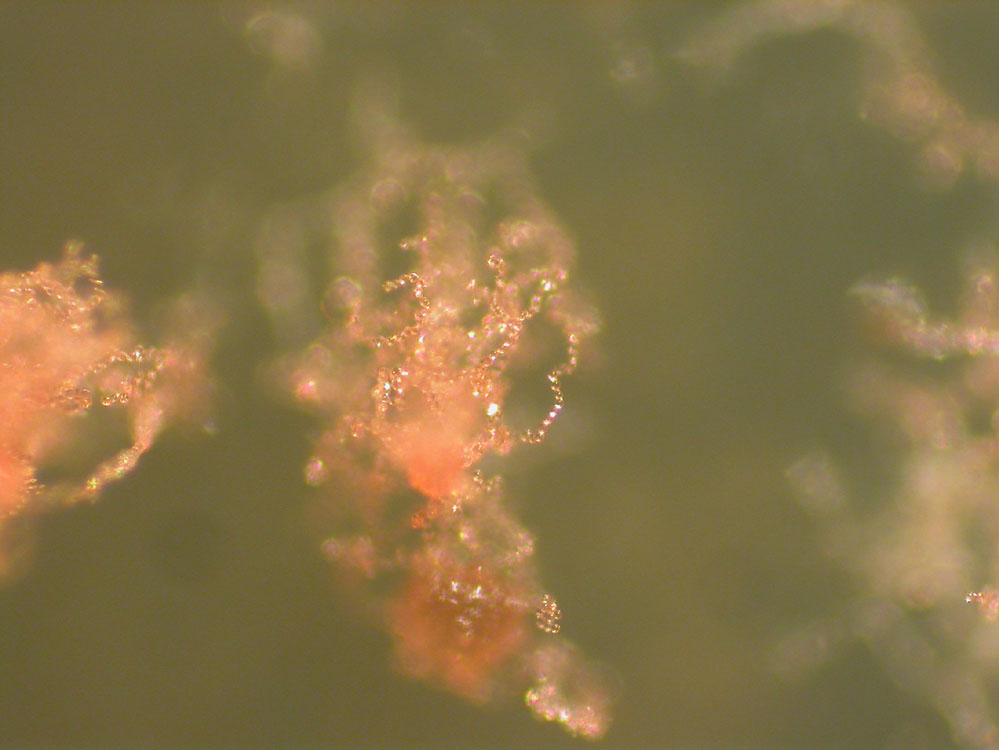
- Acrasis rosea

Scientific classification
- Domain: Eukaryota
- Clade: Discoba
- Phylum: Heterolobosea
- Order: Acrasida
- Family: Acrasidae van Tieghem 1880 ex Hartog 1906

Genera
- Acrasis van Tieghem 1880; Allovahlkampfia Walochnik & Mulec, 2009; Pocheina Loeblich & Tappan 1961

Synonyms
- Acrasiaceae Poche 1913 em. Olive 1970; Guttulinaceae Zopf 1885 ex Berlese 1888 nom. rej.; Guttulininae Doflein & Reichenow 1952; Pocheinaceae Loeblich & Tappan 1961 nom. cons.

= Acrasidae =

Family of slime moulds

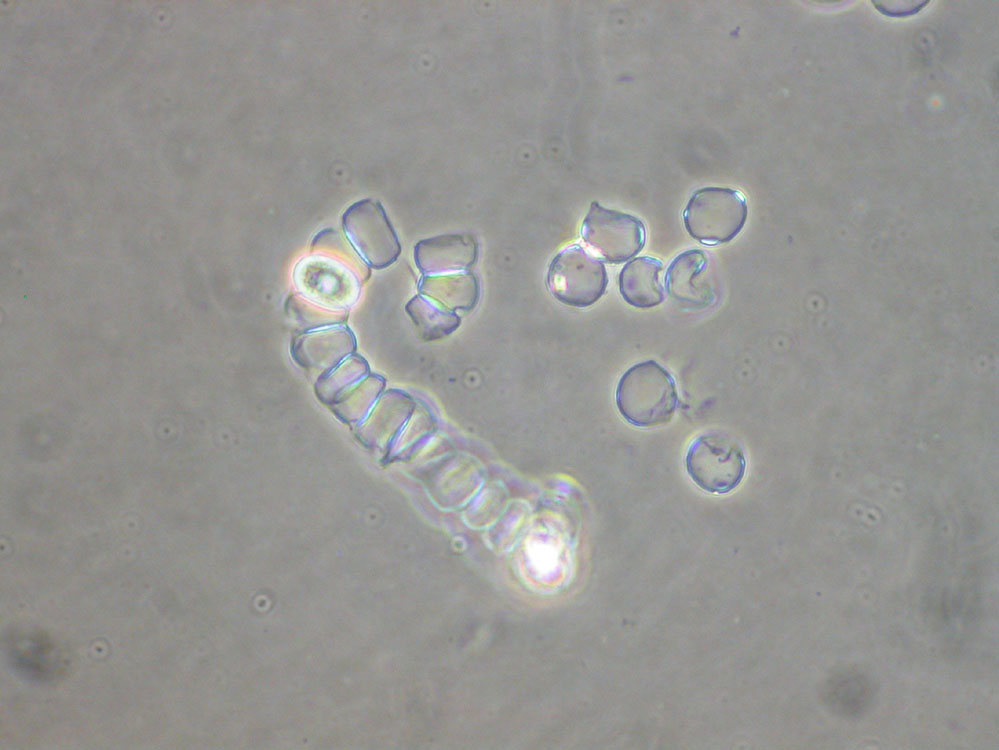
Acrasis rosea amoebae and spores under microscope

The family Acrasidae (ICZN, or Acrasiomycota, ICBN) is a family of slime molds which belongs to the excavate group Heterolobosea. The name element acrasio- comes from the Greek akrasia, meaning "acting against one's judgement". This group consists of cellular slime molds.

The terms "Acrasiomycota" or "Acrasiomycetes" have been used when the group was classified as a fungus ("-mycota"). In some classifications, Dictyostelium was placed in Acrasiomycetes, an artificial group of cellular slime molds, which was characterized by the aggregation of individual amoebae into a multicellular fruiting body, making it an important factor that related the acrasids to the dictyostelids.

Each cell keeps its individuality even when it forms a stalk and fruiting body to reproduce. Slime molds were originally thought to be in a monophyletic group Mycetozoa, with little distinction between Acrasis and Dictyostelids, however scientists uncovered that they were distinct groups, and eventually that Acrasis was incredibly distant on the tree of life. Instead, it is found in Heterolobosia with Naegleria, away from other myxamoeba.

== Ecology ==
Acrasis is found in terrestrial habitats on dead or decaying bark or dead tissue still attached to plants. They are often cultured using yeast which makes up most of their diet, but they are known to participate in cannibalism in their solitary mobile stage of life. They may also be found on living tree bark.

== Evolutionary history ==
Historically it was thought that Acrasis was a sister group to dictyostelids, other slime mold amoebas that belong to Amoebozoa, due to how they both aggregate in order to form a fruiting body. However, in their amoeboid form it was realized they were fundamentally different and molecular phylogenetic studies placed Acrasis in Heterolobosea alongside the infamous Naegleria One particular morphological difference between Acrasis and dictyostelids is that the stalks of the fruiting body in Acrasis are trunk-like and do not contain a cellulose sheath.

Heterolobosea belong within Discoba. Out of all discobids, Acrasis has the most compact mitochondrial genome that requires additional transport activity due to the number of genes lost. tRNA genes, which are commonly found in most mitochondria sequences, are scarce in Acrasis and require transportation in for the translation of the remaining mitochondrial genes. The reason for this gene deficiency is because of gene transfer from the mitochondria to the nucleus. This transfer of tRNA genes occurred recently in the Acrasis lineage, as sequence comparisons indicate gene transfer after Acrasis split with Naegleria.

== Reproduction ==
When resources such as water or food become limiting, the amoeba will release pheromones such as acrasin to aggregate amoebal cells in preparation for movement as a large (thousands of cells) grex or pseudopod. When in the grex, the amoeboids reproduce, resulting in fruit-like structures called spores, which develop into unicellular molds of the same species.

Its reproductive cycle can be broken up to three distinct life stages where the Acrasis cell experiences morphological and intracellular changes [2].

=== Vegetative/solitary stage ===
After Acrasis spores are released, they germinate into free living limax amoebae, where they use a single pseudopodium to move forward, reaching to become up to 32 micrometers long. During this stage they may experience conditions of starvation or dehydration where they differentiate into a microcyst that has an extracellular cell wall. This microcyst can then differentiate back into the limax amoebae form. Alternatively, if conditions are favorable, a stimulus can signal the amoebae to aggregate together.

=== Pseudoplasmodial stage ===
Upon stimulation they begin to aggregate into the “slug” that will eventually begin to form a mound with others of the same species. Each cell keeps its individuality and only minor intracellular alterations are seen. One of the alterations seen in the cells between the vegetative and pseudoplasmodial stage is the decrease in number and volume of food vacuoles.

=== Differentiated stage ===
Within the mound one amoeba differentiates into a stalk cell that the others rest atop of, creating a structure called the sorogen. After the stalk grows from repeated cell differentiation into basal stalk cells, select cells form distal spore cells and the sporocarp structure from which they are released. This forms the fruiting body that overall has great plasticity through the ability to branch. Throughout this process from the solitary stage to the formation of the fruiting body, each cell maintains its individuality. Following the formation of the fruiting body, spores are released, and the cycle begins anew.

== See also ==
- Pocheina rosea
