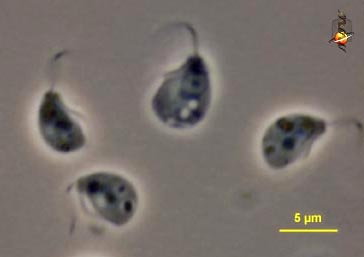
- Malawimonas jakobiformis

Scientific classification
- Domain: Eukaryota
- Phylum: Malawimonada
- Class: Malawimonadea
- Order: Malawimonadida
- Family: Malawimonadidae; O'Kelly & Nerad 1999

Genera
- Gefionella; Malawimonas

= Malawimonadidae =

Family of protists

Malawimonadidae is a family of unicellular eukaryotes of outsize importance in understanding eukaryote phylogeny.

Malawimonadidae is a unique and relatively lesser-known group of flagellate protists belonging to the phylum Malawimonada. These organisms are single-celled eukaryotes that are found in various aquatic habitats, including freshwater environments and marine systems.

Several features make Malawimonadidae unique:

Evolutionary position: Malawimonads are considered to be one of the earliest branching lineages of eukaryotes. This makes them particularly interesting for researchers studying the early evolution of eukaryotic cells and their organelles.

Feeding mechanism: Malawimonads are known to be bacterivorous, meaning they feed on bacteria. They possess a unique feeding apparatus called the "malawimonad mastigont system," which is a complex of microtubules, flagella, and other cellular structures that facilitate the capture and ingestion of bacteria.

Flagella arrangement: Malawimonad cells typically have two flagella that are inserted close to each other. One flagellum is directed towards the anterior part of the cell, while the other is directed posteriorly. This flagellar arrangement is unique among protists and is used for both locomotion and feeding.

Mitochondrial relics: The mitochondria in Malawimonadidae are unusual in that they have reduced, highly derived cristae.

== Phylogeny ==
- Scotokaryota
  - Metamonada Cavalier-Smith 1987 emend. Cavalier-Smith 2003
  - Opimoda
    - Ancyromonadida Cavalier-Smith 1998 emend. Atkins 2000
    - - Malawimonadea Cavalier-Smith 2003
      - - Amorphea
          - Amoebozoa Lühe 1913 emend. Cavalier-Smith 1998
          - Obazoa
            - Breviatea Cavalier-Smith 2004
            - - Apusomonadida Karpov & Mylnikov 1989
              - Opisthokonta
        - CRuMs
          - Mantamonadida Cavalier-Smith 2004
          - - Rigifilida Karpov & Mylnikov 1989
            - Diphylleida Cavalier-Smith 1993
