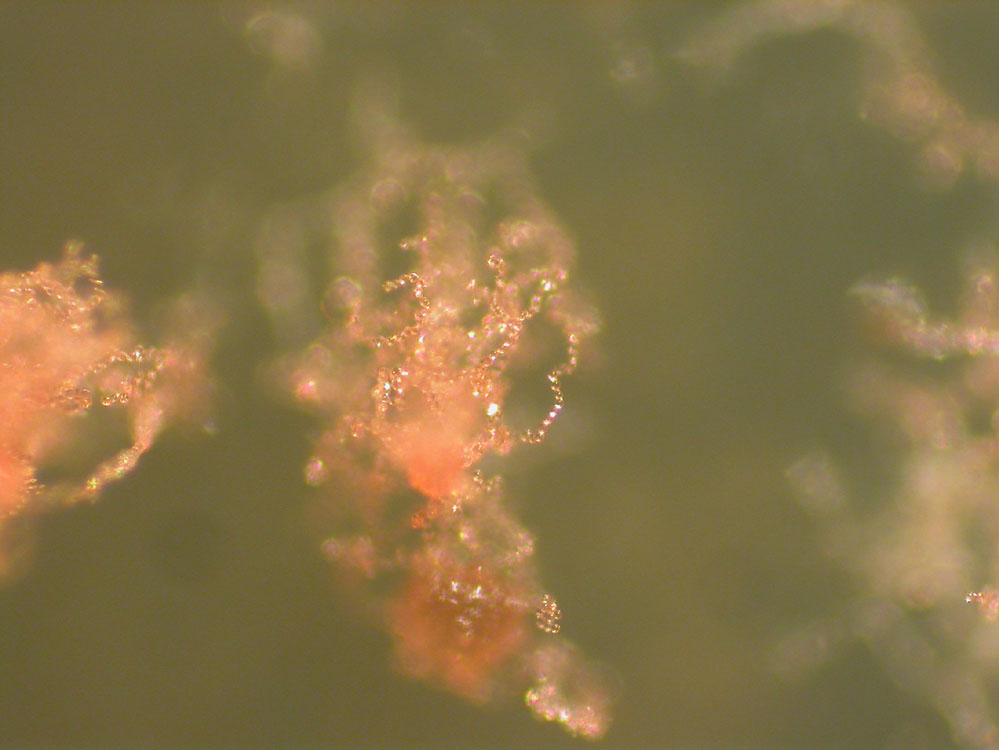

Scientific classification
- Domain: Eukaryota
- Clade: Discoba
- Phylum: Heterolobosea
- Order: Acrasida
- Family: Acrasidae
- Genus: Acrasis
- Species: A. rosea

Binomial name
- Acrasis rosea L.S. Olive & Stoianovic

= Acrasis rosea =

Species of slime mold

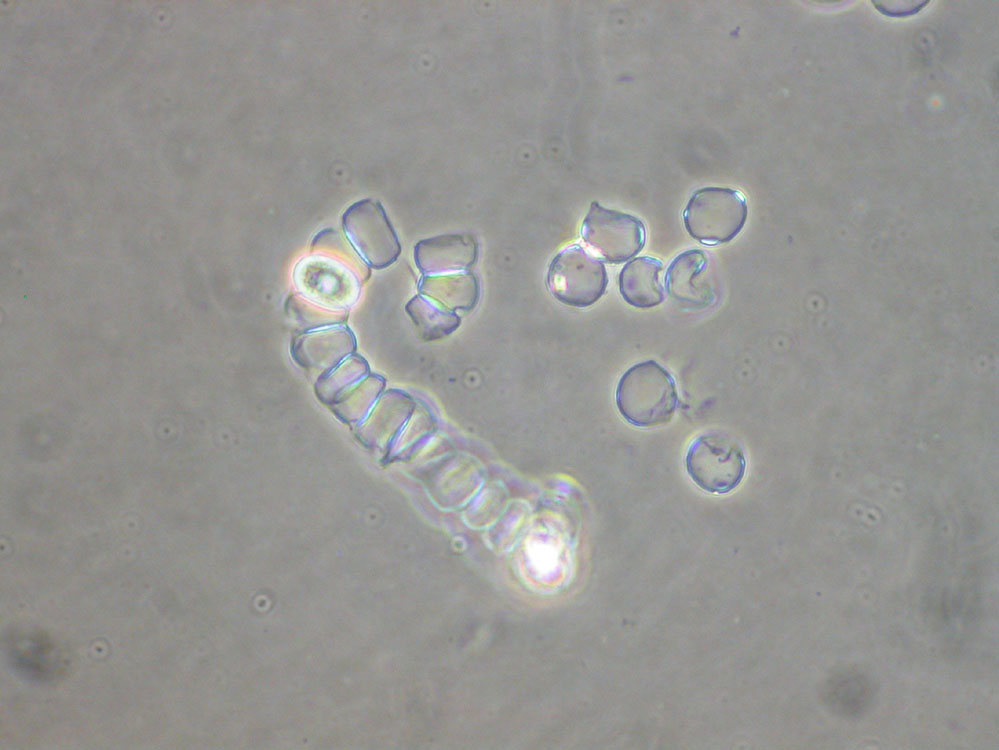
Amoebae emerging from spores

Acrasis rosea is a species of slime mold within the heterolobosea.
