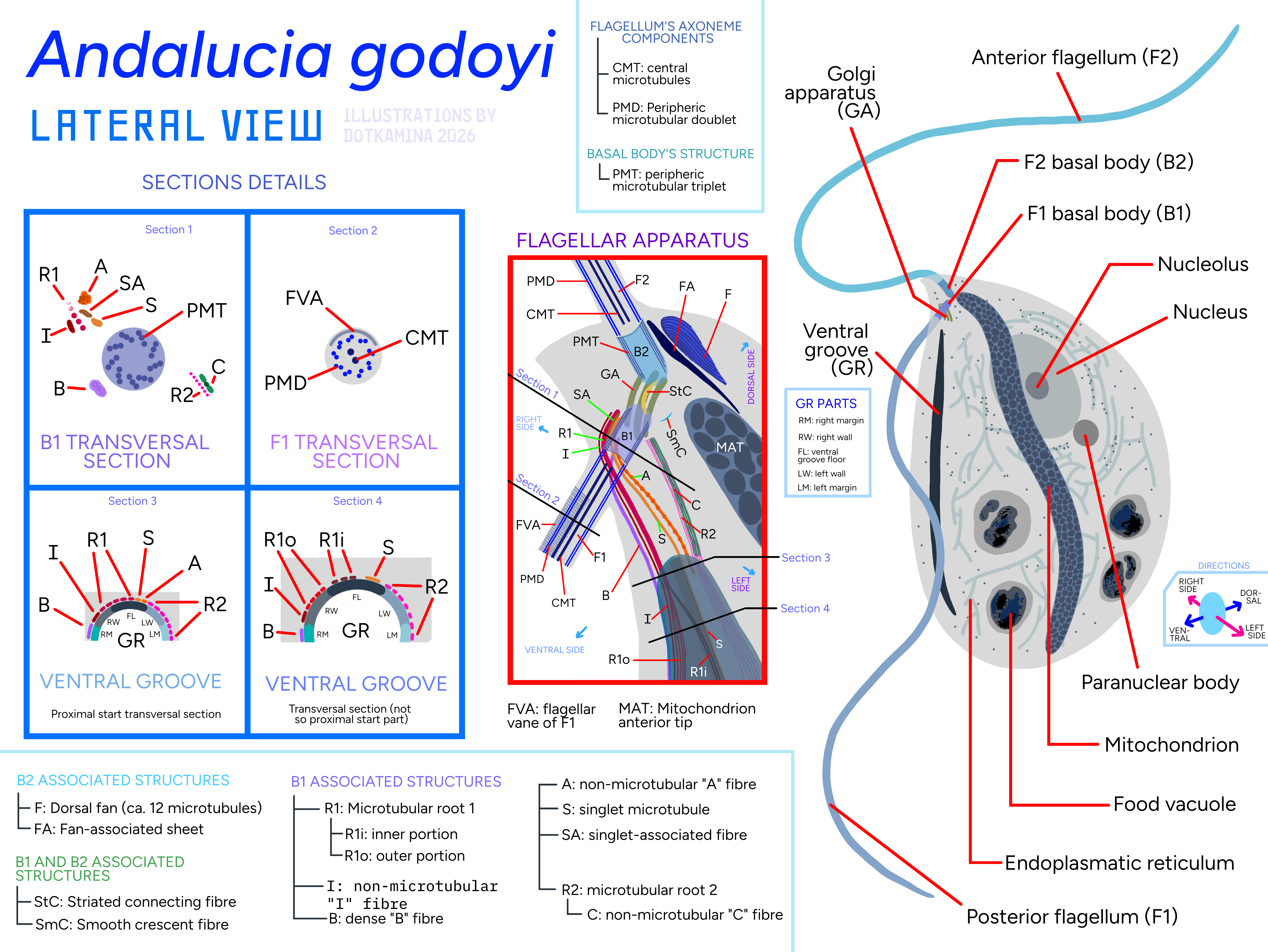

Scientific classification
- Domain: Eukaryota
- Clade: Discoba
- Class: Jakobea
- Order: Jakobida
- Suborder: Andalucina
- Family: Andaluciidae; Cavalier-Smith 2013
- Genus: Andalucia; Lara et al. 2006
- Species: A. godoyi

Binomial name
- Andalucia godoyi Lara et al. 2006

= Andalucia godoyi =

Genus of jakobids

Andalucia is a genus of jakobids, currently containing the sole species Andalucia godoyi. It has a worldwide distribution.

== Classification ==
The morphology of Andalucia broadly resembles that of other jakobids. Molecular data has not always been conclusive, but recent phylogenomic analyses indicate that Andalucia is a sister group to the other jakobids, or, in other words, more closely related to them than to the Heterolobosea or Euglenozoa (the other two groups in the Discoba). The α-tubulin gene of Andalucia more closely resembles that of opisthokonts and diplomonads than its closer relatives, the apparent result of horizontal gene transfer.

As of 2015, the soil heterotroph Andalucia godoyi is the only described species in the genus. The species Andalucia incarcerata, living in sulfide-rich marine intertidal sediments, was transferred to the genus Stygiella in 2015.

Analysis of DNA sequences from the environment suggests at least two additional species that have not been isolated or formally described.
