= Tsukubamonas =

Scientific classification
- Domain: Eukaryota
- Supergroup: Discoba
- Class: Tsukubea; Cavalier-Smith 2012
- Order: Tsukubamonadida; Yabuki et al. 2011
- Family: Tsukubamonadidae; Yabuki et al. 2011
- Genus: Tsukubamonas; Yabuki et al. 2011
- Species: T. globosa

Binomial name
- Tsukubamonas globosa Yabuki et al. 2011

Genus of excavates

Tsukubamonas globosa

Tsukubamonas is a unicellular heterotrophic, biflagellated excavate of the Discoba clade (along with jakobids, euglenozoans and percolozoans) with only one species known, Tsukubamonas globosa. It inhabits fresh-water, feeds on bacteria, and can exist as a vegetative cell or cyst. The cells are characterised with a spherical or semi-spherical shape, are highly vacuolated with thin subsurface vesicles and the absence of a contractile vacuole, tubular cristae in its mitochondria, and two flagella of an apparatus with five main structures (four basal bodies, three major microtubule roots, four major fibres, one microtubule organization center, and several internal microtubules). Tsukubamonas is notable for having a backwards right root, a differentiation of its anterior root orientation, and for having a lack of a left root. Other notable differences are in the morphology of its singlet root and associated fibre, the lack of flagella vanes, and in its cytoskeletal structure. The research has currently acknowledged its placement within the Discoba clade as its own individual group, with its mitochondrial genome to be around 48,643 base pairs long.

== Etymology ==
“Tsukuba” is derived from the geographical location of the University of Tsukuba, Japan, where the organism was found. “Monas” is a suffix commonly used to describe single-celled organisms within taxonomic ranks, originating from Ancient Greek word "μονάς" (monás), meaning "unit" or "single".

== History of knowledge ==
The genus was first discovered in Hyotaro Pond at the University of Tsukuba, Japan in October, 2002. Providing a general idea of its phylogenetic position, they determined the genus to be categorized within the supergroup, Excavata, due to the presence of a ventral feeding groove. However, with a number of differing characteristics from the supergroup, they further used SSU rDNA phylogeny analysis to determine the precise positioning. Although this method provided no results of statistical significance, a multigene phylogeny analysis using 5 protein datasets was able to place the group ambiguously under the Discoba clade along with jakobids, euglenozoans, and heteroloboseans. The novelty of the morphological features provided led to the classification of its own new taxa, the Tsukubamonadidae n. fam. and Tsukubamonadida n. ord. Tsukubamonas globosa is currently the only species in the genus. Since the initial collection from Hyoutaropond, T. globosa has never been found again. An established strain has been created and maintained through a small aliquot of water sample and URO1YT(1/10) media, along with bacterial prey.

From the works of Yabuki et al., further research has been done to complete the mitochondrial genome sequence and to determine its evolutionary relationship to other discobids. From this, Tsukubamonas is currently recognized as an independent discobid lineage.

== Habitat and ecology ==
Tsukubamonas is identified to be a free-living, fresh-water organism. It feeds on bacterial prey through a ventral feeding groove with assistance of its spinning swimming movement.

== Description ==
Tsukubamonas is characterised by having a spherical or semi-spherical cell shape in its vegetative form that is around 9-15μm in diameter. The cells are described to be naked (lacking a cell wall), colorless, highly vacuolated, and biflagellated, swimming in a clockwise spinning manner. The mitochondria present tubular cristae with no rough endoplasmic reticulum associated. In addition, cysts. with a spherical shape around 5-12μm in diameter without a flagellum, are also observed within this genus, although precisely where in its life cycle this occurs has not yet been determined by research.

The vacuoles of Tsukubamonas can be seen throughout the cell in a high number, at times derived from the endoplasmic reticulum. Cells lack contractile vacuole and contain food vacuoles that digest prey. In addition, thin flattened vesicles underneath the dorsal surface of the cell membrane, common amongst genus outside of the Excavata, are also a characteristic of this genera. This characteristic is only seen within one species of the excavate group, kinetoplastids, Hemistasia phaeocysticola.

Tsukubamonas possesses two flagella, each around 20μm long, with the standard 9 x 2 + 2 axoneme pattern. They emerge from a flat area to form a shallow groove on the ventral side as a feeding structure that is the hallmark to excavates (“Ventral feeding groove”). The groove occurs temporarily for the engulfment of prey, most often bacterial cells, with the rim being supported by microtubules. In addition, the flagellar apparatus contains 5 major structures and their associated fibres and roots (four basal bodies, three major microtubular roots, four major fibres, one microtubule organization center, and several internal microtubules), with the absence of vanes and hair or scale-like structures.

The flagellar apparatus is composed of five major structures including four basal bodies, three major microtubular roots, four major fibres, one microtubule organization center, and several internal microtubules. Of the four basal bodies, two give rise to flagella. The non-flagellated bodies are shorter in length and are found pointed laterally on the ventral right side of the flagellated basal bodies.

Associated with the flagellated basal bodies are the three major microtubular roots: The singlet root, anterior root, and right root. The singlet root runs posteriorly, originating between the dorsal right side of the posterior basal body and A fibre, while the anterior root originates from the left side of the anterior basal body. The anterior root consists of 6 microtubules and stretches down the dorsal left side of the cell, just beneath the cell surface, stopping at around 3μm from its origin. The right root is the main supportive structure of the ventral groove and is composed of over 30 microtubules; a broad band that stretches as an S shape posteriorly from the origin shared with the singlet root at the right of the posterior basal body. It is split into the inner and outer right root, derived from the left and right section of the right root respectively. The inner right root extends to the posterior end of the cell and connects with the lobate part of the singlet root associated fibre. The outer right root begins adjacent to the inner right root with the angle becoming less acute along the cell membrane. Microtubules are widely spread at the central area of the right root, drawing to the dorsal side of the cell.

The four major fibres found in Tsukubamonas are the A fibre, I fibre, and the singlet root associated fibre. Tsukubamonas cells include several internal microtubules nucleating from one microtubule organization center seen from the diesel left side of both the anterior and posterior basal body. These microtubules then spread to the dorsal region of the cell.

=== Life cycles ===
There are two forms of Tsukubamonas that can take place within a life cycle: a free-living biflagellate vegetative cell, or a cyst. Having been recently discovered, the specific description of the life cycle is currently unknown.

=== Genetics ===
==== Mitochondrial genome ====
The mitochondrial genome is a 48,643 base pair long circular molecule. 90% of the mitochondrial genome consists of coding regions, with 26 transfer RNA(tRNA) genes, 3 ribosomal RNA genes, and 52 open reading frames. 41 out of the 52 open reading frames are present in jakobid mitochondrial genome. Introns are absent, and the genetic code only differs from the standard one with the initiation codon being atp1.
