= Jakobid =

Jakobids
- Four jakobid species, showing groove and flagella: Jakoba libera (ventral view), Stygiella incarcerata (ventral view), Reclinomonas americana (dorsal view), and Histiona aroides (ventral view)

Scientific classification
- Domain: Eukaryota
- Clade: Discoba
- Class: Jakobea; Cavalier-Smith 1997, emend. 2003
- Order: Jakobida; Cavalier-Smith 1993

Families
- Agogoniidae; Andaluciidae; Moramonadidae; Jakobidae; Histionidae; Ophirinidae; Stygiellidae

Synonyms
- Jacobidea Cavalier-Smith 1993

Clade of eukaryotes

Jakobida is an order (sole order in the class Jakobea) of free-living, heterotrophic, flagellar eukaryotes in the clade Discoba. They are small (less than 15 μm), and can be found in aerobic and anaerobic environments. The order Jakobida, believed to be monophyletic, consists of only twenty species at present, and was classified as a group in 1993. There is ongoing research into the mitochondrial genomes of jakobids, which are unusually large and bacteria-like, evidence that jakobids may be important to the evolutionary history of eukaryotes.

Molecular phylogenetic evidence suggests strongly that jakobids are most closely related to Heterolobosea and Euglenozoa.

== Description ==
Jakobids have two flagella, inserted in the anterior end of the cell, and, like other members of order Excavata, have a ventral feeding groove and associated cytoskeleton support. The posterior flagella has a dorsal vane and is aligned within the ventral groove, where it generates a current that the cell uses for food intake. The nucleus is generally in the anterior part of the cell and bears a nucleolus. Most known jakobids have one mitochondrion, again located anteriorly, and different genera have flattened, tubular, or absent cristae. Food vacuoles are mostly located on the cell posterior, and in most jakobids the endoplasmic reticulum is distributed throughout the cell.

The sessile, loricate Histionidae and occasionally free-swimming Jakoba libera (Jakobidae) have extrusomes under the dorsal membrane that are theorized to be defensive structures.

Representation of a jakobid

== Ecology ==
Jakobids are widely dispersed, having been found in soil, freshwater, and marine habitats, but generally not common. However, environmental DNA surveys suggest that Stygiellidae are abundant in anoxic marine habitats. Some are capable of surviving hypersaline and anoxic environments, though the Histionids have only been found in freshwater ecosystems, where they attach themselves to algae or zooplankton. Outside of obligate sessile species, many species of jakobids can attach temporarily to surfaces, using either of the two flagella or the cell body itself.

All known jakobids are heterotrophic suspension feeders. Their primary prey is generally considered to be bacteria, though one species has been observed eating extremely small (< 1 μm) eukaryotic cells. Jakobids are generally slow swimmers, with low clearance rates relative to similar organisms.

No study has suggested jakobids might be pathogenic or toxic.

== Mitochondrial DNA ==
Since jakobids have no current commercial use, most research into jakobids has focused on their evolutionary significance. The mitochondrial DNA of jakobids is the most bacteria-like of all known eukaryotic mitochondrial DNA, suggesting that jakobid mitochondrial genomes might approximate the ancestral mitochondrial genome.

Jakobid mitochondrial DNA is substantially different from most other eukaryotes, especially in terms of the number of genes (nearly 100 in some species) and bacteria-like elements within their genomes. Nine of the genes have never been found in eukaryotic mitochondrial DNA. Uniquely, jakobid mitochondrial genomes code for bacteria-type RNA polymerase, as opposed to typical eukaryotic mitochondrial RNA polymerase, referred to as "phage-type", which appears to be viral in origin. This does not necessarily mean that jakobids are basal to the phylogeny of eukaryotes. While jakobid mitochondria have genetic features that seem to have developed from bacteria, and apparently lack phage-type RNA, it is possible that other eukaryotic clades lost their bacterial features independently.

Several proposed possibilities might explain the bacterial features of jakobid mitochondrial DNA. One is that jakobids diverged very early from the rest of the eukaryotes. This hypothesis depends on whether or not jakobids are indeed basal to all living eukaryotes, but there is no evidence yet to support that suggestion.

Another hypothesis is that the phage-type RNA polymerase moved from one eukaryote group to another via lateral gene transfer, replacing the bacteria-type enzyme, and simply did not reach the jakobids. This would not depend on jakobids being basal to eukaryotes as a whole, but has not been widely studied.

A third possibility is the reverse of the others, suggesting that the phage-type RNA polymerase is the basal one. Under this scenario, jakobids acquired their bacteria-type RNA polymerase much more recently and that then spread via lateral gene transfer. However, the gene arrangement of jakobid mitochondrial DNA suggests an ancestral origin of bacteria-type RNA polymerase over a more-recent divergence.

One of the proposed scenarios suggests that the common ancestor of eukaryotes had two mitochondrial RNA polymerases, both phage-type and bacteria-type, and jakobids lost their phage-type polymerase while the rest of the eukaryotes lost the bacteria-type, possibly several times. Such a model eliminates the need for jakobids to be truly basal. One study proposed that the phage-type and bacteria-type polymerases, when present in the same mitochondrion, served different functions, much in the way that the organelles of land plants have two different RNA polymerase enzymes that transcribe different genes.

== Taxonomy ==
Jakobida contains five families consisting of mostly free-swimming genera: Jakobidae, Moramonadidae, Andaluciidae, and Stygiellidae. The sixth family, Histionidae, is largely populated by sessile loricate genera, and includes the first jakobids ever described.

Jakobida is a monophyletic group, and are most closely related to the Euglenozoa and Heterolobosea.

Cladogram of Jakobida

- - - Ophirinina
      - Agogoniidae
        Agogonia
      - Ophirinidae
        Ophirinia
  - - Andalucina
      - Andaluciidae
        Andalucia
      - Stygiellidae
        - Velundella
        - Stygiella
    - Histionina
      - - Moramonadidae
          - Moramonas
          - Seculamonas
      - - Jakobidae
          Jakoba
        - Histionidae
          - Reclinomonas
          - Histiona

- Class Jakobea Cavalier-Smith 1999
  - Order Jakobida Cavalier-Smith 1993
    - Suborder Ophirinina Yabuki et al. 2018
      - Family Agogoniidae Galindo et al. 2023
        - Genus Agogonia Galindo et al. 2023
          - Species A. voluta Galindo et al. 2023
      - Family Ophirinidae Yabuki et al. 2018
        - Genus Ophirina Yabuki et al. 2018
          - Species O. amphinema Yabuki et al. 2018
          - Species O. chinija Galindo et al. 2023
    - Suborder Andalucina Cavalier-Smith 2013
      - Family Andaluciidae Cavalier-Smith 2013
        - Genus Andalucia Lara et al. 2006
          - Species A. godoyi Lara et al. 2006
      - Family Stygiellidae Pánek, Táborský & Čepička 2015
        - Genus Velundella Pánek, Táborský & Čepička 2015
          - Species V. nauta Pánek, Táborský & Čepička 2015
          - Species V. trypanoides Pánek, Táborský & Čepička 2015
        - Genus Stygiella Pánek, Táborský & Čepička 2015 non Bruand 1853
          - Species S. incarcerata (Bernard, Simpson & Patterson 2000) Pánek, Táborský & Čepička 2015 [Jakoba incarcerata Bernard, Simpson & Patterson 2000; Andalucia incarcerata (Bernard, Simpson & Patterson 2000) Lara et al. 2006]
          - Species S. agilis Pánek, Táborský & Čepička 2015
          - Species S. cryptica Pánek, Táborský & Čepička 2015
          - Species S. adhaerens Pánek, Táborský & Čepička 2015
    - Suborder Histonina Cavalier-Smith 1993
      - Species ?Jakoba echidna O'Kelly 1991
      - Family Moramonadidae Strassert et al. 2016
        - Genus Moramonas Strassert et al. 2016
          - Species M. marocensis Strassert et al. 2016
        - Genus Seculamonas Marx et al. 2003 nomen nudum
          - Species S. ecuadoriensis Marx et al. 2003 nomen nudum
      - Family Jakobidae Patterson 1990
        - Genus Jakoba Patterson 1990
          - Species J. bahamiensis Burger & Lang (indeitum)
          - Species J. libera (Ruinen 1938) Patterson 1990 [Cryptobia libera Ruinen 1938]
      - Family Histionidae Flavin & Nerad 1993
        - Genus Histiona Voigt 1902 [Zachariasia Voigt 1901 non Lemmermann 1895]
          - Species ?H. planctonica Scourfield 1937
          - Species H. aroides Pascher 1943
          - Species H. velifera (Voigt 1901) Pascher 1943 [Zachariasia velifera Voigt 1901; Histiona zachariasii Voigt 1901 nom. illeg.]
        - Genus Reclinomonas Flavin & Nerad 1993
          - Species R. americana Flavin & Nerad 1993
          - Species R. campanula (Penard 1921) Flavin & Nerad 1993 [Histiona campanula Penard 1921; Stenocodon campanula (Penard 1921) Pascher 1942]
        - Genus Stenocodon Pascher 1942
          - Species S epiplankton Pascher 1942
        - Genus Stomatochone Pascher 1942
          - Species S. infundibuliformis Pascher 1942
          - Species S. cochlear Pascher 1942
          - Species S. excavata Pascher 1942
          - Species S. epiplankton Pascher 1942

== See also ==
- Loukozoa
