= Carpediemonas =

Scientific classification
- Domain: Eukaryota
- Clade: incertae sedis
- Clade: Metamonada
- Phylum: Fornicata
- Informal group: Carpediemonas-like organisms
- Genus: Carpediemonas; Ekebom, Patterson & Vørs, 1996

Type species
- Carpediemonas membranifera (Larsen & Patterson 1990) Ekebom, Patterson & Vørs 1996

Species
- C. frisia; C. membranifera

Genus of protists

Carpediemonas is genus of Metamonada, and belongs to the group Excavata. This organism is a unicellular flagellated eukaryote that was first discovered in substrate samples from the Great Barrier Reef. Carpediemonas can be found in anaerobic intertidal sediment, where it feeds on bacteria. A feature of this species is the presence of a feeding groove, a characteristic of the excavates. Like most other metamonads, Carpediemonas does not rely on an aerobic mitochondrion to produce energy. Instead, it contains hydrogenosomes that are used to produce ATP. This organism has two flagella: a posterior one used for feeding on the substrate, and an anterior one that moves in a slower sweeping motion. Carpediemonas is assigned to the fornicates, where similar Carpediemonas-like organisms are used in researching the evolution within excavates. Although Carpediemonas is a member of the metamonads, it is unusual in the sense that it is free-living and has three basal bodies.

== Etymology ==
The name Carpediemonas originates from three Latin roots, with carpe meaning "seize", die meaning "the day", and the suffix of monas, indicating a unicellular organism. The organism was named after carpe diem, meaning "to seize the day", in honour of the wife of one of the authors, who had recently died.

== History of study ==
Carpediemonas was first discovered by Larsen and Patterson (1990) who identified it as a previously unidentified Percolomonas and provided the name Percolomonas membranifera. Larsen and Patterson treated this organism as a heterolobosean, because it would occasionally have four flagella and contain a longitudinal groove. However, they did not have any evidence that the non-dividing organisms had more than two flagella. The species also contained a pouch with threads that may be difficult to discern from flagella. Ekebom et al. (1996) then renamed the organism as Carpediemonas membranifera when it was found from substrate samples in the Great Barrier Reef and classified it as a metamonad. Additionally, a metabolic relationship of Carpediemonas with prokaryotic communities was found in Carpediemonas frisia. C. frisia was found to release biomolecules that have been predigested. Prokaryotic communities would rely on C. frisia for incompletely digested organic material and the oxidation of various biomolecules. On the other hand, C. frisia relies on the prokaryotic organism, Deltaproteobacteria, for its hydrogen oxidizing activity.

== Habitat and ecology ==
Carpediemonas can be found in anaerobic intertidal sediments, where it feeds on bacteria. It can be found co-existing with Cafeteria marsupialis in these anaerobic environments.

== Description ==
Ekebom et al. (1996) describes Carpediemonas as organisms with a size of approximately 5 μm long (with a range of 4–7.5 μm). Carpediemonas has a longitudinal depression that spans almost the entire ventral side of the cell. It often has two unequal flagella inserting to the anterior side of the ventral groove, but may sometimes have three or four flagella. The acronematic posterior flagellum is used in feeding and to attach to substrate, while the anterior flagellum beats less rapidly and in a slow sweeping motion. Further studies by Simpson and Patterson (1999) go into greater detail about the flagella and describe the flagellar apparatus as having a third, barren basal body. Supporting the dorsal side of the cell is a microtubular fan with a microtubular root at the anterior end. On the ventral side, microtubules extending from different flagellar roots support the ventral groove. The anterior flagellum has a "9+2" axoneme. Simpson and Patterson described that in addition to the "9+2" axoneme, the posterior flagellum also has "three radiating lamellae of electron-dense material which form the central components of vanes". The first lamella arises from after the flagellar insertion and is directed ventrally. The second lamella originates opposite from the first lamella. The third lamella supports the third vane, which is located more distally and lies perpendicular to the other two vanes or lamellae. All three lamella have striations when viewed in a longitudinal section and these striations are perpendicular to the "9+2" axoneme. Carpediemonas contains a single ovate nucleus, located anteriorly in the cell. The nucleolus can also be found subcentrally within the nucleus. Carpediemonas also has no mitochondria, which is typical of metamonads. Instead, it has hydrogenosomes, likely derived from anaerobic mitochondria. It also contains a single Golgi dictyosome, located anteriorly, dorsally, and to the left of the flagellar apparatus. The endoplasmic reticulum in this genus is mainly found near the periphery of the cell. Around the cytoplasm, food vacuoles containing bacterial contents can be found. Also, three centrioles are present in Carpediemonas.

== Taxonomy ==
Carpediemonas is classified as an excavate because it has the characteristic feeding groove of the group. Within the excavates, Carpediemonas is assigned to the fornicates. In the fornicates, Carpediemonas-like organisms (CLOs) have allowed for the better understanding of the evolution of anaerobic excavates by studying their cytoskeletal traits and modified mitochondria. An example of a Carpediemonas-like organism that was used to study the evolutionary history within excavates is Kipferlia bialata. According to recent research this organism is able to replicate without some key proteins for replicating DNA.

== DNA replication, chromosome segregation, and sex ==
A 2021 study using comparative genomics has revealed extensive loss of the DNA replication and segregation protein complements within Metamonada and has highlighted that the genomes of C. membranifera and C. frisia are even further reduced. These genomes lack the DNA replication proteins of the origin recognition complex (ORC), Cdc6, some components of the GINS complex and some subunits of polymerases delta and epsilon, as well as most structural kinetochore subunits, a microtubule plus-end tracking complex and all subunits of the Ndc80 complex involved in chromosome segregation. ORC and Cdc6 are proteins in charge of replication initiation and licensing in eukaryotes, and their absence appears to indicate the existence of a non-standard and as-yet undescribed mechanism to start replication. The absence of Ndc80 complex proteins also suggest that a non-standard mechanism could be in place for chromosome attachment to microtubules for chromosome segregation. Carpediemonas is the first known eukaryote to possess such drastically altered DNA replication and segregation machineries. Since Carpediemonas reproduces, it is obvious that they do replicate their DNA and researchers have proposed a hypothesis on how replication starts. This hypothesis uses elements of processes observed in other species but takes into account the specific protein complements found in Carpediemonas. In short: replication is proposed to proceed by a Dmc1-dependent homologous recombination mechanism that does not require origins of replication and that is mediated by RNA:DNA hybrids. This hypothesis still needs to be experimentally proven. Sexual or parasexual reproduction have not been directly observed in Metamonada. However, the study confirms the conservation of key meiotic proteins in the group with the bonus finding that Carpediemonas species have homologs from the tmcB family and sperm-specific channel subunits, the latter only previously reported in Opisthokonta and three other protists. The presence of such proteins means that further investigations are required to understand if sex occurs, and if these proteins actually participate during sex and what their role could be.
