= Crista =

Fold in the inner membrane of a mitochondrion

Cell biology
- mitochondrion
- Components of a typical mitochondrion 1 Outer membrane 1.1 Porin 2 Intermembrane space 2.1 Intracristal space 2.2 Peripheral space 3 Lamella 3.1 Inner membrane 3.11 Inner boundary membrane 3.12 Cristal membrane 3.2 Matrix 3.3 Cristae ◄ You are here 4 Mitochondrial DNA; 5 Matrix granule 6 Mitochondrial ribosome 7 ATP synthase

A crista (/ˈkrɪstə/; pl.: cristae) is a fold in the inner membrane of a mitochondrion. Cristae give the inner membrane its characteristic wrinkled shape, providing a large amount of surface area for biochemical reactions, especially oxidative phosphorylation to occur on. Cristae are studded with proteins, including ATP synthase and a variety of cytochromes.

== Background ==
With the discovery of the dual-membrane structure of mitochondria, the pioneers of mitochondrial ultrastructural research proposed different models for the organization of the mitochondrial inner membrane. Three models proposed were:

- Baffle model – According to Palade (1953), the mitochondrial inner membrane is convoluted in a baffle-like manner with broad openings towards the intra-cristal space. This model entered most textbooks and was widely believed for a long time.
- Septa model – Sjöstrand (1953) suggested that sheets of inner membrane are spanned like septa (plural of septum) through the matrix, separating it into several distinct compartments.
- Crista junction model – Daems and Wisse (1966) proposed that cristae are connected to the inner boundary membrane via tubular structures characterized by rather small diameters, termed crista junctions (CJs). In the middle of 1990s these structures were rediscovered by EM tomography, leading to the establishment of this currently widely accepted model.

More recent research (2019) finds rows of ATP synthase dimers (formerly known as "elementary particles" or "oxysomes") forming at the cristae. These membrane-curving dimers have a bent shape, and may be the first step to cristae formation. They are situated at the base of the crista. A mitochondrial contact site cristae organizing system (MICOS) protein complex occupies the crista junction. Proteins like OPA1 are involved in cristae remodeling.

Crista are traditionally sorted by shapes into lamellar, tubular, and vesicular cristae. They appear in different cell types. It is debated whether these shapes arise by different pathways.

== Structure and composition ==
Like other regions of the inner mitochondrial membrane, the cristae is rich in cardiolipin and lacks cholesterol, therefore it is much less permeable to molecules than other membranes. Cristae are not folds that are set in stone. They are dynamic structures highly modulated by factors such as stress and nutrition.

The cristae is thought to be evolved from bacterial mesosomes, making the function of mitochondria more like a bacteria enclosed by a eukaryotic membrane.

== Function ==
The cristae greatly increase the surface area of the inner membrane, and provides a platform supporting enzymes and transporters responsible for the electron transport chain, synthesis of ATP, and other mitochondrial functions.

Mathematical modelling suggested that the optical properties of the cristae in filamentous mitochondria may affect the generation and propagation of light within the tissue.

=== Electron transport chain ===
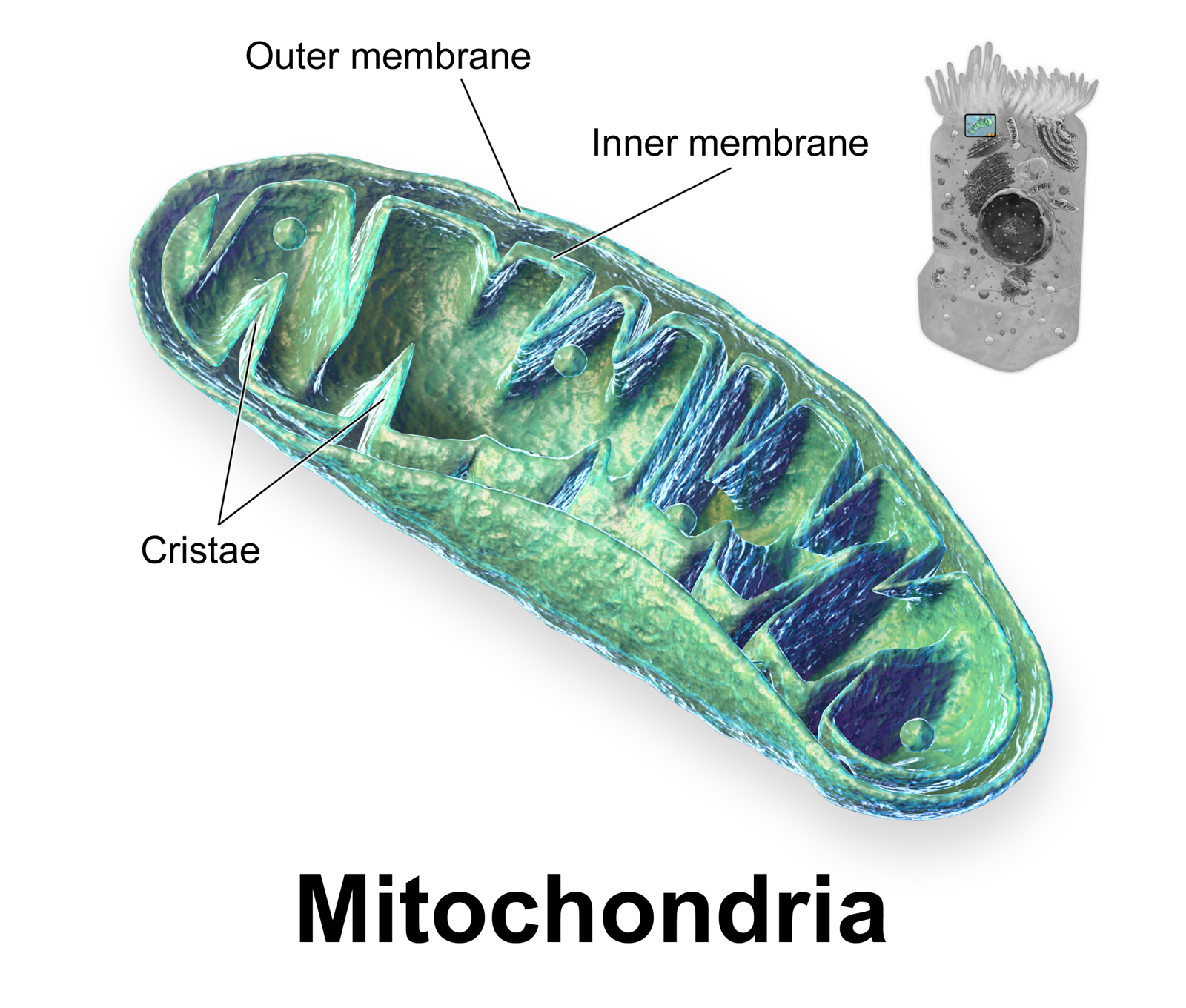
A mitochondrion, with labeled cristae.

The electron transport chain is responsible for the release of energy from high-energy electrons stored as NADH and FADH2. The energy is used to pump H^{+} ions into the intermembrane space, establishing an electrochemical gradient, while electrons are ultimately received by oxygen, forming water.This electrochemical gradient creates a proton-motive force across the inner membrane, driving the synthesis of ATP catalysed by ATP synthase.

=== ATP synthesis ===
ATP Synthase utilizes the electrochemical gradient established by oxidation of NADH and FADH_{2} molecules to drive the synthesis of ATP. Oxidation of an NADH and FADH_{2} molecule can drive the synthesis of 3 and 2 ATPs, respectively.

As an example, one molecule of glucose gives out 8 NADH and 2 FADH_{2} molecules through glycolysis and the Krebs cycle, at the price of which, 28 ATPs are generated. This means that combined with the Krebs Cycle and glycolysis, the efficiency for the electron transport chain is about 65%, as compared to only 3.5% efficiency for glycolysis alone.
