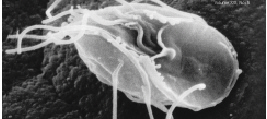
- Giardia lamblia, a parasitic diplomonad

Scientific classification (obsolete as paraphyletic)
- Domain: Eukaryota
- (unranked): Excavata; Cavalier-Smith 2002 emend. Simpson 2003

Groups included
- Malawimonadida; Metamonada; Discoba

Cladistically included but traditionally excluded taxa
- All other eukaryotes

= Excavata =

Excavates Temporal range: Neoproterozoic–present

Obsolete grouping of single-celled organisms

Three types of excavate cells. Top: Jakobida, 1-nucleus, 2-anterior flagellum, 3-ventral/posterior flagellum, 4-ventral feeding groove. Middle: Euglenozoa, 1-nucleus, 2-flagellar pocket/reservoir, 3-dorsal/anterior flagellum, 4-ventral/posterior flagellum, 5-cytostome/feeding apparatus. Bottom: Metamonada, 1-anterior flagella, 2-parabasal body, 3-undulating membrane, 4-posterior flagellum, 5-nucleus, 6-axostyle.

Excavata is an obsolete, extensive and diverse paraphyletic group of unicellular Eukaryota. The group was first suggested by Simpson and Patterson in 1999 and the name latinized and assigned a rank by Thomas Cavalier-Smith in 2002. It contains a variety of free-living and symbiotic protists, and includes some important parasites of humans such as Giardia and Trichomonas. Excavates were formerly considered to be included in the now- obsolete Protista kingdom. They were distinguished from other lineages based on electron-microscopic information about how the cells are arranged (they have a distinctive ultrastructural identity). They are considered to be a basal flagellate lineage.

On the basis of phylogenomic analyses, the group was shown to contain three widely separated eukaryote groups, the discobids, metamonads, and malawimonads. A current view of the composition of the excavates is given below, indicating that the group is paraphyletic. Except for some Euglenozoa, all are non-photosynthetic.

== Characteristics ==
Most excavates are unicellular, heterotrophic flagellates. Only some Euglenozoa are photosynthetic. In some (particularly anaerobic intestinal parasites), the mitochondria have been greatly reduced. Some excavates lack "classical" mitochondria, and are called "amitochondriate", although most retain a mitochondrial organelle in greatly modified form (e.g. a hydrogenosome or mitosome). Among those with mitochondria, the mitochondrial cristae may be tubular, discoidal, or in some cases, laminar. Most excavates have two, four, or more flagella. Many have a conspicuous ventral feeding groove with a characteristic ultrastructure, supported by microtubules—the "excavated" appearance of this groove giving the organisms their name. However, various groups that lack these traits are considered to be derived excavates based on genetic evidence (primarily phylogenetic trees of molecular sequences).

The Acrasidae slime molds are the only excavates to exhibit limited multicellularity. Like other cellular slime molds, they live most of their life as single cells, but will sometimes assemble into larger clusters.

== Proposed group ==
Excavate relationships were always uncertain, suggesting that they are not a monophyletic group. Phylogenetic analyses often do not place malawimonads on the same branch as the other Excavata. Discoba and Metamonada still form a monophyletic group in some trees, which can be called Excavata to the exclusion of Malawimonada.

Excavates were thought to include multiple groups:

| Taxon | Included taxa | Representative genera (examples) | Description |
|---|---|---|---|
| Discoba or JEH or Eozoa | Tsukubea | Tsukubamonas | |
| Discoba or JEH or Eozoa | Euglenozoa | Euglena, Trypanosoma | Many important parasites, one large group with plastids (chloroplasts) |
| Discoba or JEH or Eozoa | Heterolobosea | Naegleria, Acrasis | Most alternate between flagellate and amoeboid forms |
| Discoba or JEH or Eozoa | Jakobida | Jakoba, Reclinomonas | Free-living, sometimes loricate flagellates, with very gene-rich mitochondrial genomes |
| Metamonada or POD | Preaxostyla | Monocercomonoides, Trimastix | Amitochondriate flagellates, either free-living (Trimastix, Paratrimastix) or living in the hindguts of insects |
| Metamonada or POD | Fornicata | Giardia, Carpediemonas | Amitochondriate, mostly symbiotes and parasites of animals. |
| Metamonada or POD | Parabasalia | Trichomonas | Amitochondriate flagellates, generally intestinal commensals of insects. Some human pathogens. |
| Metamonada or POD | Anaeramoebae | Anaeramoeba | Anaerobic protists with hydrogenosomes instead of mitochondria. |
| Malawimonadida | — | Malawimonas | |

=== Discobids or JEH clade ===
Euglenozoa and Heterolobosea (Percolozoa) or Eozoa (as named by Cavalier-Smith) appear to be particularly close relatives, and are united by the presence of discoid cristae within the mitochondria (superphylum Discicristata). A close relationship has been shown between Discicristata and Jakobida, the latter having tubular cristae like most other protists, and hence were united under the taxon name Discoba, which was proposed for this supposedly monophyletic group. This clade was defined as a node-based clade, receiving the definition "The least inclusive clade containing Jakoba libera (Ruinen, 1938) Patterson, 1990; Andalucia godoyi, Lara et al., 2006; Euglena gracilis Klebs 1883; and Naegleria gruberi (Schardinger, 1899) Alexeieff, 1912." Alternatively, the clade has been termed the jakobid, euglenozoan and heterolobosean group JEH.

=== Metamonads ===
Metamonads are unusual in not having classical mitochondria—instead they have hydrogenosomes, mitosomes or uncharacterised organelles. The oxymonad Monocercomonoides is reported to have completely lost homologous organelles. There are competing explanations.

=== Malawimonads ===
The malawimonads have been proposed to be members of Excavata owing to their typical excavate morphology, and phylogenetic affinity to other excavate groups in some molecular phylogenies. However, their position among eukaryotes remains elusive.

=== Ancyromonads ===
Ancyromonads are small free-living cells with a narrow longitudinal groove down one side of the cell. The ancyromonad groove is not used for "suspension feeding", unlike in "typical excavates" (e.g. malawimonads, jakobids, Trimastix, Carpediemonas, Kiperferlia, etc). Ancyromonads instead capture prokaryotes attached to surfaces. The phylogenetic placement of ancyromonads is poorly understood (in 2020), however some phylogenetic analyses place them as close relatives of malawimonads.

== Evolution ==
=== Origin of the eukaryotes ===
The conventional explanation for the origin of the eukaryotes is that a heimdallarchaeian or another Archaea acquired an alphaproteobacterium as an endosymbiont, and that this became the mitochondrion, the organelle providing oxidative respiration to the eukaryotic cell.

Caesar al Jewari and Sandra Baldauf argue instead that the eukaryotes possibly started with an endosymbiosis event of a Deltaproteobacterium or Gammaproteobacterium, accounting for the otherwise unexplained presence of anaerobic bacterial enzymes in Metamonada. The sister of the Preaxostyla within Metamonada represents the rest of the eukaryotes which acquired an Alphaproteobacterium. In their scenario, the hydrogenosome and mitosome, both conventionally considered "mitochondrion-derived organelles", would predate the mitochondrion, and instead be derived from the earlier symbiotic bacterium.

=== Phylogeny ===
In 2023, using molecular phylogenetic analysis of 186 taxa, Al Jewari and Baldauf proposed a phylogenetic tree with the metamonad Parabasalia as basal eukaryotes. Discoba and the rest of the Eukaryota appear to have emerged as sister taxon to the Preaxostyla, incorporating a single alphaproteobacterium as mitochondria by endosymbiosis. Thus the Fornicata are more closely related to e.g. animals than to Parabasalia. The rest of the eukaryotes emerged within the Excavata as sister of the Discoba; as they are within the same clade but are not cladistically considered part of the Excavata yet, the Excavata in this analysis is highly paraphyletic.

- - "Hodarchaeales"
  - Eukaryota + δ/γ‑proteobacterium
    - Parabasalia
    - - Fornicata
      - - Preaxostyla
        - + α‑proteobacterium
          - Discoba
            - Jakobida
            - - Heterolobosea
              - Euglenozoa and allies
          - Neokaryotes
            - Amorphea (inc. animals, fungi)
            - - SAR
              - Archaeplastida (inc. plants)

The Anaeramoebae are associated with Parabasalia, but could turn out to be more basal as the root of a tree is often difficult to pinpoint.

== See also ==
Metakaryota

== Gallery ==
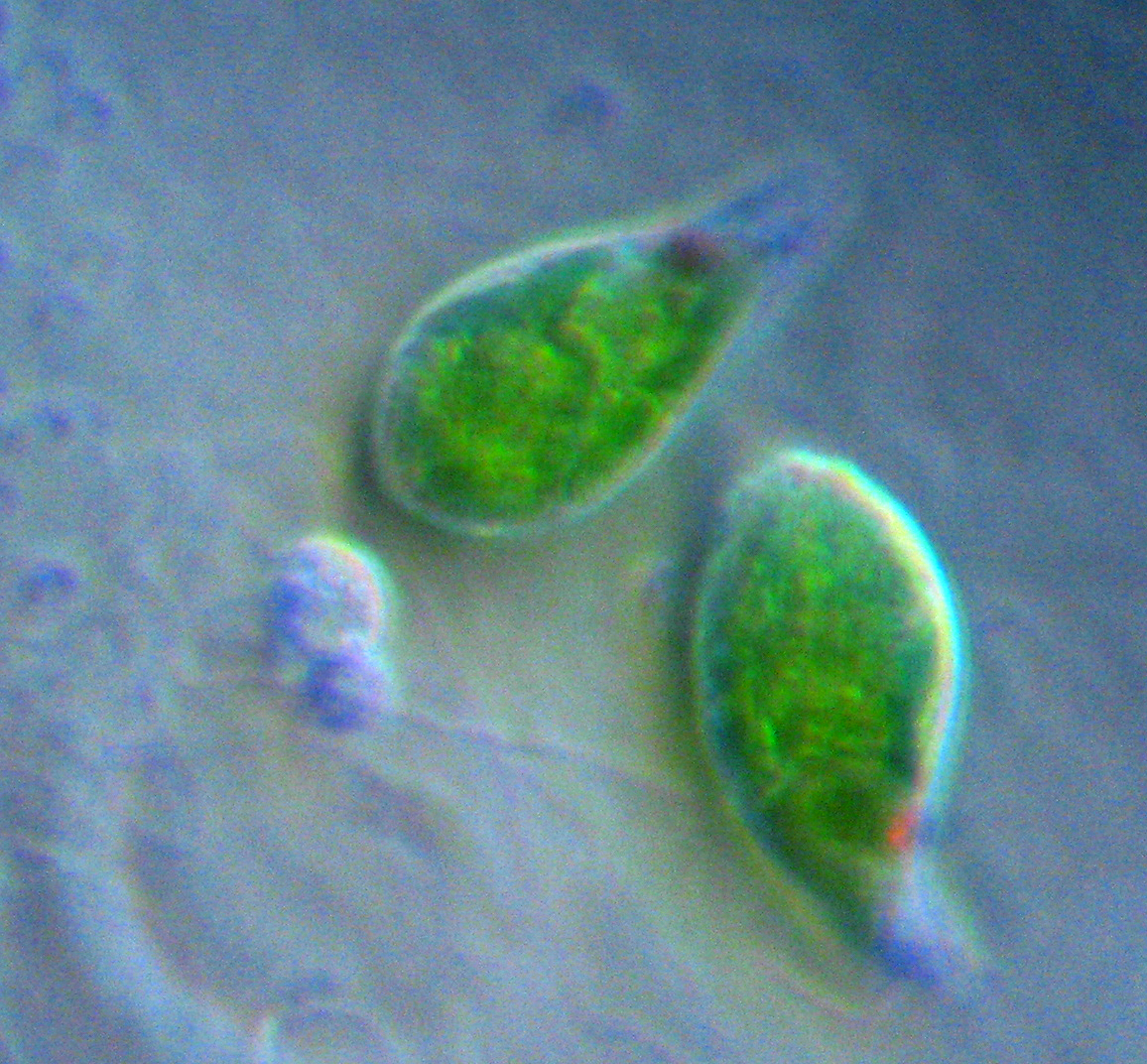
Euglena (Euglenozoa: Euglenoida)

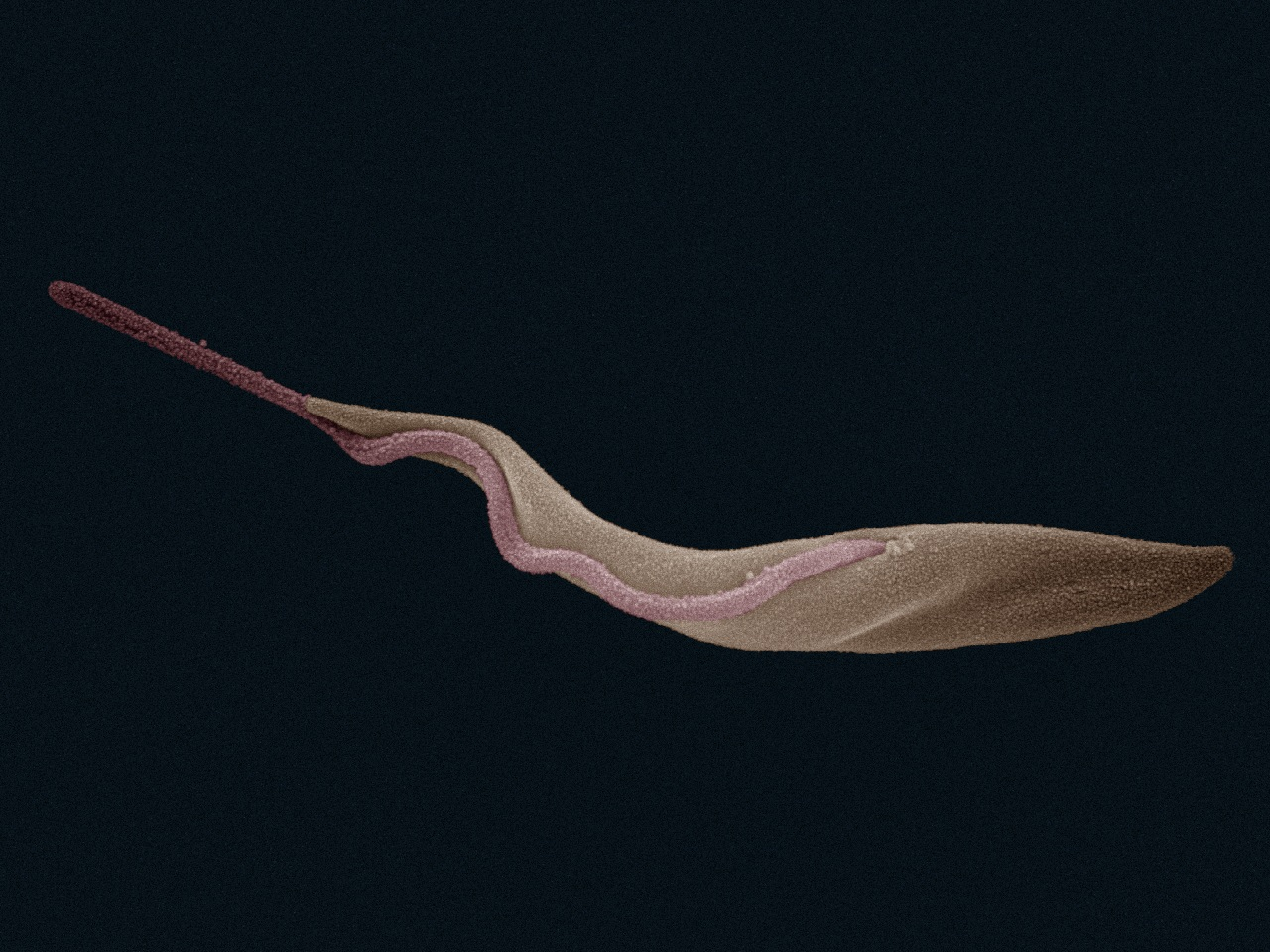
Trypanosoma brucei (Euglenozoa: Kinetoplastida)

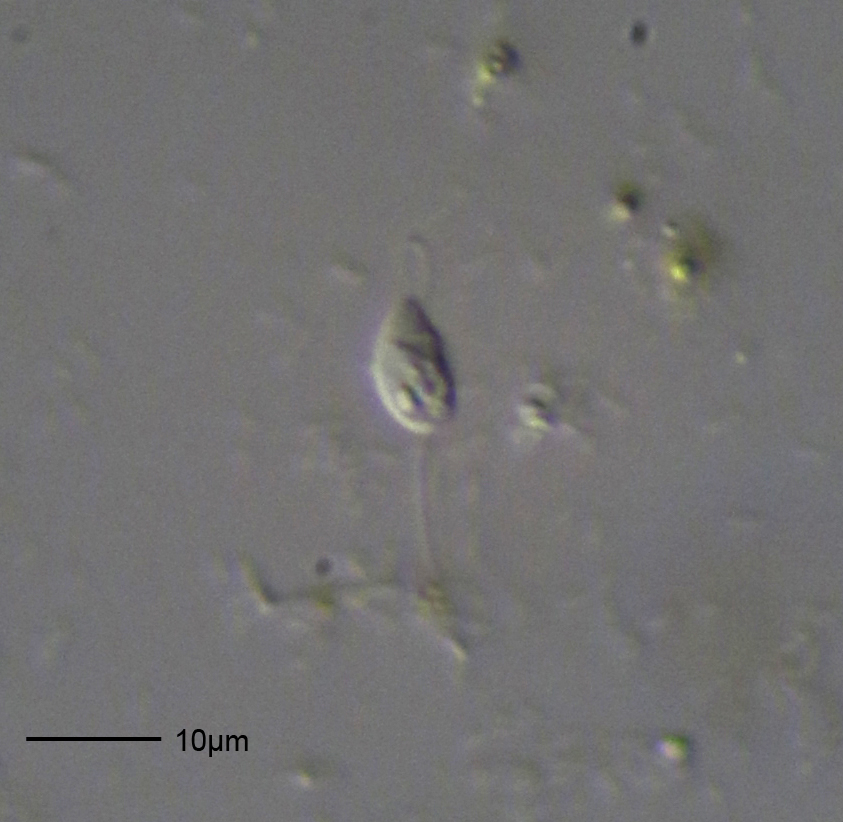
Bodo sp. (Euglenozoa: Kinetoplastida)

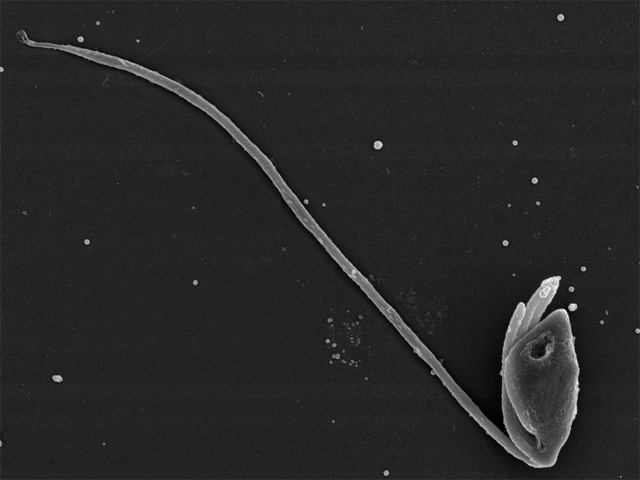
Percolomonas sp. (Percolozoa)

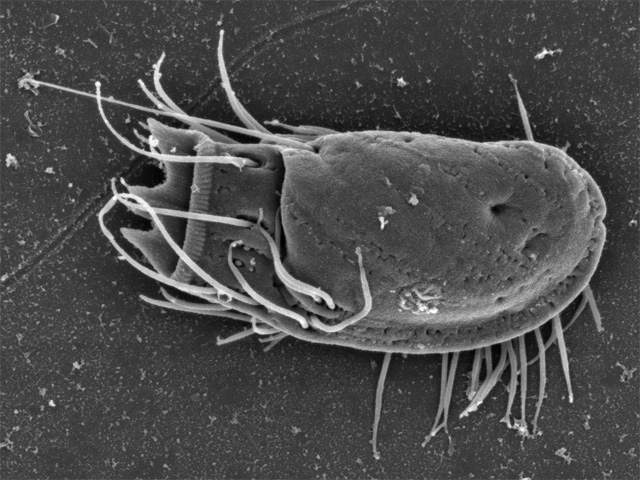
Stephanopogon sp. (Percolozoa)

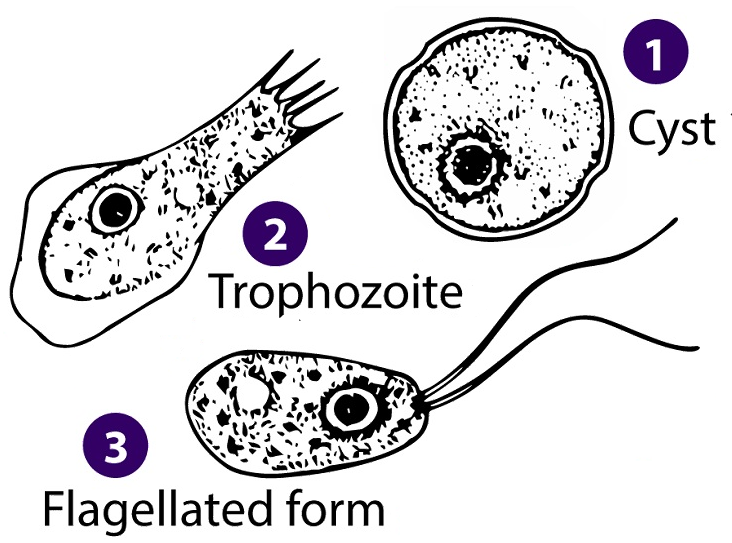
Stages of Naegleria sp. (Percolozoa: Heterolobosea)

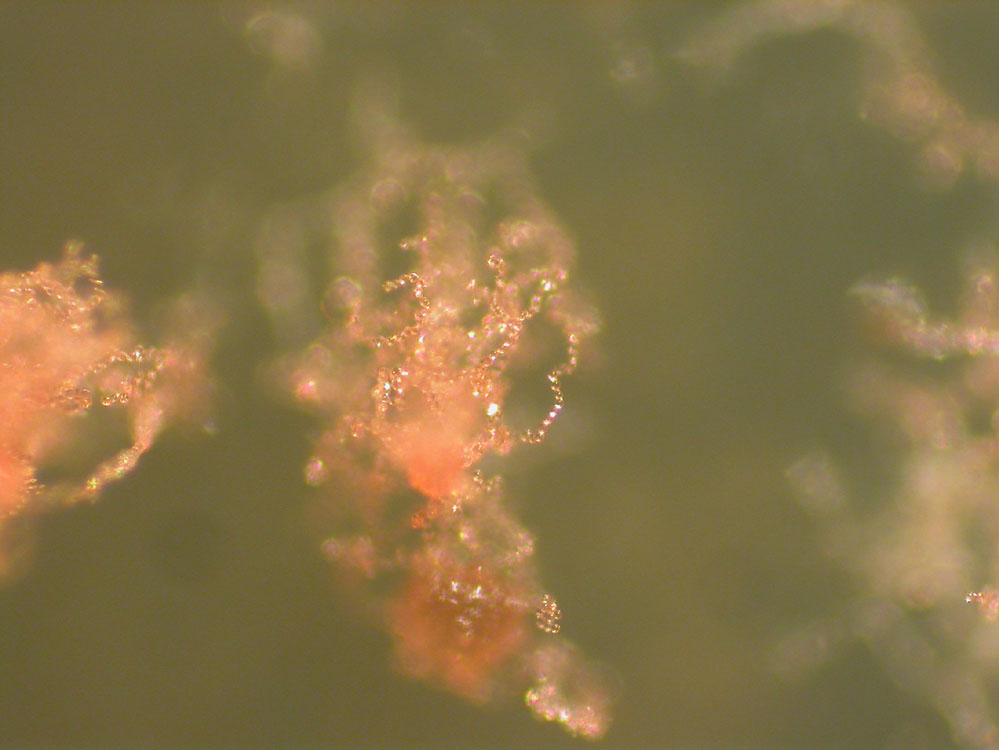
Acrasis rosea (Percolozoa: Heterolobosea)

Jakobids (Jakobida)

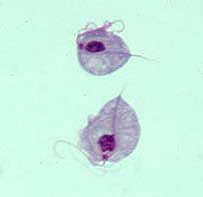
Trichomonas vaginalis (Metamonada: Parabasalia)

Retortamonas sp., left (Metamonada: Fornicata: Retortamonadida)

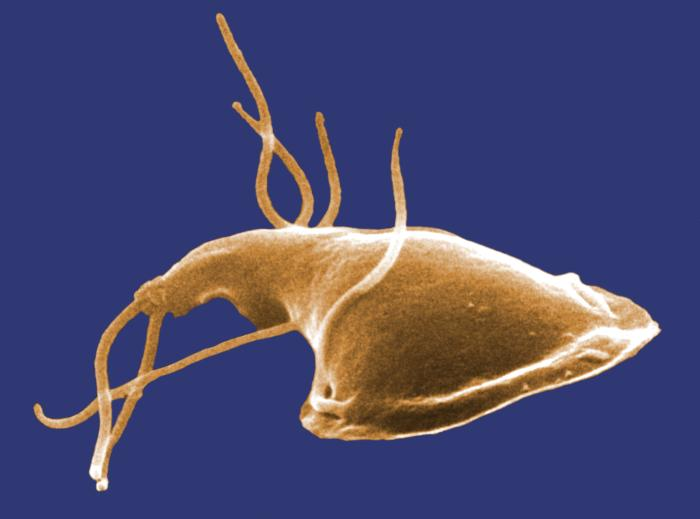
Giardia sp. (Metamonada: Fornicata: Diplomonadida)
