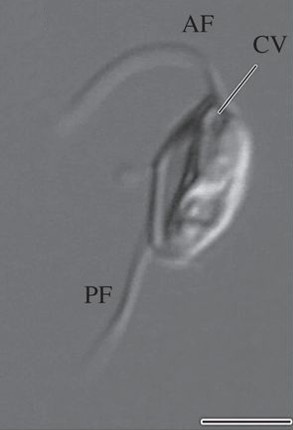
- Light microscopy image of Moramonas marocensis, a jakobid, showing anterior and posterior flagella (AF and PF) and contractile vacuole (CV)

Scientific classification
- Domain: Eukaryota
- Clade: Discoba; Simpson in Hampl et al. 2009

Subgroups
- Jakobida; Tsukubamonas; Discicristata; Heterolobosea; Euglenozoa

= Discoba =

Group of single-celled microbes

Discoba is a diverse lineage of single-celled protists with two flagella. It is one of the main supergroups of eukaryotes, robustly supported by phylogenetic analyses. It contains three major groups: the Euglenozoa, Heterolobosea, and Jakobida, as well as the species Tsukubamonas globosa.
