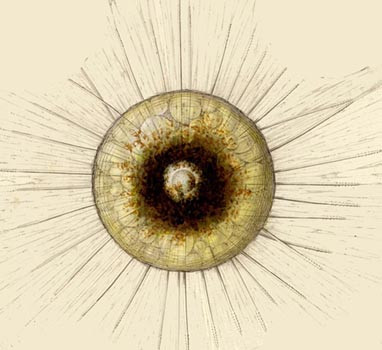
- Aulacantha, a Radiolarian

Scientific classification
- Domain: Eukaryota
- (unranked): Orthokaryotes; Cavalier-Smith 2018

Clades
- Jakobid; Neokaryotes

= Orthokaryotes =

Proposed clade of eukaryotic organisms

The Orthokaryotes (Cavalier-Smith 2017) are a proposed Eukaryote clade consisting of the Jakobea and the Neokaryotes. Together with its sister Discicristata it forms a basal Eukaryote clade. They are characterized by stacked Golgi, orthogonal centrioles, and two opposite posterior ciliary roots.

== Taxonomy ==
A proposed cladogram is

- Eukaryota
  - Tsukubea
  - - Discicristata
      - Euglenozoa
      - Percolozoa
    - Orthokaryotes
      - Jakobea
      - Neokaryotes
        - Corticata/Diaphoretickes/ Bikont
          - Archaeplastida
          - Chromista
            - Hacrobia
            - SAR
        - Scotokaryotes/Opimoda/Neozoa
          - Metamonada
          - - Malawimonas
            - Sulcozoa/Podiata/ Sarcomastigota
              - Planomonadida
              - - - Mantamonadida
                  - Diphyllatea
                - Amorphea/ Unikont
                  - Amoebozoa
                  - Obazoa
                    - - Breviata
                      - Apusomonadida
                    - Opisthokonta/Choanozoa
