= Raphidiophrys drakena =

Scientific classification
- Domain: Eukaryota
- (unranked): Hacrobia
- Class: Centrohelea
- Order: Acanthocystida
- Family: Raphidiophryidae
- Genus: Raphidiophrys

Binomial name
- Raphidiophrys drakena Zlatogursky, 2016

Species of protist

Raphidiophrys drakena is a species of protist in the genus Raphidiophrys. It is a unicellular eukaryote with a cell diameter of 26.7±0.39 μm and several cell surface features like axopodia, kinecysts and a tangential scale layer. The scales have a length of 6.0±0.18 μm and a width of 3.5±0.14 μm. R. drakena differs from other morphologically studied members of the genus Rhaphidiophrys by lacking spicules on its surface.
