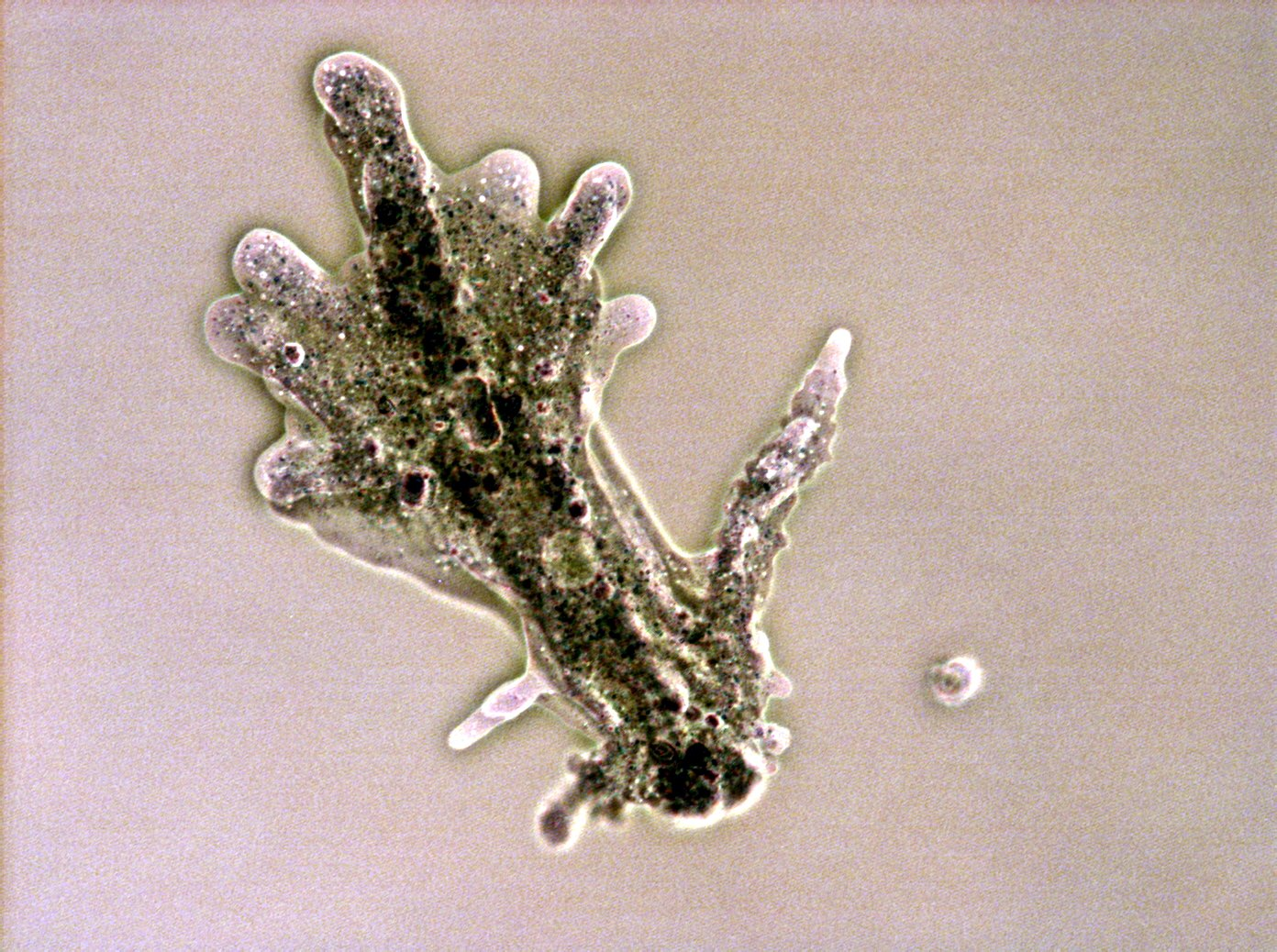
- Amoeba proteus, visible are the contractile vacuole (circular) and the nucleus (somewhat dumbbell-shaped)
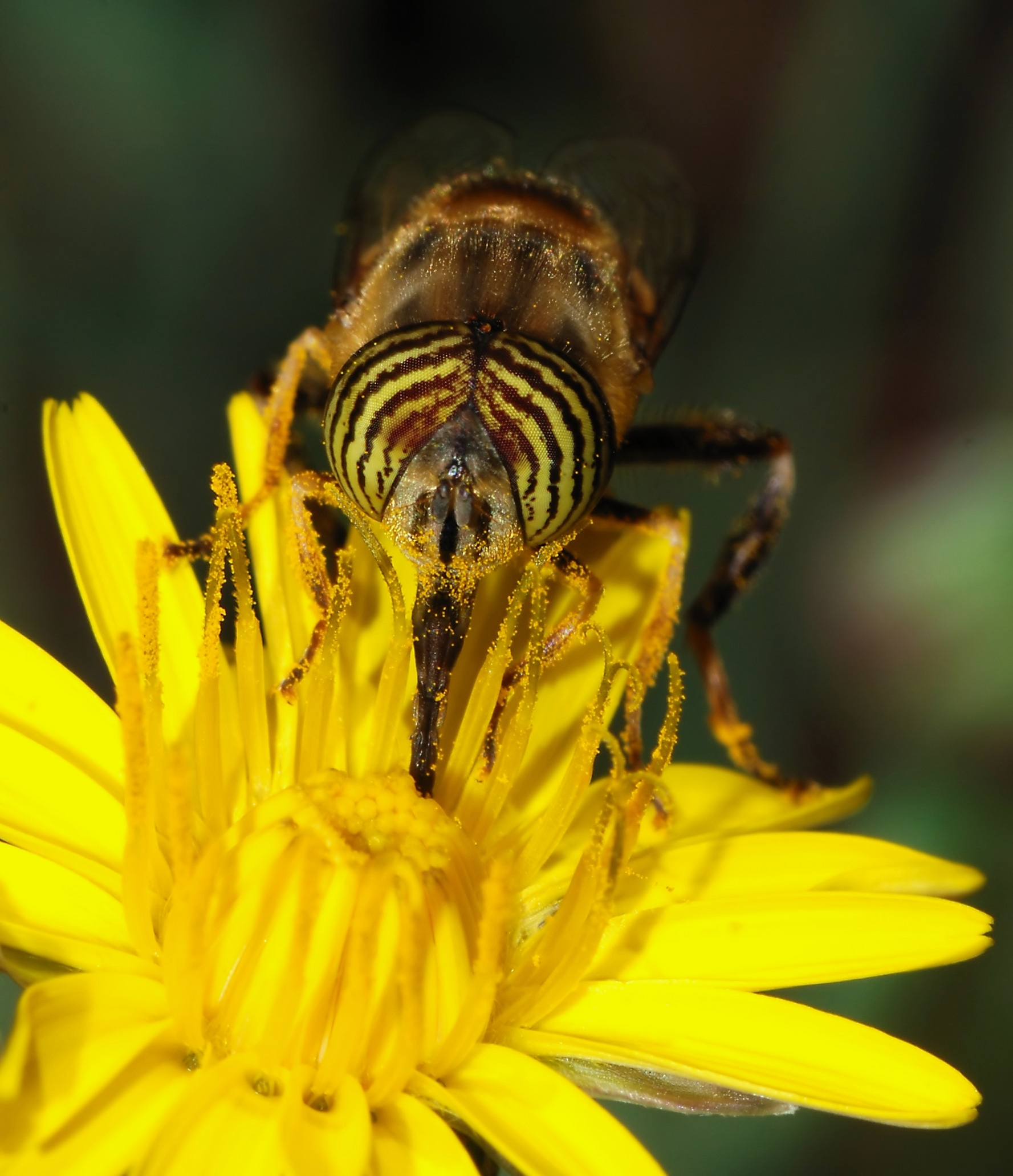
- Eristalinus taeniops (Scotokaryotes) and Hieracium lachenalii (Diaphoretickes)

Scientific classification
- Domain: Eukaryota
- (unranked): Orthokaryotes
- (unranked): Neokaryotes; Cavalier-Smith 1993

Clades
- Bikont (plants and their relatives); Opimoda (animals and their relatives)

= Neokaryotes =

Eukaryote clade consisting of most protists

The neokaryotes are a proposed eukaryote clade consisting of the unikonts and the bikonts as sister of for instance the Jakobea. It arises because the Euglenozoa, Percolozoa, Tsukubea, and Jakobea are seen in this view as more basal eukaryotes. These four groups, are traditionally grouped together in the Discoba. However, the Discoba may well be paraphyletic as the neokaryotes may have emerged in them.

The group was recovered as a monophyletic group in a later analysis, by Al Jewari and Baldauf (2023).

== Taxonomy ==
A proposed cladogram is

- Eukaryota
  - Tsukubea
  - - Discicristata
      - Euglenozoa
      - Percolozoa
    - Orthokaryotes
      - Jakobea
      - Neokaryotes
        - Corticata/Diaphoretickes/ Bikont
          - Archaeplastida
          - Chromista
            - Hacrobia
            - SAR
        - Scotokaryotes/Opimoda/Neozoa
          - Metamonada
          - - Malawimonas
            - Sulcozoa/Podiata/ Sarcomastigota
              - CRuMs
              - Amorphea/ Unikont
                - Amoebozoa
                - Obazoa
                  - Breviata
                  - - Apusomonadida
                    - Opisthokonta
