= Pinjata =

Scientific classification
- Domain: Eukaryota
- Clade: Haptista
- Class: Centroplasthelida
- Order: Chthonida
- Family: Yogsothothidae
- Genus: Pinjata; Gerasimova, Shɨshkin & Zlatogursky 2019
- Species: P. ruminata

Binomial name
- Pinjata ruminata Gerasimova, Shɨshkin & Zlatogursky 2019

Genus of heliozoa

Pinjata is a genus of centrohelid amoebae. It contains one species, Pinjata ruminata, described in 2019 from brackish waters.
