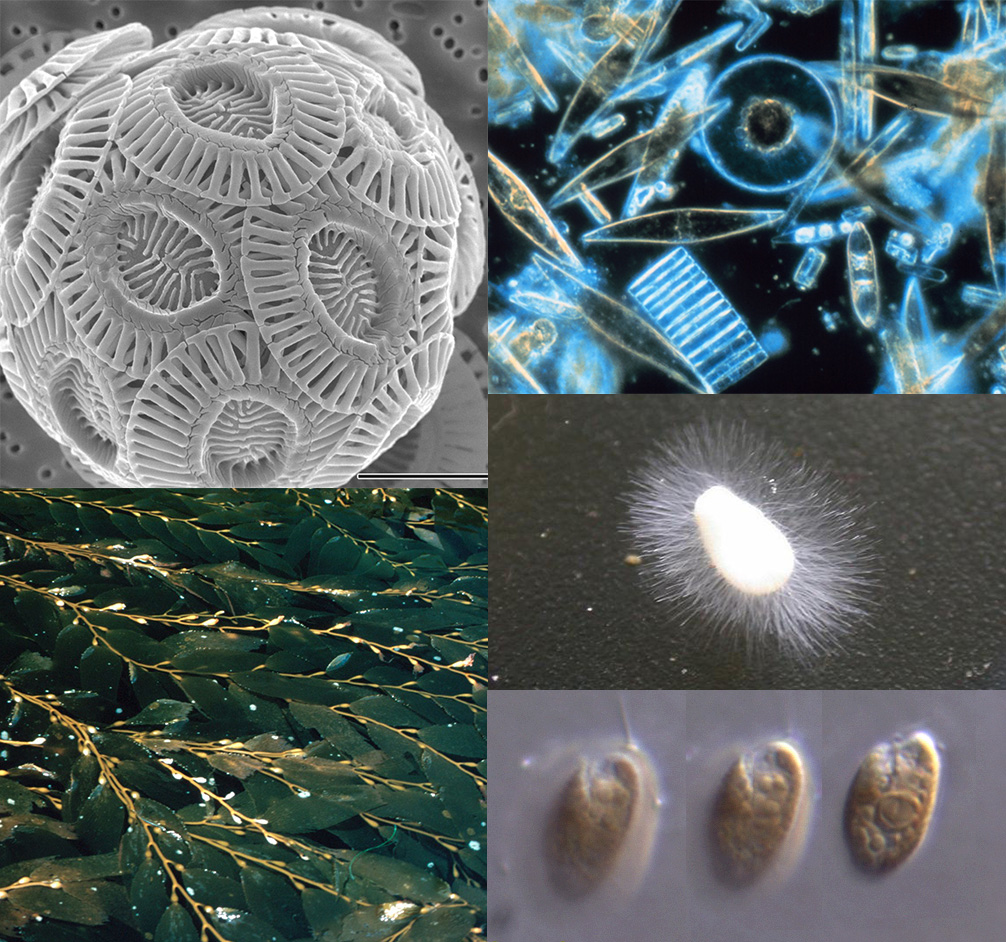
- Clockwise from top-left: a haptophyte (coccolithophore: Gephyrocapsa huxleyi), some diatoms, a water mold, a cryptomonad, and Macrocystis, a phaeophyte

Scientific classification (obsolete)
- Domain: Eukaryota
- Clade: Diaphoretickes
- (unranked): Chromalveolata; Adl et al. 2005

Subgroups
- Cryptophyta; Haptophyta; Halvaria; Stramenopiles; Alveolata

= Chromalveolata =

Group of eukaryotic organisms

Chromalveolata was a eukaryote supergroup present in a major classification of 2005, then regarded as one of the six major groups within the eukaryotes. It was a refinement of the kingdom Chromista, first proposed by Thomas Cavalier-Smith in 1981. Chromalveolata was proposed to represent the organisms descended from a single secondary endosymbiosis involving a red alga and a bikont. The plastids in these organisms are those that contain chlorophyll c.

However, the monophyly of the Chromalveolata has been rejected. Thus, two papers published in 2008 have phylogenetic trees in which the chromalveolates are split up, and recent studies continue to support this view.

== Groups and classification ==
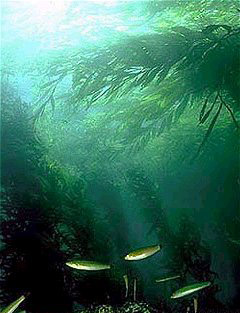
A Californian kelp forest

Historically, many chromalveolates were considered plants, because of their cell walls, photosynthetic ability, and in some cases their morphological resemblance to the land plants (Embryophyta). However, when the five-kingdom system (proposed in 1969) took prevalence over the animal–plant dichotomy, most of what we now call chromalveolates were put into the kingdom Protista, but the water molds and slime nets were put into the kingdom Fungi, while the brown algae stayed in the plant kingdom.

In 2005, in a classification reflecting the consensus at the time, the Chromalveolata were regarded as one of the six major clades of eukaryotes. The Chromalveolata were divided into four major subgroups:

- Cryptophyta
- Haptophyta
- Stramenopiles (or Heterokontophyta)
- Alveolata

Other groups that were thought to maybe included within, or related to, chromalveolates, are:

- Centrohelida
- Kathablepharidae
- Telonemia

Though several groups, such as the ciliates and the water molds, have lost the ability to photosynthesize, most are autotrophic. All photosynthetic chromalveolates use chlorophylls a and c, and many use accessory pigments. Chromalveolates share similar glyceraldehyde 3-phosphate dehydrogenase proteins.

However, as early as 2005, doubts were being expressed as to whether Chromalveolata was monophyletic, and a review in 2006 noted the lack of evidence for several of the supposed six major eukaryote groups, including the Chromalveolata. In 2012, consensus emerged that the group is not monophyletic. The four original subgroups fall into at least two categories: one comprises the Stramenopiles and the Alveolata, to which the Rhizaria are now usually added to form the SAR group; the other comprises the Cryptophyta and the Haptophyta. A 2010 paper splits the Cryptophyta and Haptophyta; the former are a sister group to the SAR group, the latter cluster with the Archaeplastida (plants in the broad sense). The katablepharids are closely related to the cryptophytes and the telonemids and centrohelids may be related to the haptophytes.

A variety of names have been used for different combinations of the groups formerly thought to make up the Chromalveolata.

- Halvaria: Analyses in 2007 and 2008 agreed that the Stramenopiles and the Alveolata were related, forming a reduced chromalveolate clade, called Halvaria.
- SAR group: The Rhizaria, which were not considered to be chromalveolates, belong with the Stramenopiles and Alveolata in many analyses, forming the SAR group, i.e. Halvaria plus Rhizaria.
- Hacrobia: The other two groups originally included in Chromalveolata, the Haptophyta and the Cryptophyta, were related in some analyses, forming a clade which has been called Hacrobia. Alternatively, the Hacrobia appeared to be more closely related to the Archaeplastida (plants in the very broad sense), being a sister group in one analysis, and actually nested inside this group in another. (Earlier, Cavalier-Smith had suggested a clade called Corticata for the grouping of all the chromalveolates and the Archaeplastida.) More recently, as noted above, Hacrobia has been split, with the Haptophyta being sister to the SAR group and the Cryptophyta instead related to the Archaeplastida.

== Morphology ==
Chromalveolates, unlike other groups with multicellular representatives, do not have very many common morphological characteristics. Each major subgroup has certain unique features, including the alveoli of the Alveolata, the haptonema of the Haptophyta, the ejectisome of the Cryptophyta, and the two different flagella of the Heterokontophyta. However, none of these features are present in all of the groups.

The only common chromalveolate features are these:

- The shared origin of chloroplasts, as mentioned above
- Presence of cellulose in most cell walls

Since this is such a diverse group, it is difficult to summarize shared chromalveolate characteristics.

== Ecological role ==
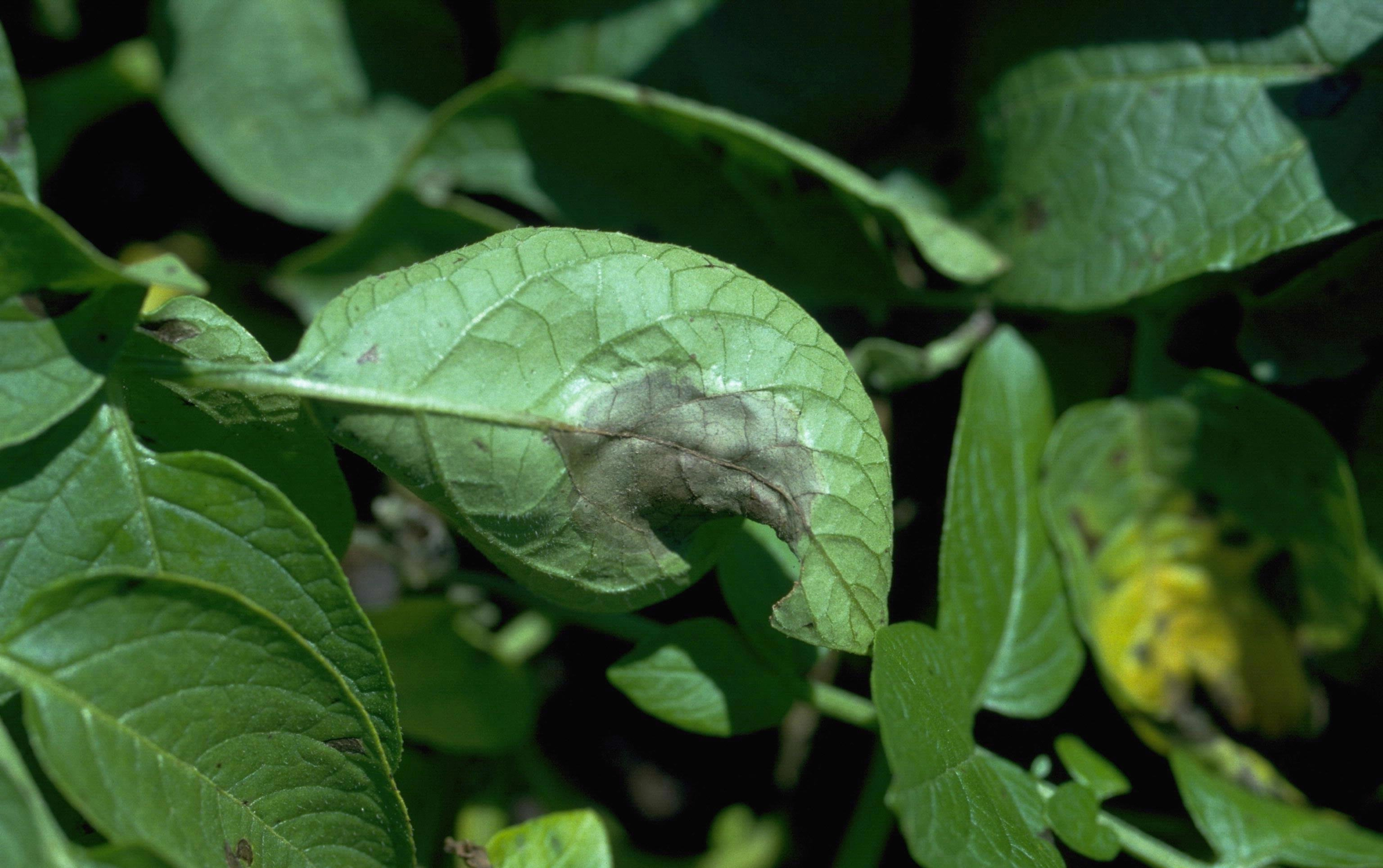
A potato plant infected with Phytophthora infestans

Many chromalveolates affect our ecosystem in enormous ways.

Some of these organisms can be very harmful. Dinoflagellates produce red tides, which can devastate fish populations and intoxicate oyster harvests. Apicomplexans are some of the most successful specific parasites to animals (including the genus Plasmodium, the malaria parasites). Water molds cause several plant diseases - it was the water mold Phytophthora infestans that caused the Irish potato blight that led to the Great Irish Famine.

However, many others are vital members of our ecosystem. Diatoms are one of the major photosynthetic producers, and as such produce much of the oxygen that we breathe, and also take in much of the carbon dioxide from the atmosphere. Brown algae, most specifically kelps, create underwater "forest" habitats for many marine creatures, and provide a large portion of the diet of coastal communities.

Chromalveolates also provide many products that we use. The algin in brown algae is used as a food thickener, most famously in ice cream. The siliceous shells of diatoms have many uses, such as in reflective paint, in toothpaste, or as a filter, in what is known as diatomaceous earth.

== Chromalveolate viruses ==
Like other organisms, chromalveolates have viruses. In the case of Gephyrocapsa huxleyi (a common algal bloom haptophyte), a virus believed to be specific to it causes mass death and the end of the bloom.

== See also ==
- Halvaria
