= Yogsothoth (protist) =

Scientific classification
- Domain: Eukaryota
- Class: Centroplasthelida
- Order: Chthonida
- Family: Yogsothothidae
- Genus: Yogsothoth; Shɨshkin & Zlatogursky, 2018

Type species
- Yogsothoth knorrus Shɨshkin & Zlatogursky, 2018

Species
- Y. knorrus; Y. carteri

Centrohelid algae

Yogsothoth is a genus of centrohelid protists, distinguished by the shape and arrangement of their external scales as well as their colonial life strategy. It was described in November 2018 by Shɨshkin and Zlatogursky, and is part of a newly described clade of centrohelids, determined as such by analysis of molecular data.

== Etymology ==
The genus name Yogsothoth is a reference to Yog-Sothoth, a character from H.P. Lovecraft's creative works. The genus was named as such due to its tendency to form colonies of cells with rounded plate-like outer scales and outwardly-radiating axopodia, which is visually similar to Lovecraft's description of Yog-sothoth as a conglomeration of glowing spheres.

== History of knowledge ==
Yogsothoth was first described by Shɨshkin and Zlatogursky in November 2018, and was placed within the taxon Panacanthocystidia after identifying that it had too few 18S insertions to be classified under the established taxon of Acanthocystidia.

=== Proposed taxonomy ===
Within the class of centrohelids, several descending taxa were described to place Yogsothoth, as it was genetically distinct from other centrohelids. The proposed taxonomy is as follows, with bolded classifications being described de novo:

- Domain Eukaryota
- Haptista
- Class Centroplasthelida
- **Panacanthocystidia**
- **Chthonida**
- **Yogsothothina**
- **Family Yogsothothidae**
- **Genus Yogsothoth**

== Habitat and ecology ==
Yogsothoth is a marine organism found at the shores of warm seas. Not much is known about its ecology. The closely related Raphidiophrys has similar axopodia extending from a scaled central cell, and can use them to prey on other organisms; it's likely that Yogsothoth is predatory as well, given that it is non-photosynthetic.

== Description ==
=== Cell morphology ===
Yogsothoth cells are round and range in size from 5.53 - 15.20 μm. Each cell is covered in silicaceous oval-shaped plate scales with an axial rib and an inflected margin; they are around 1.3μm x 1-3μm, with the length varying more by species. Each cell produces long axopodia, which extend outwards towards the surface of the colony (or away from the substrate, in the case of single cells) and are only produced on the outward-facing part of the cell surface. Kinetocysts move along the axopodia.

At the time of describing the type species Y. knorrus, a second species, Y. carteri, was also described. The two are mainly distinguished by the difference in appearance of their scales; compared to Y. knorrus, Y. carteri has larger, rounder, and deeper outer scales, and larger inner scales.

=== Colony morphology ===
Yogsothoth cells are almost always in colonies. Depending on the species, the colony can be spherical with 7-10 individual cells, or discoidal or globular with 2-32 individual cells. Unlike other colonial centrohelids, Yogsothoth has no cytoplasmic bridges between individual cells; each cell is completely individual, despite being densely packed into a round colony surrounded by its outer scales.

Further distinguishing them from other centrohelids, Yogsothoth produces two distinct types of scales. The colonies are surrounded by a dense layer of siliceous outer scales, the morphology of which vary by species but this outer layer is generally not seen in any other closely related taxon. The outer scales have an inward-furled margin, creating an inner cavity of varying depth. The cavity opening varies in shape and size. The back of each outer scale has an axial rib, similar to the inner scales. Conical papillae form irregular concentric rings on the outer surface of the scale, except for on the 'back' surface surrounding the axial rib.

The colonies are commonly motionless and attached to a substrate, but they are also capable of floating or active 'creeping' movement, which is unique among colonial centrohelids. The colonies divide by fragmentation, and the daughter colonies can remain fixed to the same substrate or float away, taking some amount of the mother colony's outer scales with it. They can also produce single cells which will split off from the colony.

=== Genetics ===
The 18S rRNA of Y. knorrus was sequenced and reconstructed to compare with other nearby taxa. This revealed clear relations to closely related taxa, especially Acanthocystidia and Raphidocystidae. These shared segments were designated as core genetic traits unique to the newly formed taxon Panacanthocystidia. Most of the common segments occurred in the variable expansion regions of the 18S rRNA sequence. The 18S rRNA also contained a unique substitution in an area that is overwhelmingly conserved among all eukaryotes. This substitution could theoretically result in a gene product with reduced function, as it would impact the ribosomal protein by encouraging folding in an unusual manner; however, the exact function of the gene and impact of this substitution is not confirmed.
