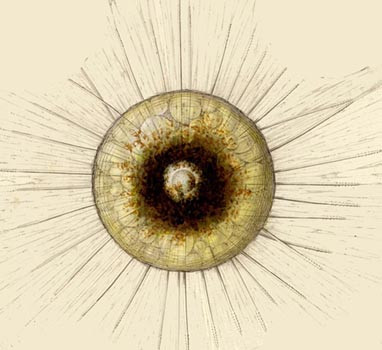
- A radiolarian (Aulacanthas)

Scientific classification
- Domain: Eukaryota
- (unranked): Orthokaryotes
- (unranked): Neokaryotes
- (unranked): Bikonta; Cavalier-Smith 1993

Subgroups
- Diaphoretickes; Excavata; Hemimastigophora

Synonyms
- Biciliata Cavalier-Smith, 1993; Diaphoretickes Adl et al., 2012; Diphoda Derelle et al., 2015

= Bikont =

Bikonts Temporal range: Mesoproterozoic – present

Group of eukaryotes

A bikont ("two flagella") is any of the eukaryotic organisms classified in the group Bikonta. Many single-celled and multi-celled organisms are members of the group, and these, as well as the presumed ancestor, have two flagella.

== Enzymes ==
Another shared trait of bikonts is the fusion of two genes into a single unit: the genes for thymidylate synthase (TS) and dihydrofolate reductase (DHFR) encode a single protein with two functions.

The genes are separately translated in unikonts.

== Relationships ==
Some research suggests that a unikont (a eukaryotic cell with a single flagellum) was the ancestor of opisthokonts (animals, fungi, and related forms) and Amoebozoa, and a bikont was the ancestor of Archaeplastida (plants and relatives), Excavata, Rhizaria, and Chromalveolata. Cavalier-Smith has suggested that Apusozoa, which are typically considered incertae sedis, are in fact bikonts.

Relationships within the bikonts are not yet clear. Cavalier-Smith has grouped the Excavata and Rhizaria into the Cabozoa and the Archaeplastida and Chromalveolata into the Corticata, but at least one other study has suggested that the Rhizaria and Chromalveolata form a clade.

An alternative to the Unikont–Bikont division was suggested by Derelle et al. in 2015, where they proposed the acronyms Opimoda–Diphoda respectively, as substitutes to the older terms. The name Diphoda is formed from the letters of DIscoba and diaPHOretickes (shown in capitals). [suggested singular forms are Opneme-Dipheme respectively]

== Cladogram ==
A "classical" cladogram (data from 2012, 2015) is:

- Eukaryotes
  - Bikonta
    - SAR/HA Supergroup
      - - Archaeplastida (inc. land plants)
        - Cryptophyta
      - - Haptophyta
        - SAR supergroup
          - Rhizaria
          - Halvaria
            - Heterokont
            - Alveolata
    - Excavata
    - Unikonta

However, a cladogram (data from 2015, 2016) with the root in Excavata is

- Eukaryotes
  - Diphoda (Bikonts)
    - SAR/HA Supergroup
      - Archaeplastida (inc. land plants)
      - Chromista
        - Hacrobia
          - Cryptista
          - Haptista
        - SAR supergroup
          - Rhizaria
          - Halvaria
            - Heterokonta
            - Alveolata
    - Discoba
  - Metamonada?
  - Opimoda (Unikonts)
    - Metamonada?
    - podiates
      - Neolouka
      - Collodictyon
      - - Varisulca
        - - Amoebozoa
          - Obazoa
            - - Apusomonadida
              - Breviata
            - Opisthokonta

The corticates correspond roughly to the bikonts. While Haptophyta, Cryptophyta, Glaucophyta, Rhodophyta, the SAR supergroup and Viridiplantae are usually considered monophyletic, Archaeplastida may be paraphyletic, and the mutual relationships between these phyla are still to be fully resolved.

Recent reconstructions placed Archaeplastida and Hacrobia together in an "HA supergroup" or "AH supergroup", which was a sister clade to the SAR supergroup within the SAR/HA supergroup. However, this seems to have fallen out of favor as the monophyly of hacrobia has come under dispute.

== See also ==
- Corticata
