= Cabozoa =

Scientific classification
- Domain: Eukaryota
- (unranked): Bikonta
- Clade: Cabozoa; Cavalier-Smith 1999

Subdivisions
- Excavata; Rhizaria

Former proposed clade

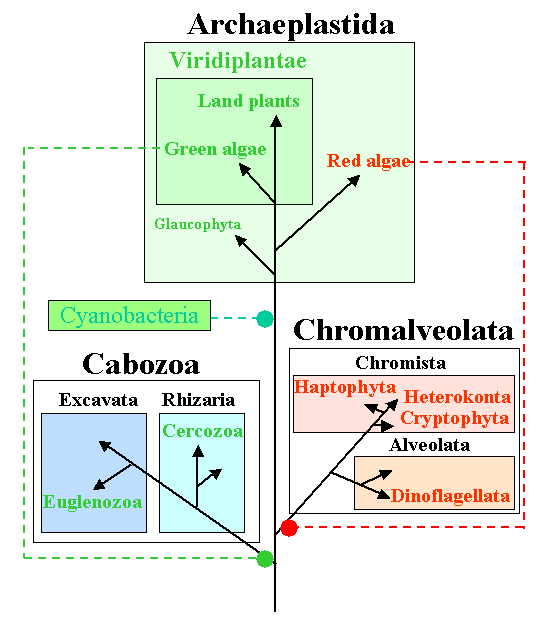
Evolution of the algae, as depicted by Thomas Cavalier-Smith in 2002. Neither the tree's structure nor some of the terms in the diagram reflect a modern consensus.

In the classification of eukaryotes (living organisms with a cell nucleus), Cabozoa was a taxon proposed by Cavalier-Smith. It was a putative clade comprising the Rhizaria and Excavata. More recent research places the Rhizaria with the Alveolata and Stramenopiles instead of the Excavata, however, so "Cabozoa" is polyphyletic.

== See also ==
- Corticata
