= Oxnerella =

Scientific classification
- Domain: Eukaryota
- Phylum: Haptista
- Class: Centroplasthelida
- Order: Pterocystida
- Family: Oxnerellidae; Cavalier-Smith & Chao 2012
- Genus: Oxnerella; Dobell 1917

Type species
- Oxnerella maritima Dobell 1917

Genus of single-celled organisms

Oxnerella is a genus of centrohelids.

It includes the species Oxnerella maritima.
