= Meringosphaera =

Scientific classification
- Domain: Eukaryota
- Class: Centrohelida
- Genus: Meringosphaera Lohmann, 1902

Genus of centrohelids

Meringosphaera is a genus of protists belonging to the centrohelids.

The species of this genus are reported to have worldwide distribution including in Eurasia, Africa and Northern America.

Meringosphaera belongs to centrohelids it has been considered heterotrophic eukaryotes. Previous descriptions of the genus have described the cells as containing "golden green" bodies which has raised speculations regarding having a potential plastid. In 2023 it was confirmed that Meringosphaera has either permanent or semi-permanent plastids despite its position within a class of heterotrophic eukaryotes.

In 2026 reseachers showed that Meringosphaera likely is compromised of several extant lineages, with varying plastid status. The plastid-bearing lineages has been shown to have permanent plastids originating from the green algae Dictyochophyceae. The plastids and Meringosphaera lineages also show mirroring evolutionary patterns which could be an indicator of co-evolution. Those Meringosphaera groups have thus been confirmed to be newly found algae lineages and a result of horizontal plastid acquisition.

Species:

- Meringosphaera aculeata Pascher
- Meringosphaera mediterranea Lohmann
- Meringosphaera spinosa Prescott
- Meringosphaera tenerrima Schiller
