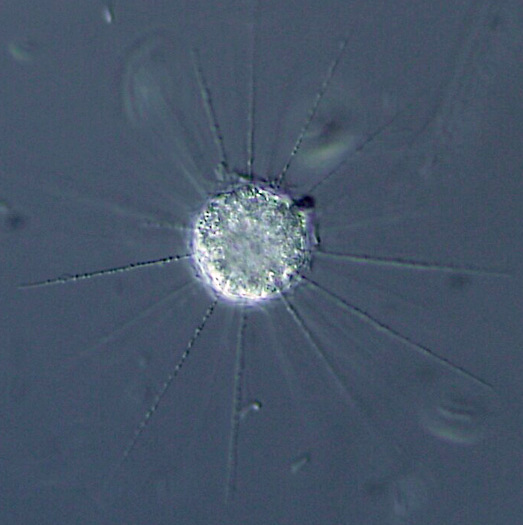
- Raphidiophrys contractilis

Scientific classification
- Domain: Eukaryota
- Class: Centrohelida
- Order: Acanthocystida
- Suborder: Chalarothoracina
- Family: Raphidiophryidae Mikrjukov, 1996

Genera
- Raphidiophrys; Polyplacocystis

= Raphidiophryidae =

Family of single-celled organisms

Raphidiophryidae is a family of mostly freshwater centrohelids. It is the sister family of Acanthocystidae, sharing the trait of presenting silica scales and comprising the clade Chalarothoracina. Two genera, Raphidiophrys and Polyplacocystis, have been discovered so far.
