= Yogsothothidae =

Scientific classification
- Domain: Eukaryota
- Class: Centroplasthelida
- Superorder: Panacanthocystida
- Order: Chthonida; Shɨshkin & Zlatogursky 2018
- Suborder: Yogsothothina; Shɨshkin & Zlatogursky 2018
- Family: Yogsothothidae; Shɨshkin & Zlatogursky 2018

Genera
- Yogsothoth; Pinjata

Family of amoebae

Yogsothothidae is a family of centrohelid amoebae. It contains two genera: Yogsothoth, with two species, Y. knorrus and Y. carteri, and Pinjata, with a single species P. ruminata.
