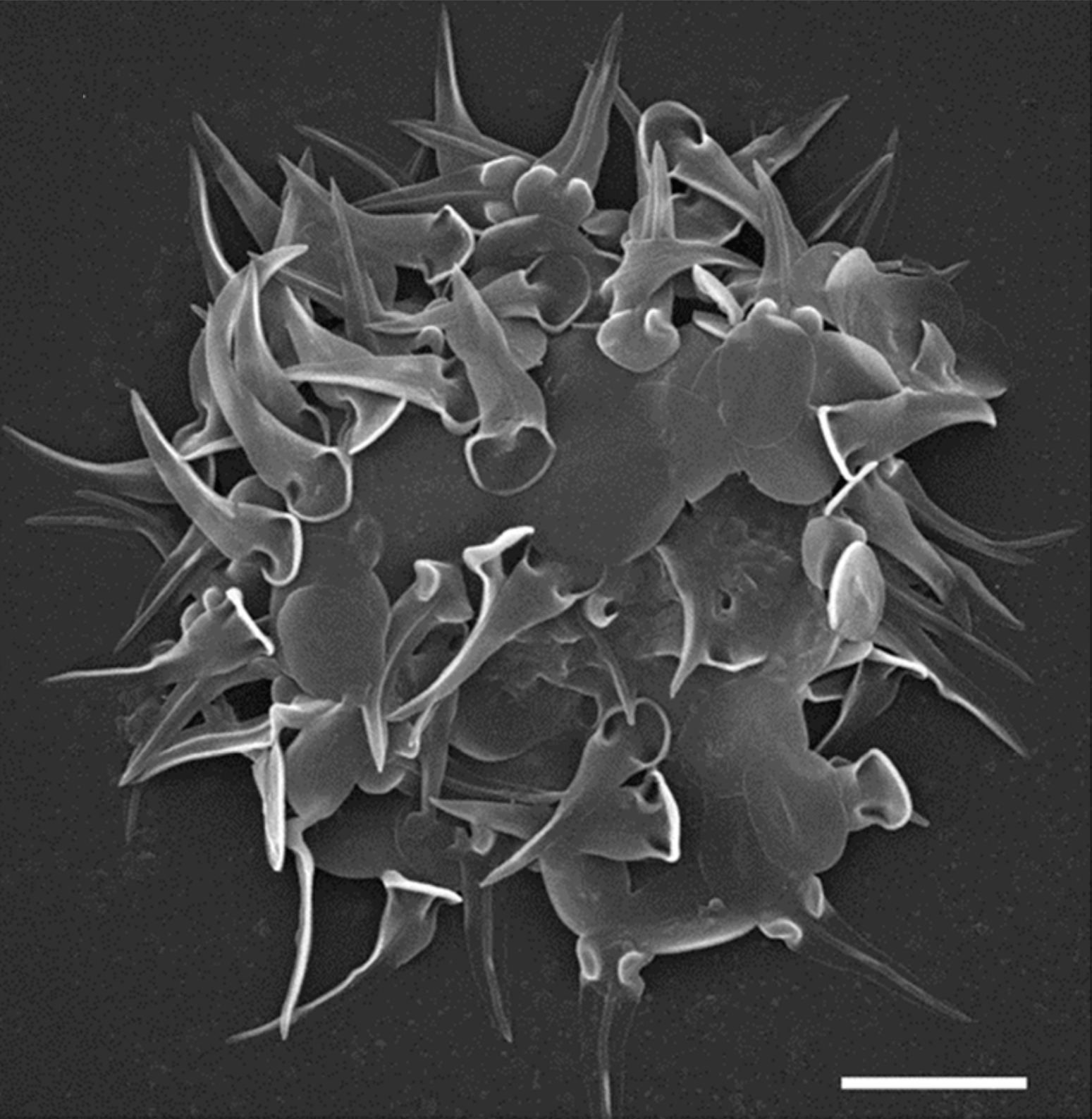
- Dried T. lacunata cell (strain HF-25) under scanning electron microscopy. Scale bar: 2 μm.

Scientific classification
- Domain: Eukaryota
- Supergroup: Haptista
- Class: Centroplasthelida
- Order: Pterista
- Family: Pterocystidae
- Genus: Triangulopteris; Zagumyonnyi, Radaykina & Tikhonenkov 2021
- Species: T. lacunata

Binomial name
- Triangulopteris lacunata Zagumyonnyi, Radaykina & Tikhonenkov 2021

= Triangulopteris =

Genus of soil amoebae

Triangulopteris is a genus of centrohelids, single-celled amoebae that are generally covered with scales or spicules. It contains one species, Triangulopteris lacunata (from Latin lacuna 'hole'), which was described in 2021 from soil samples obtained across geographically distant Ukrainian and Russian territories. This species is one of the few representatives of centrohelids in poorly studied soil microbial ecosystems. The type strain, HF-25, was isolated from permafrost.

Triangulopteris lacunata cells are usually covered by two kinds of silica scales: plates cales and spine scales. The organism is distinguished from other centrohelids by the appearance of its spine scales, which are composed of a basal plate from which a thin shaft emerges, surrounded by two lateral wings. Their unique characteristic consists of two 'pockets' formed between the wings and the basal plate, which has not been observed in any other centrohelid. After several years, the type strain was reported to lose its normal scales and developed thin organic spicules instead, a phenomenon reported in a few other centrohelids.

== Etymology ==
The authors stated that the name Triangulopteris is derived from Latin triangulus, meaning triangular, and from Greek πτερόν, meaning wing, due to the triangular shape of the spine scales surrounding the cell. The specific epithet lacunata, from Latin lacuna meaning hole, fossa, refers to the two 'pockets' formed between the lateral wings and the basal plates of the scales.

== Description ==
Triangulopteris lacunata is a species of centrohelid heliozoans, a group of free-living amoeboid protists that have narrow pseudopodia (axopodia) and are often covered with scales or spicules of different shapes. The cells of the type strain of T. lacunata range from 4.3–8.5 μm in diameter when starved, to 7.23–16.3 μm when well-fed. The length of their axopodia is 5.2–12.7 μm when starved, and 10.9–28.4 μm when well-fed. The axopodia bear kinetocysts, a type of complex extrusomes present in centrohelids and other heliozoa. They do not form colonies, but can form cysts under low nutrition conditions, measuring 5.9–7.3 μm in diameter.

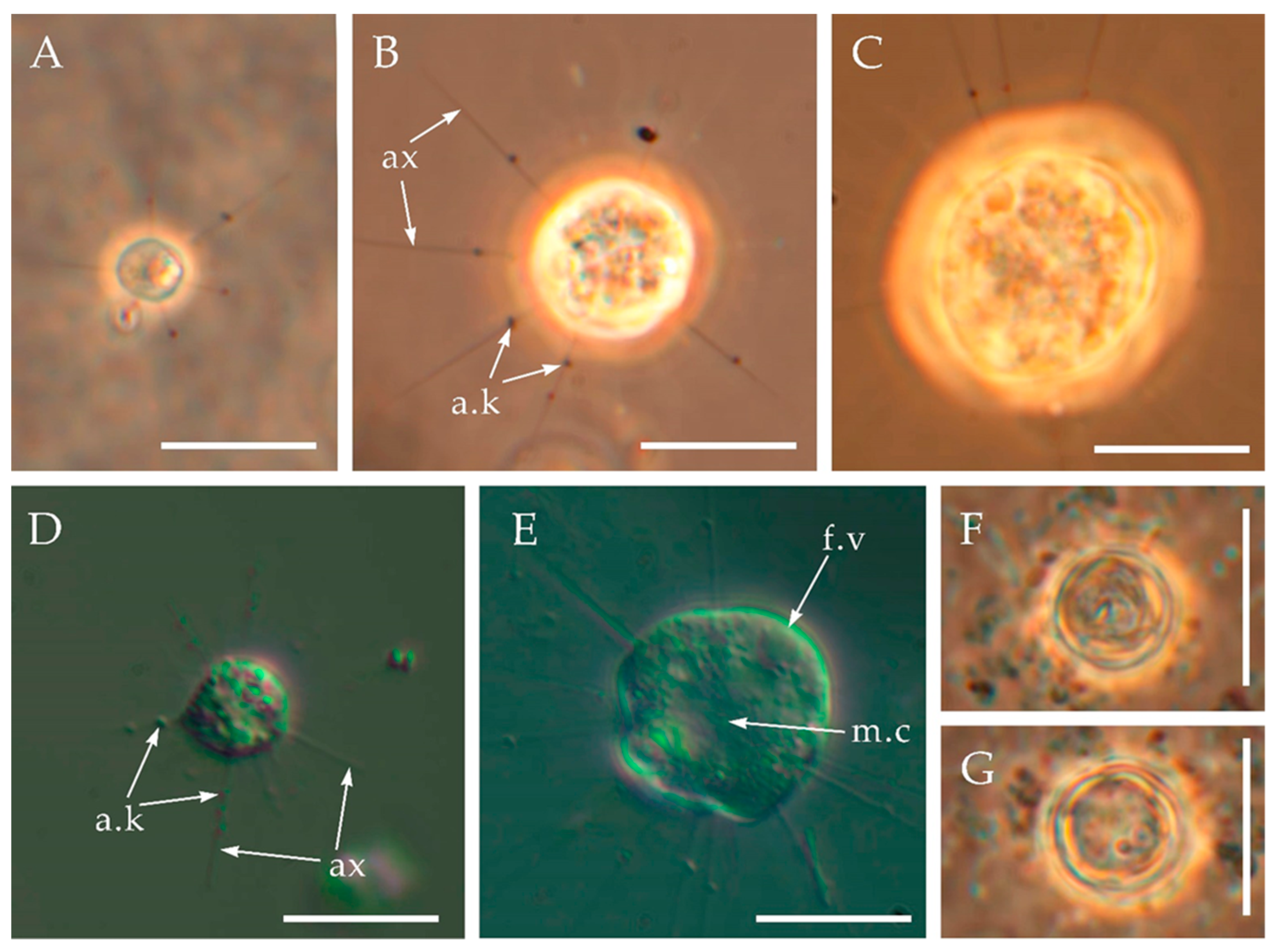
Light microscopy images of T. lacunata (strain HF-25) after losing silica scales, showing kinetocysts (a.k), axopodia (ax), food vacuoles (f.v), and the microtubule organizing center (m.c). A,D: starving cells. B,C,E: well-fed cells. F,G: cysts. Scale bars: 10 μm.

Cells of T. lacunata are covered with two types of siliceous scales: plate scales and spine scales. Spine scales are 1.06–3.33 μm long and triangular in shape, slightly curved, consisting of a shaft (0.08–0.12 μm wide) tapering to a sharp apex, a unique hoof-shaped basal plate (0.60–0.92 μm in diameter) with a small marginal rim (0.06–0.09 μm wide), and lateral wings emerging from the basal plate and tapering to the shaft apex. Two small 'pockets' (each 0.14–0.36 by 0.07–0.13 μm in size, and 0.14–0.36 μm deep) are formed where the lateral wings meet the basal plate. Radial ribs appear on the surface of the plate and wings. Plate scales are oval, measuring 1.25–2.05 by 0.86–1.93 μm. They have a narrow thickening in the middle that measures 0.47–1.05 μm by 0.060–0.116 μm. The spine scales are unique to T. lacunata; the closest resemblance is Raineriophrys scaposa, which has basal plates and lateral wings of similar size and shape, but it lacks the 'pockets', and ribs have not been reported.

After several years of cultivation, the type strain lost its scales and instead developed a spicule-bearing stage, with irregularly placed needle-like organic spicules covering the entire cell surface, measuring 1.85–3.64 μm in length and 0.035–0.056 μm in width. This is the third known case of silica scales being replaced to spicules among centrohelids; changes in the type of scales has also been reported in Raphidocystis glabra and Raphidiophrys heterophryoidea.

Electron microscopy images of dried Triangulopteris lacunata cells

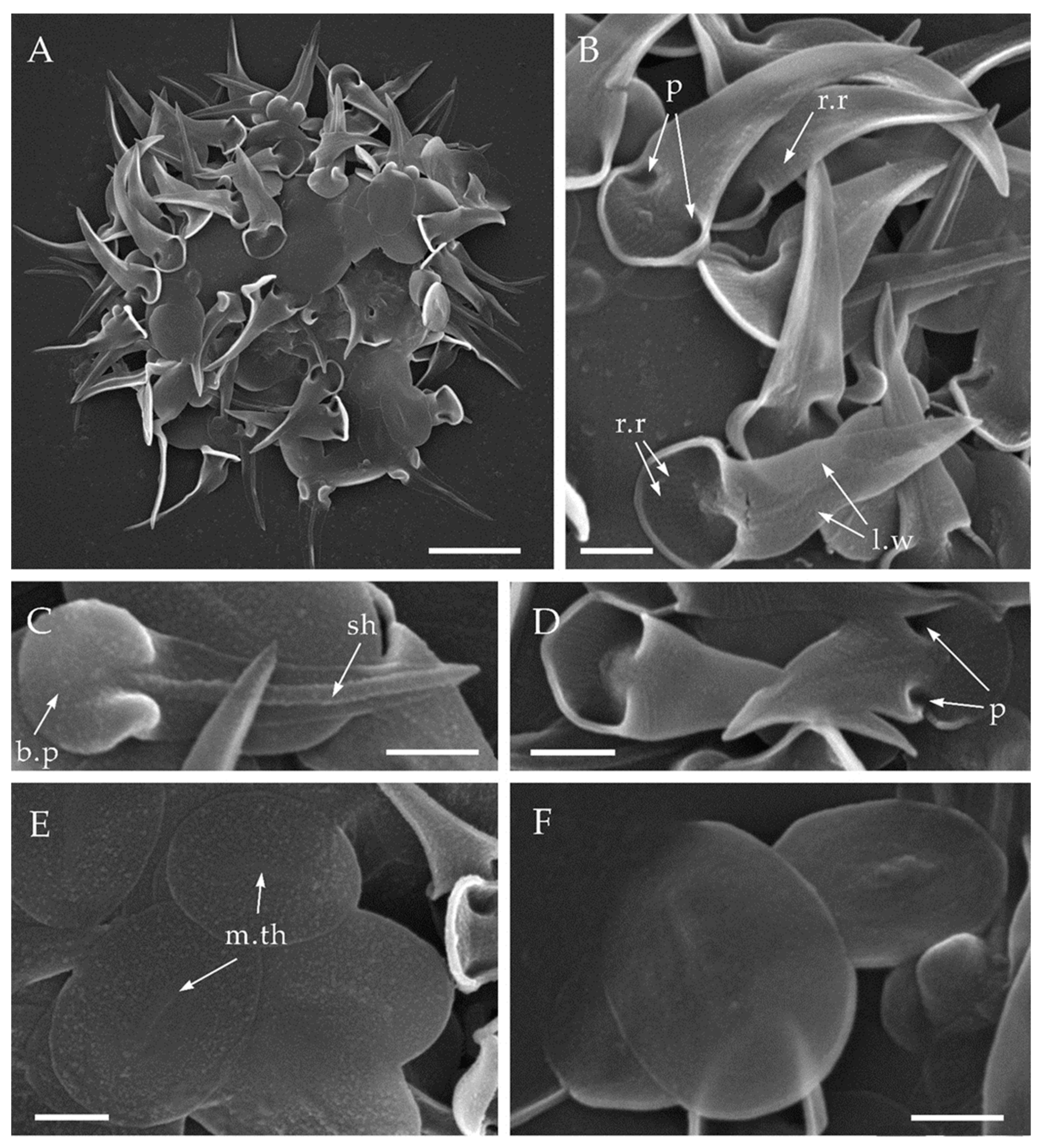
Scale-bearing stage under scanning electron microscopy. Each scale comprises a basal plate (b.p) with medial thickening (m.th) and radial ribs (r.r), two lateral wings (l.w) with pockets (p), and a central shaft (sh). Scale bars: 2 μm (A), 0.5 μm (B–F).

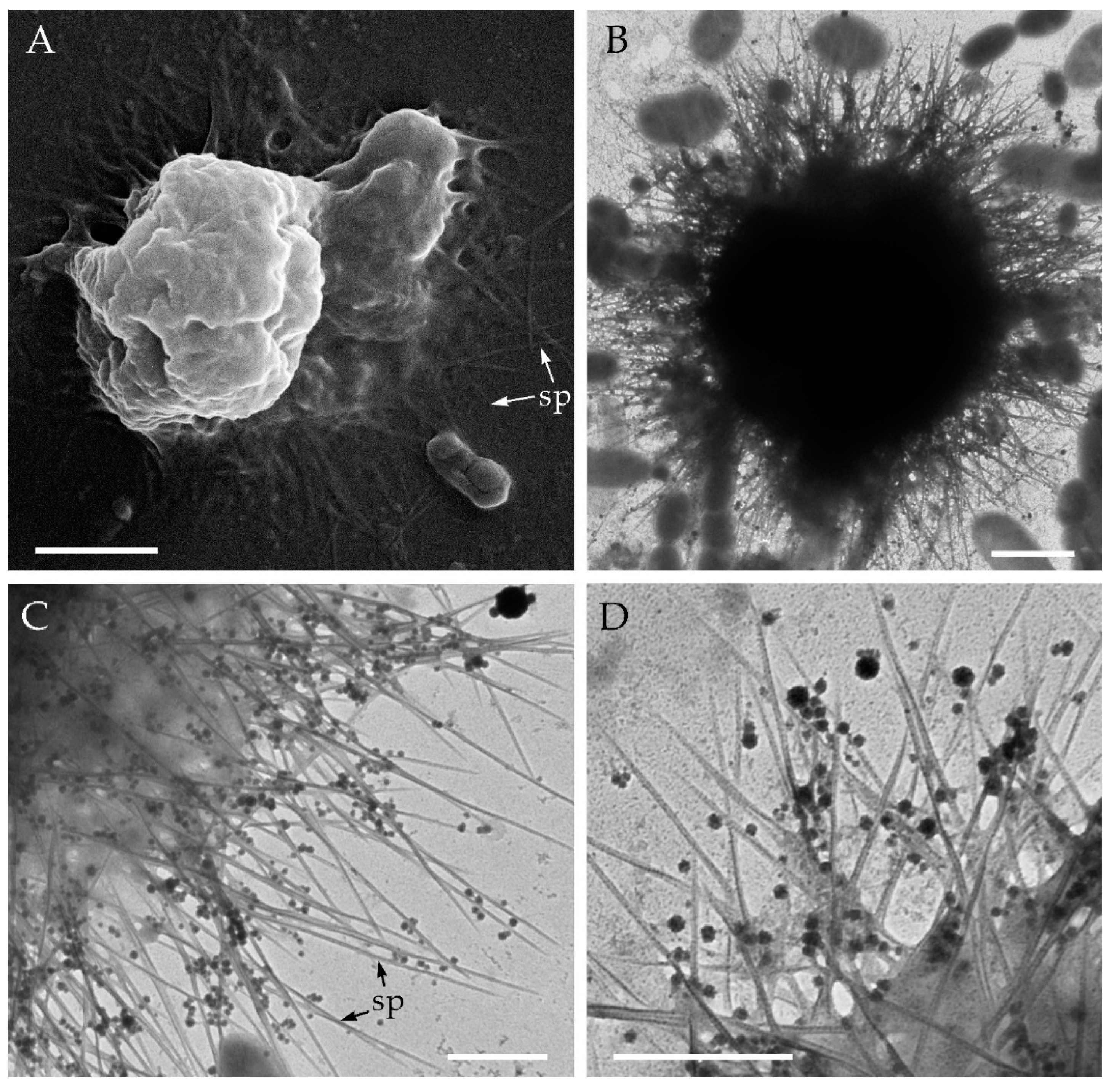
Spicules-bearing stage under scanning (A) and transmission electron microscopy (B–D). Thin spicules (sp) appear on the peripheral part of the cells. Scale bars: 5 μm (A,B), 1 μm (C,D).

== Nutrition ==
Triangulopteris lacunata, like other centrohelids, is a heterotroph that consumes other eukaryotes. Its cells have been cultivated with prey cultures of Parabodo caudatus and Bodo saltans, growing in mineral water.

== Taxonomy ==
Sampling locations of T. lacunata. 1: Syuryu-Kaya Mt., Crimea. 2: Pesiv island, Dnieper Lowland, East European Plain. 3: Champ Island, Franz Joseph Land archipelago, Arctic Ocean. 4: Bolshaya Chukochya river, Kolyma Lowland, North-Eastern Siberia.

Triangulopteris lacunata was described by Russian protistologists Dmitry G. Zagumyonnyi, Liudmila V. Radaykina, and Denis V. Tikhonenkov. Cells of this organism were isolated from soil samples obtained from four geographically distant biotopes within the territories of Ukraine and Russia, namely: dry stream soil of Syuryu-Kaya Mt., Crimea; soil and leaf litter on Pesiv Island, on the Dnieper river; moss with sand on the polar desert of Champ Island, Franz Josef Land archipelago; and permafrost of Kolyma Lowland. The skeletal elements of cells from all four locations resembled one another. The cells from Kolyma Lowland were assigned as the type strain, named HF-25.

A phylogenetic analysis using the SSU rRNA gene revealed that strain HF-25 belongs to the centrohelid clade Pterista, as the sister clade to the H2 clade, which is composed of only freshwater environmental DNA sequences from remote locations (Botswana, New Zealand and Singapore). Due to the unique morphology of the scales and the genetic distance from other centrohelids, the authors established a new genus and species for strain HF-25. They assigned this genus to the family Pterocystidae, which is paraphyletic. In 2024, another SSU rRNA gene phylogenetic analysis revealed that Triangulopteris is most closely related to a clade containing two species of the polyphyletic genus Pterocystis, namely P. polycristalepis and P. striata, known as clade Pterocystidae D.

== Biogeography ==
Triangulopteris lacunata was found in soil samples from geographically distant biotopes, implying a wide distribution, but it has never been found in freshwater bodies. It is considered a representative of soil microbial ecosystems, which remain poorly explored. Although there is little information about centrohelids in soil samples, environmental DNA studies recover twice as many operational taxonomic units assigned to centrohelids in soil compared to freshwater biotopes. The type strain HF-25 is the second case of centrohelids recovered from permafrost conditions.
