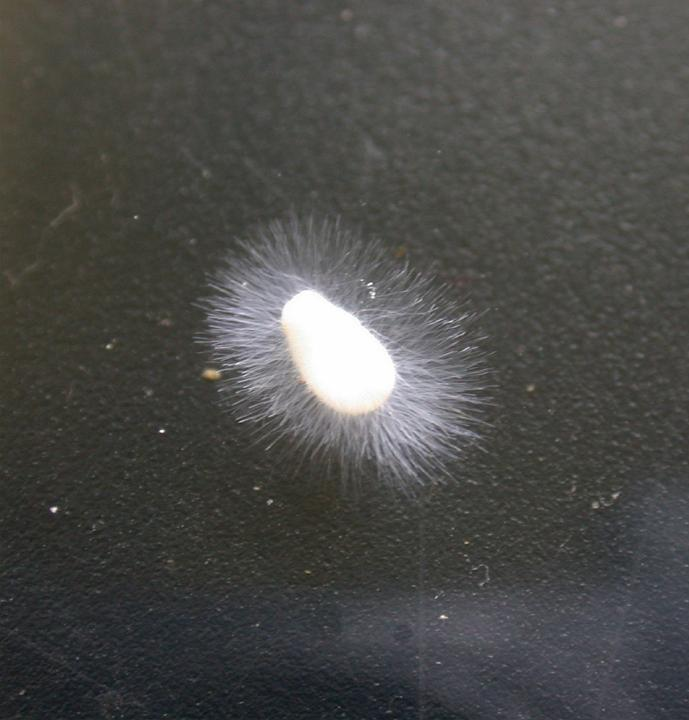
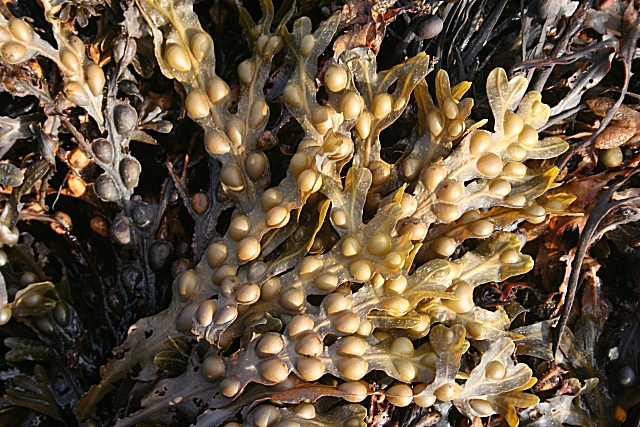
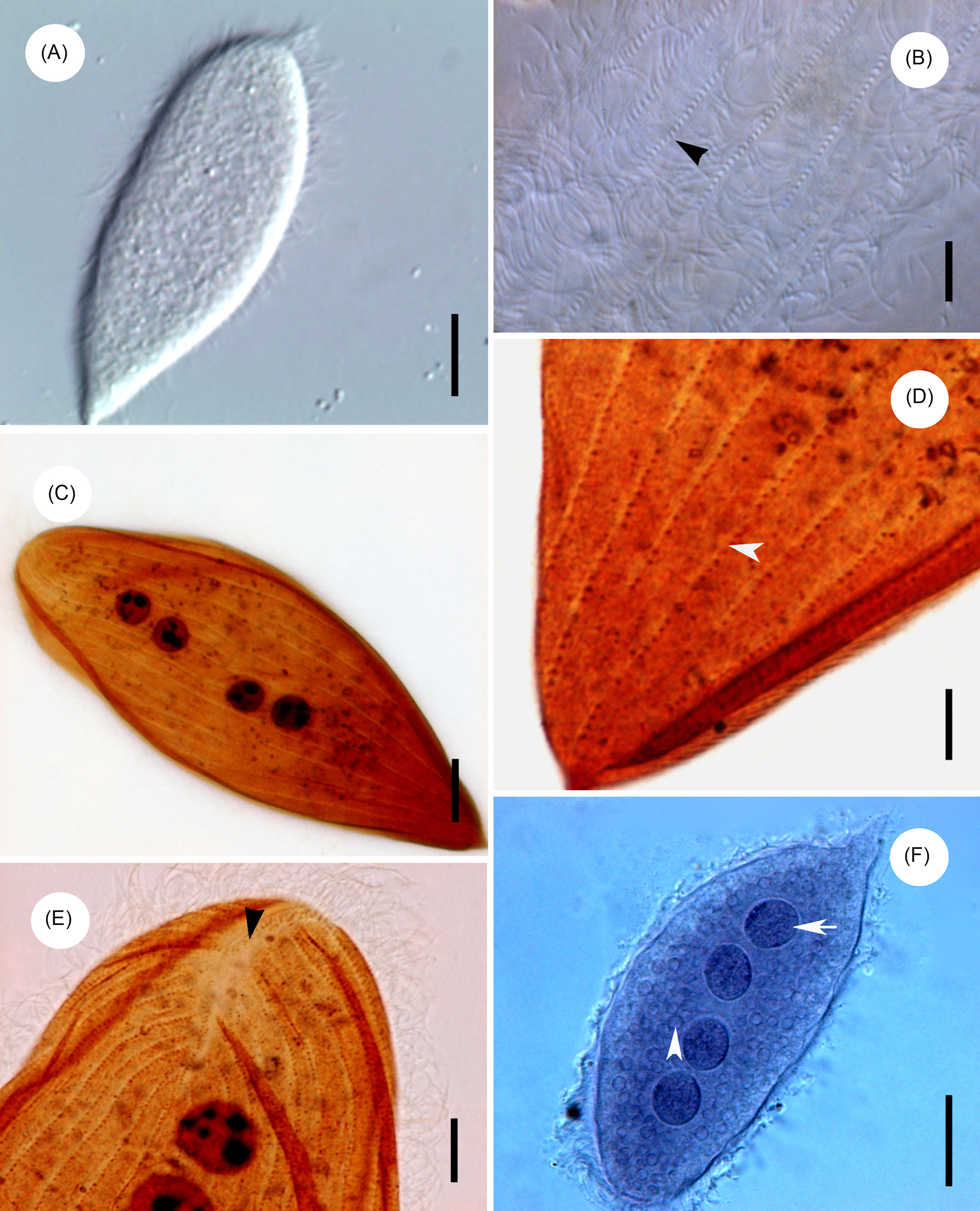
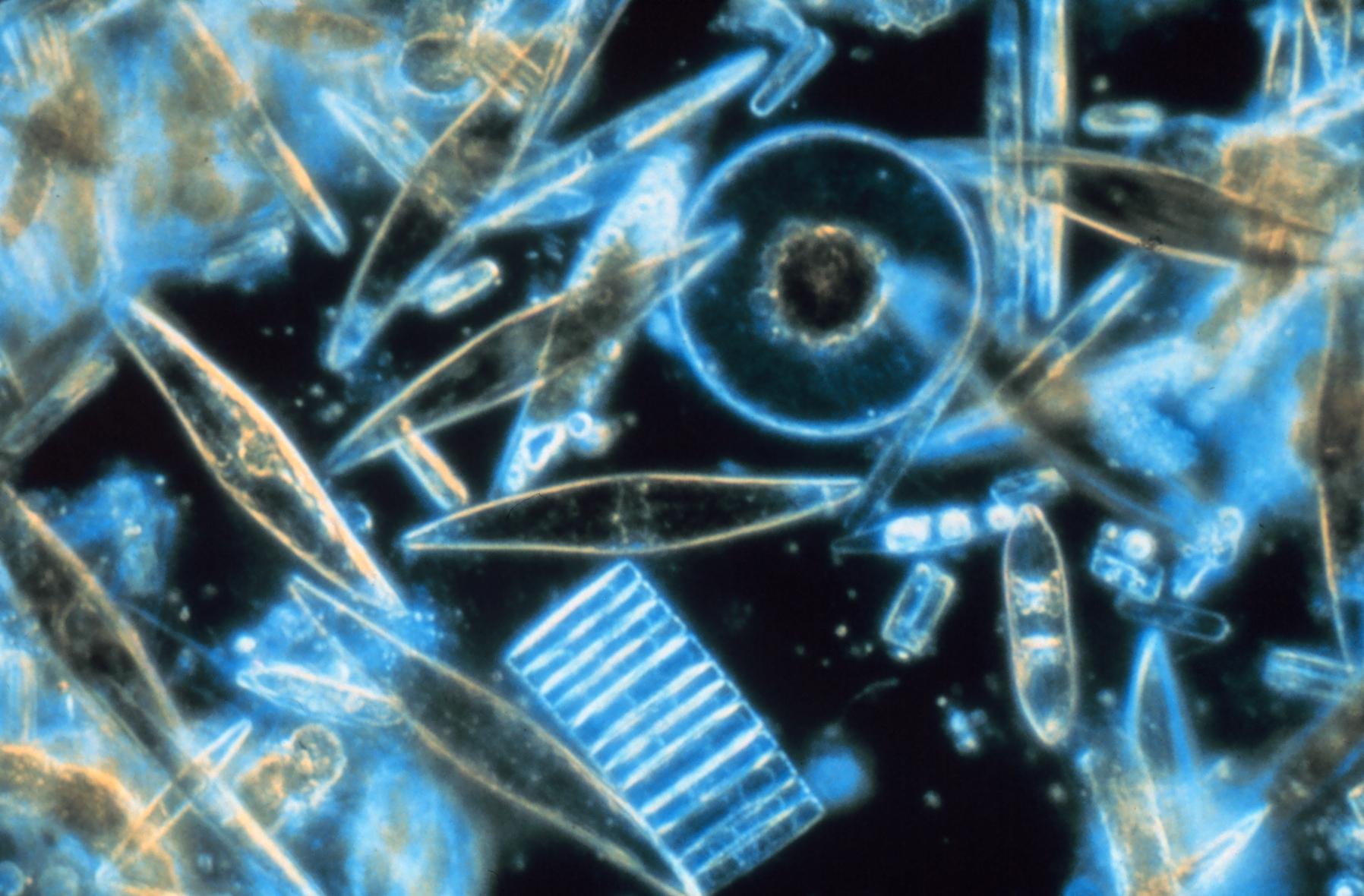
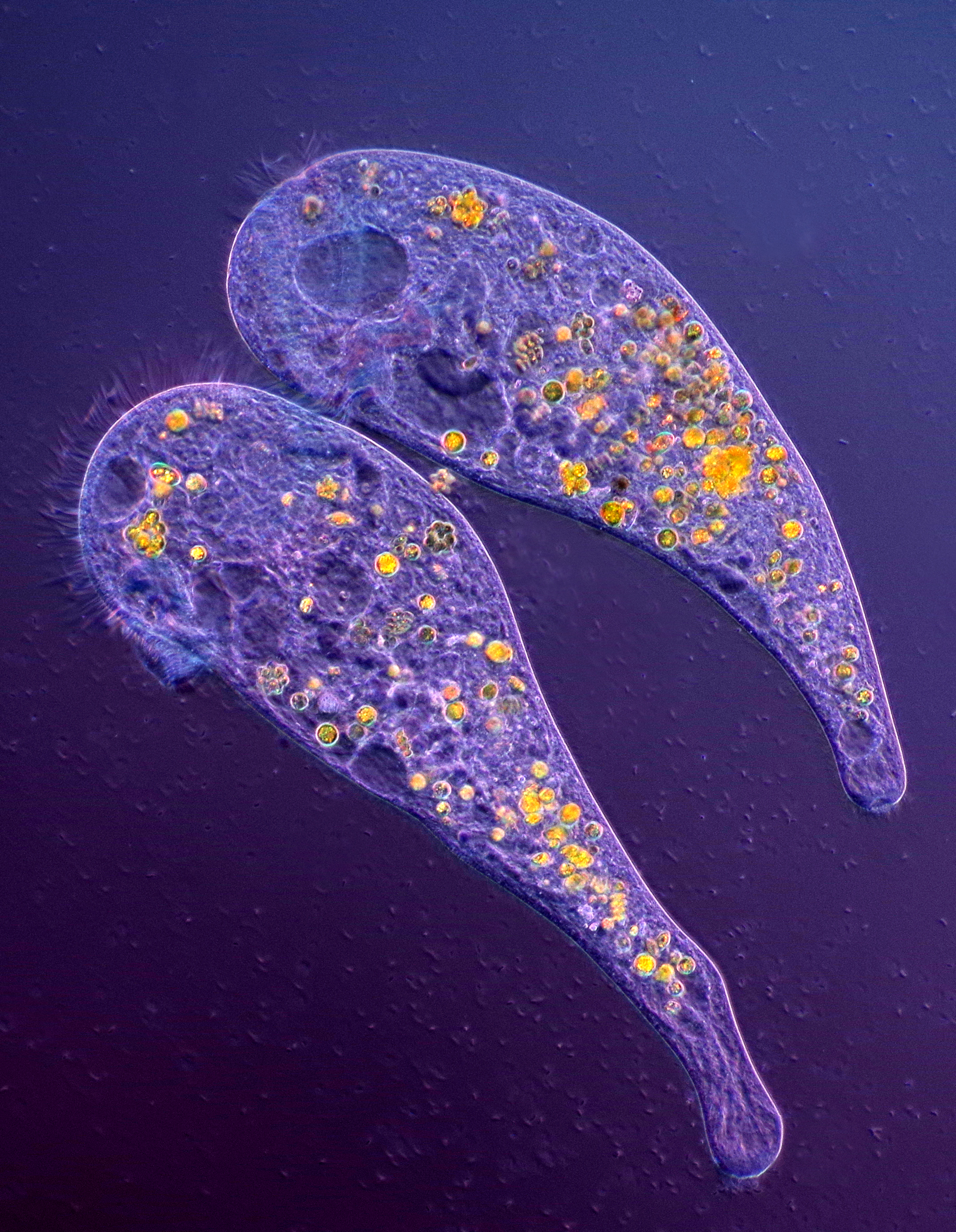
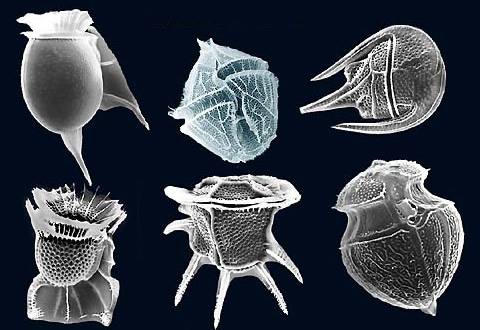
- Important halvarian groups. Clockwise from top-left: a water mold (Oomycetes), a brown alga (Phaeophyta), some diatoms (Bacillariophyta), some dinoflagellates (Miozoa), some ciliates (Ciliophora) and an opalinid (Bigyra).

Scientific classification
- Domain: Eukaryota
- Clade: Sar
- Clade: Halvaria; Cavalier-Smith 2010

Subgroups
- Stramenopiles (Heterokonta); Alveolata

= Halvaria =

Clade of protists

Halvaria is a taxonomic grouping of protists that includes Alveolata and Stramenopiles (Heterokonta).

Analyses in 2007 and 2008 revealed that the Stramenopiles and the Alveolata are related, and form a reduced clade of what were seen to be a paraphyletic group, the chromalveolates. The two clades together with the Rhizaria (originally one of the six major eukaryote groups) form a clade dubbed the SAR supergroup.

A phylogenomic analysis from 2016 cast doubt on Halvaria, suggesting that Alveolata is the sister group to Rhizaria (making the R + A clade) through new rhizarian sequence data, and that support for Halvaria might be an artifact of low taxon sampling as well as long branch attraction.

However, later analyses from 2021 support Halvaria as a solid clade.

- SAR
  - Rhizaria
  - Halvaria
    - Stramenopiles
    - Alveolata
