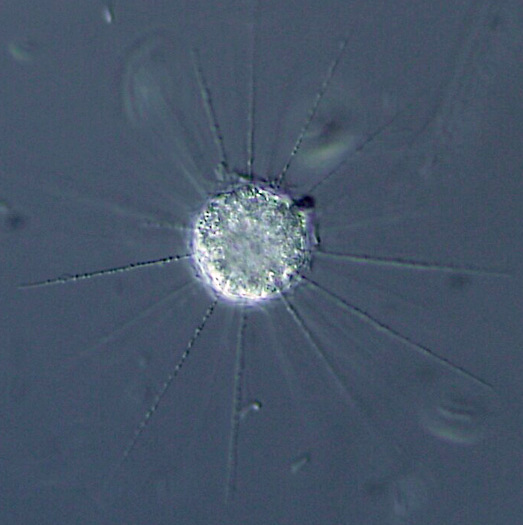
- Raphidiophrys contractilis

Scientific classification
- Domain: Eukaryota
- Clade: Haptista
- Class: Centroplasthelida
- Order: Raphidista
- Family: Raphidiophryidae
- Genus: Raphidiophrys
- Species: R. contractilis

Binomial name
- Raphidiophrys contractilis Kinoshita, Suzaki, Shigenaka & Sugiyama, 1995

= Raphidiophrys contractilis =

Species of single-celled organism

Raphidiophrys contractilis is a species of freshwater centrohelid.

== Discovery ==
This species was first isolated from a brackish pond in Shukkeien Garden, Naka-ku, Hiroshima City, Japan.

== Description ==
Raphidiophrys contractilis is a spherical organism measuring between 7 and 19 μm in diameter and has several axopodia measuring between 60 and 110 μm. The axopodia are sustained by a set of microtubules arranged in a complex of hexagons and triangles. The cell body is coated by a thin layer of small scales composed of silica. These scales are oblong, with curved edges and with the surface always facing the cell body.

== Feeding behavior ==
Raphidiophrys contractilis preys on other protists, such as flagellates and ciliates, and captures them with its axopodia. The axopodia contain many organelles called kinetocysts, which are released on the prey's surface and probably have a paralyzing effect. After the prey is attached to the axopodium, the axopodium contracts rapidly, at a velocity of about 1 mm/s, this being the reason for the species being named Raphidiophrys contractilis.

Although R. contractilis is not a colonial species, several individuals can cooperate in the capture of larger prey. In this case, the individuals gather around the prey and fuse into a larger structure with partially joined cytoplasms and build a common food vacuole to ingest and digest the prey organism.
