= Scotokaryotes =

Scientific classification
- Domain: Eukaryota
- (unranked): Neokaryotes
- (unranked): Scotokaryotes; Cavalier-Smith, 1999

Clades
- Loukozoa; Podiata

Synonyms
- Opimoda Derelle et al., 2015; Neozoa

Theoretical clade in the Eukaryota taxonomical domain

The Scotokaryotes is a proposed basal eukaryote clade sister to Diaphoretickes. Likely Scotokaryote groupings include the Metamonads, the Malawimonas and the Podiata. The name comes from the Greek word scotos (dark) due to the complete absence of photosynthetic organisms in this clade, contrasting with Diaphoretickes and Excavata.

An alternative to the Unikont–Bikont division was suggested by Derelle et al. in 2015, where they proposed the acronyms Opimoda–Diphoda respectively, as substitutes to the older terms (Opimoda includes the old 'unikonts', plus some former bikonts; Diphoda includes most of the old 'bikonts', but not all). The name Opimoda is formed from the letters (shown in capitals) of OPIsthokonta and aMOebozoa.

Sarcomastigota Cavalier-Smith, 1983 is a proposed subkingdom (believed to be paraphyletic) that includes all members of Opimoda that are not animals or fungi. Sulcozoa Cavalier-Smith, 2012 is a proposed phylum (believed to be paraphyletic) within Sarcomastigota that does not include the phyla Amoebozoa (clade) and Choanozoa (paraphyletic), i.e. it includes the proposed subphyla Apusozoa and Varisulca.

== Phylogeny ==
A cladogram proposed in 2025 is

- Eukaryota
  - Metamonada
  - - Diphoda
      - Discoba
      - Diaphoretickes
    - Opimoda
      - - Ancyromonadida
        - Malawimonadida
      - Podiata
        - CRuMs
        - Amorphea
          - Amoebozoa
          - Obazoa
            - Breviatea
            - - Opisthokonta
              - Apusomonadida

== See also ==
- Diphoda
