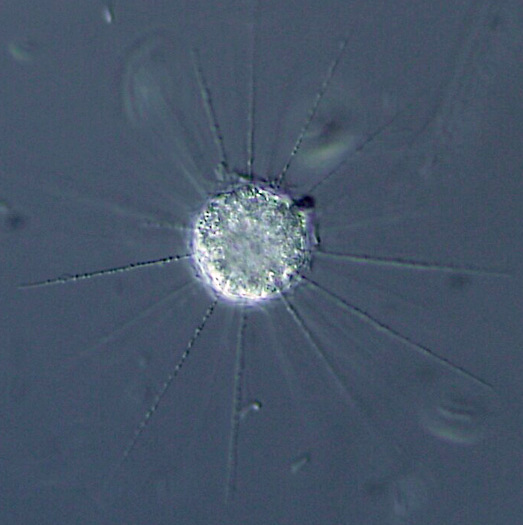
- Raphidiophrys contractilis

Scientific classification
- Domain: Eukaryota
- Supergroup: Haptista
- Class: Centroplasthelida; Febvre-Chevalier & Febvre 1984

Subgroups
- Pterocystida; Clypiferidae; Meringosphaera; Raphidophryidae; Pterista; Panacanthocystida; Chthonida; Acanthocystida; Incertae sedis: Spiculophryidae; Parasphaerastrum; Heteroraphidiophrys; Heterophrys; Choanocystis

Synonyms
- Centroheliozoa Cushman & Jarvis 1929 sensu Durrschmidt & Patterson 1987; Centrohelida Kühn 1926; Centrohelea Kühn 1926, emend. Cavalier-Smith 1993

= Centrohelid =

Centrohelids

Group of protists

The centrohelids or centroheliozoa are a group of heliozoan protists, single-celled eukaryotes with stiff radiating arms (known as axopodia) supported by microtubules and bearing extrusomes (known as kinetocysts). Their cells are spherical, ranging from 3 to 150 μm. Unlike other heliozoa, centrohelids lack flagella, have flat ribbon-shaped mitochondrial cristae, and arrange their microtubules in hexagons or triangles. Their microtubule-generating organelle, the centroplast, has a unique shape with a central trilamellar disc surrounded by two hemispherical caps. Some are naked or covered in a mucous coat, but most centrohelids produce cell coverings, namely organic spicules and siliceous scales of various species-specific shapes. Several species form colonies.

Centrohelids are passive predators with a cosmopolitan distribution. They feed on bacteria, other protists, and invertebrate larvae by phagocytosis; they can merge several cells around a larger prey to ingest it. Although they have been studied in aquatic (mostly freshwater) environments, they are more diverse in soil habitats. They include both free-floating and benthic forms, some of which attach to the substrate by a stalk.

Centrohelids are the closest relatives of the haptophyte algae, together forming the clade Haptista. Both groups have mineralized scales and at least one thin microtubule-based appendage. The common ancestor of centrohelids lost flagella and probably produced the two known types of cell coverings, organic spicules and complex siliceous scales. Some species can still produce both, while others secondarily lost or simplified them.

Centrohelids compose the class Centroplasthelida, in reference to their centroplast. Around 130 species have been described, but they only represent about 10% of the total estimated diversity, according to environmental DNA surveys. They are classified in 11 families grouped into two major clades, Pterocystida and Panacanthocystida.

== Characteristics ==
Centrohelids are heliozoans or "sun animalcules", a type of single-celled organisms that have axopodia, narrow stiff projections radiating from the cell and granting a sun ray appearance. These axopodia are internally supported by bundles of microtubules (axonemes) and bear visible extrusomes, organelles involved in the capture of prey, known as kinetocysts in centrohelids. Their cells are spherical, ranging in size from 3 μm (as in Choanocystis minima) to 150 μm (in Acanthocystis turfacea).

Centrohelid heliozoa are distinguished from other heliozoa by the absence of flagella and by several cellular features. One is their flat ('lamellate'), ribbon-shaped mitochondrial cristae. Another is a uniquely shaped microtubule-organizing center (MTOC), the organelle responsible for generating the axopodia. The MTOC of centrohelids, known as the centroplast, is located at the center of the cell and has a unique inner differentiation of a central trilamellar disc sandwiched between two dense hemispherical structures ('caps'), each around 0.1–1.5 μm in diameter. Centrohelids are also distinct in the arrangement of their axoneme-forming microtubules into hexagons and triangles.

Diagram of a centrohelid showing the different cellular compartments

A few centrohelids are naked (like Oxnerella) or with a mucous coat. The majority are able to produce two kinds of cell coverings: organic spicules and siliceous scales, which are generated in diverse shapes. The specific shape of the siliceous scales of many centrohelids helps identify the species. Some centrohelids bear both scales and spicules, either at the same time (as in Raphidiophrys heterophryoidea) or in separate stages of their life cycles (like Triangulopteris lacunata).

Some centrohelids have a mucous stalk to attach to the substrate (as in Raphidocystis arborescens). Some form colonies, with individual cells connected by cytoplasmic bridges, each cell with their own layer of spicules or scales. An exception is Yogsothoth: its colonies lack any bridges, and instead contain a roundish mass of densely packed cells surrounded by a thick outer layer of scales that differ from the inner plate scales covering each cell.

Although centrohelids have only one cell nucleus in normal conditions, multiple centrohelid cells have been observed fusing their cytoplasms to engulf a larger prey, resulting in a multinucleated cell.

== Nutrition ==
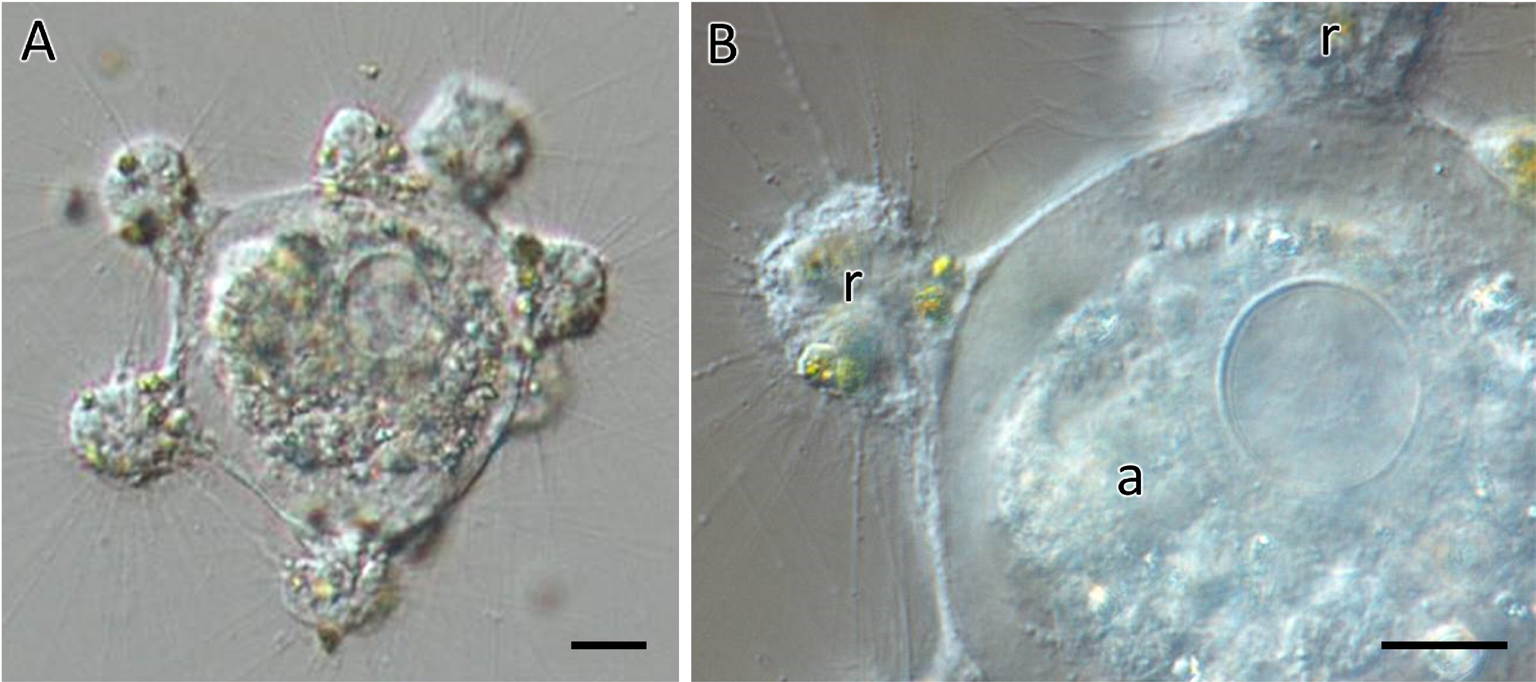
Various centrohelids (r) preying on an actinophryid (a) by extending their cytoplasms to form a common food vacuole around it. Scale bars: 10 μm.

Centrohelids feed on bacteria, other protists, and even larvae of invertebrates, through phagocytosis. They are considered passive feeders, capturing prey as they pass by. Experiments studying the feeding behavior of centrohelids are rare, but they have been observed consuming environmentally impactful strains of cyanobacteria, such as Microcystis aeruginosa and Aphanizomenon. This predation is interesting due to its potential to regulate harmful algal blooms caused by such cyanobacteria. In mixed cultures of centrohelids and actinophryids, another group of heliozoan passive feeders with the same ecological niche, the centrohelids outcompete actinophryids, causing a sharp decline in their population. Centrohelids can also fuse with more centrohelid cells to ingest actinophryid cells. Actinophryids actively avoid centrohelids, suggesting that they perceive centrohelids as threats.

One marine centrohelid genus, Meringosphaera, practices kleptoplastidy, i.e., temporarily seizes chloroplasts from its prey cells to use them for photosynthesis. In particular, it retains plastids from different green-colored algae of the class Dictyochophyceae. Despite the retainment being temporary, some of the genes associated with the retained plastids have been transferred to the centrohelid host's nucleus (endosymbiotic gene transfer); this feature is a major step in the transition towards acquiring permanent plastids.

== Ecology ==
Centrohelids are free-living predatory protists with a ubiquitous distribution. They are found abundantly in global freshwater environments, and also occur widely in marine and soil habitats, where they are comparatively understudied. Knowledge on their biogeography is scarce, even though they are ubiquitous. Most reports of centrohelids are done in temperate zones due to insufficient studies in tropical regions. Within temperate regions, the species diversity of freshwater centrohelids appears to be influenced by the type of body of water: highest diversity occurs in terrace forest lakes, while Sphagnum peat bogs have the lowest diversity. According to environmental DNA analyses, soil-dwelling centrohelids are twice as diverse as their freshwater counterparts, and ten times more than marine ones.

Like other heliozoans, most known species are found in aquatic benthic environments, where they prey on a variety of other microbes. Some float in the water column, while others attach to substrates by a stalk. Free-floating (planktonic) forms are well known, but the ecological niche of centrohelids is considered to be the benthos, inhabiting the superficial layer of detritus and interstitial spaces.

== Evolution ==
- - - Diaphoretickes
      - - - SAR
            - Stramenopiles
            - Alveolata
            - Rhizaria
          - ?
            Telonemia*
          - Haptista*
            - Haptophyta
            - Centroplasthelida
        - Disparia*
      - - Pancryptista*
        - Archaeplastida
          (plants sensu lato)
  - Other eukaryotes

Cladogram of eukaryotes focused on the position of centrohelids and related groups. The topology follows phylogenomic analyses published in the 2020s; telonemids may branch inside Haptista, or may be sister to SAR (as 'TSAR'). Groups included in the paraphyletic Hacrobia are marked *.

Before molecular phylogenetics, centrohelids were grouped with other axopodial protists in the polyphyletic taxon Heliozoa. Over the 1990s and 2000s decades, smaller heliozoan groups were removed from this artificial taxon and into their true evolutionary lineages, particularly Stramenopiles and Rhizaria. The centrohelids, the largest heliozoan group, remained difficult to resolve, and could not be placed within any other phyla.

With the first 18S rRNA gene sequences of centrohelids, weakly supported analyses indicated some affinities to bikonts (organisms ancestrally with two flagella), and they were suggested to have evolved from bikont flagellates such as ancyromonads. Based on further low-support 18S rRNA analyses and some cellular similarities, a relationship with haptophytes was later suggested, but phylogenetic trees were generally inconsistent. They also branched with telonemids and cryptomonads in a clade known as CCTH, later renamed Hacrobia.

In the 2010s, the monophyly of Haptista (centrohelids and haptophytes) was further confirmed with maximal support in larger-scale phylogenomic analyses, and Hacrobia was found to be paraphyletic. Haptista branches closer to the SAR supergroup (Stramenopiles, Alveolata, Rhizaria), while the clade containing cryptomonads and their relatives, Cryptista, is closer to plants. An elusive microheliozoan, Microheliella maris, previously suggested to be a possible centrohelid relative, branches next to Cryptista (forming Pancryptista) instead. All these groups belong to the large eukaryotic clade Diaphoretickes, from which all heliozoa are presumed to have evolved.

Traits present in haptophytes (specifically Prymnesiophyceae) are inferred as the ancestral state of centrohelids. Both have an outer coat of complex mineralized scales: calcareous in haptophytes, siliceous in centrohelids. Another common feature is the presence of a thin microtubule-based appendage used for feeding: the axopodia in centrohelids, and the haptonema in haptophytes. Centrohelids evolved from a common flagellate ancestor that secondarily lost its flagella, and was probably capable of producing both siliceous scales and organic spicules.

== Taxonomy ==
=== Nomenclature ===
The centrohelids compose the taxon Centroplasthelida, described by protistologists Colette Febvre-Chevalier and Jean Febvre in 1984, in reference to the centroplast that characterizes them among other heliozoa. A similar earlier name Centrohelida, established by Alfred Kühn in 1926, is not preferred because it includes both centrohelids and gymnosphaerids. A modified version of this name, Centrohelea, was used by some authors, especially Thomas Cavalier-Smith. The synonym Centroheliozoa was coined by Monika Dürrschmidt and David J. Patterson in 1987, and is used as an alternative common name for the group.

=== History ===
Traditionally, the classification and species identification of centrohelids has been based upon the morphology of their cell coverings (spicules and scales). According to the main cell covering types, three families were distinguished before molecular phylogenetics: "Heterophryidae", either naked or covered in organic spicules, proposed as the most primitive family; "Raphidiophryidae", interpreted as more derived, with tangential siliceous plate-scales; and "Acanthocystidae", interpreted as the most derived, with the most complex coverings, including a double layer of siliceous scales.

With the first molecular analyses using the 18S rRNA gene, and the first sequence of a naked centrohelid (Oxnerella), centrohelids were divided into two orders based on the presence of (at least seven) insertions in this gene: Acanthocystida (with insertions) and Pterocystida (without), both containing species with and without silica scales. The hypothesis for the ancestral centrohelid changed from a naked or spicule-bearing form to a form capable of producing complex coverings, secondarily lost or simplified. As such, "Acanthocystidae" represented the paraphyletic ancestral state, and "Heterophryidae" the polyphyletic derived state. Only Raphidiophryidae remained monophyletic, while the remaining centrohelids were grouped in new monophyletic families, including a modified Heterophryidae and Acanthocystidae.

- - Pterocystida
    - - - - - Pterocystidae*
            - Oxnerellidae
          - - Meringosphaera
            - Ozanamiidae
        - Spiculophryidae
      - Raphidiophryidae
    - Clypiferidae
  - Panacanthocystida
    - Chthonida
      Yogsothothidae
    - Acanthocystida
      - Ricksolina
        Ricksolidae*
      - Chalarothoracina
        - Acanthocystidae*
        - Raphidocystidae*

Cladogram of centrohelid families based on a 2023 phylogenetic analysis with the 18S rRNA gene. Environmental sequences are omitted. Dotted lines represent clades below 50% phylogenetic support. Families containing HLOs ("Heterophrys"-like organisms) are marked *.

The discovery and sequencing of new centrohelids led to updates in their higher classification. The circumscription of several families was modified to match molecular data. New relatives of Acanthocystida (such as Yogsothoth) were grouped in a larger clade Panacanthocystida. In the clade Pterocystida, families were briefly grouped into two orders: Raphidista, later abandoned due to the lack of phylogenetic support, and Pterista, still accepted. The two major clades, Pterocystida and Panacanthocystida, are often considered superorders.

=== Described taxa ===
New species of centrohelids are continuously described in new environments, and the total number of described species has increased from around 85 species in 1999 to about 130 in 2021. Environmental DNA sampling suggests that over 90% of species remain undescribed. Listed below are the accepted centrohelid genera, grouped into 11 families:

- Superorder Pterocystida Cavalier-Smith in Yabuki et al. 2012
  - Family Clypiferidae Shɨshkin in Shɨshkin et al. 2021 — Clypifer.
  - Meringosphaera Lohmann 1902 (no family formally described).
  - Family Ozanamiidae Shɨshkin-Skarð 2023 — Ozanamia.
  - Family Raphidiophryidae Febvre-Chevalier & Febvre 1984 emend. Shɨshkin & Zlatogursky 2018 — Raphidiophrys.
  - Order Pterista Shɨshkin & Zlatogursky 2018
    - Family Oxnerellidae Cavalier-Smith & Chao 2012 — Oxnerella.
    - Family Pterocystidae Cavalier-Smith & von der Heyden 2007 — Chlamydaster, Pseudoraphidocystis, Pseudoraphidiophrys, Pterocystis, Raineriophrys (=Raineria, Echinocystis), Triangulopteris, Sphaerastrum.
- Superorder Panacanthocystida Shɨshkin & Zlatogursky 2018
  - Order Chthonida Shɨshkin & Zlatogursky 2018, suborder Yogsothothina Shɨshkin & Zlatogursky 2018, family Yogsothothidae Shɨshkin & Zlatogursky 2018 — Yogsothoth.
  - Order Acanthocystida Cavalier-Smith 2011
    - Suborder Ricksolina Shɨshkin-Skarð 2023, family Ricksolidae Shɨshkin-Skarð 2023 — Ricksol.
    - Suborder Chalarothoracina Hertwig & Lesser 1874 emend. Cavalier-Smith in Yabuki et al. 2012
      - Family Raphidocystidae Zlatogursky in Zlatogursky et al. 2018 — Raphidocystis.
      - Family Acanthocystidae Claus 1874 emend. Cavalier-Smith & von der Heyden 2007 — Acanthocystis.

The following taxa have an uncertain status among centrohelids:

- Heterophrys and other spicule-bearing genera — The genus Heterophrys was established to group species covered in needle-like spicules. Spicule-bearing forms are scattered across the centrohelid tree, and some have been described within the life cycle of scale-bearing species. Therefore, potentially all centrohelids have "Heterophrys"-like stages. Because of this, genera that have been typified on "Heterophrys"-like organisms (HLOs) are now considered nomina dubia: Heterophrys Archer 1869, Sphaerastrum Greef 1873, and Marophrys Cavalier-Smith & von der Heyden 2007.
- Parasphaerastrum Mikrjukov 1996 — This genus has not been sequenced and is considered incertae sedis among centrohelids.
- Heteroraphidiophrys Mikrjukov & Patterson 2000 — This genus was first mentioned by Mikrjukov in 2002, but was never formally described. The organism needs to be re-isolated, carefully studied and provided with a formal taxonomic description.
- Spiculophryidae Shɨshkin & Zlatogursky 2018 — The phylogenetic position of this family, containing only the genus Spiculophrys Zlatogursky 2015, is not yet firmly resolved. Depending on the parameters of phylogenetic analysis, it branched either as sister to all other centrohelids or as sister to one of the two superorders. It is considered incertae sedis among centrohelids.
- Choanocystis Penard 1904 — The initial description of this genus did not report any feature indicative of centrohelids, except possibly external spine scales and internal plate scales (reported as "sticks and scales"), which he mentioned without specifying their precise shape. These were already the diagnostic features of Acanthocystis, a genus described earlier, and he did not provide a comparison of both. In 1988, an organism was identified as "Choanocystis lepidula" with no explanation for its identity, and its diagnostic feature (a cardioid-shaped basal plate of spine scales) also leaves its affinity uncertain, as it appears in several centrohelid clades. The organism known as "C. lepidula" is similar to a sequenced strain belonging to Panacanthocystida, but cannot be traced to the "Choanocystis" genus. Two additional species with cardioid-shaped basal plates, initially placed under "Choanocystis" and branching in Pterocystida, were eventually transferred to a newer genus Ozanamia in 2023.
