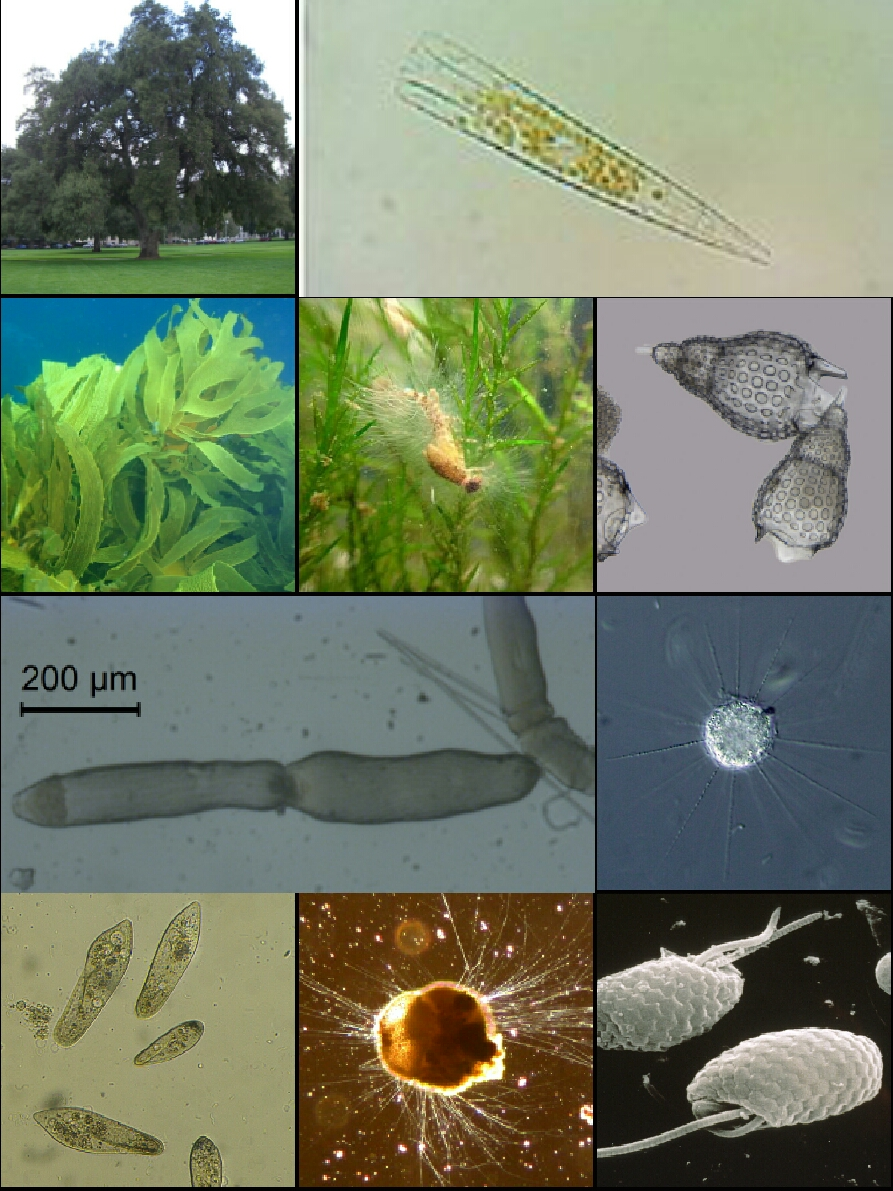

Scientific classification
- Domain: Eukaryota
- Superkingdom: Corticata; Lankester 1878, emend. Cavalier-Smith 2002

Kingdoms
- Plantae; Chromista

= Corticata =

Proposed superkingdom

Corticata ("one with a cortex"), in the classification of eukaryotes (living organisms with a cell nucleus), is a superkingdom suggested by Thomas Cavalier-Smith to encompass the following two eukaryote supergroups:

- Plantae, or Archaeplastida (land plants, red algae, green algae, and glaucophytes)
- Chromalveolata (a polyphyletic group including kelp, water moulds, ciliates, dinoflagellates, and other organisms)

Cavalier-Smith later included Rhizaria as well, resulting in a close similarity to Diaphoretickes — not identical as Diaphoretickes does not contain polyphyletic taxa.

== See also ==
- Bikont
- Cabozoa
