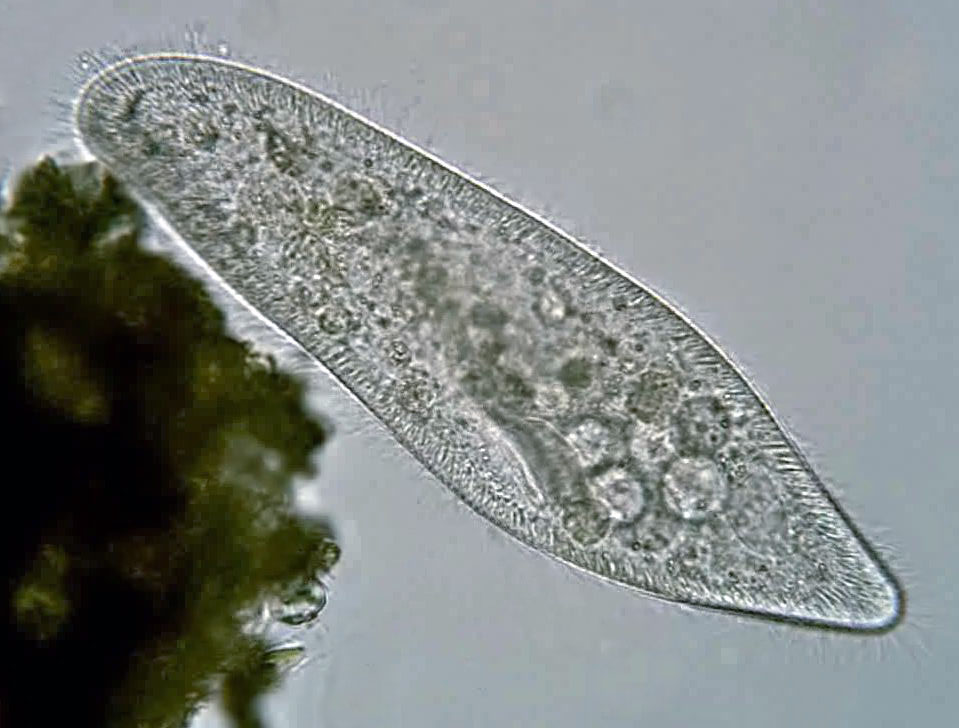
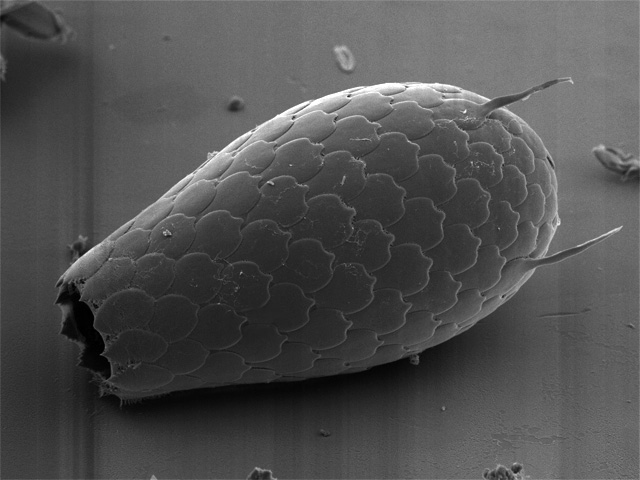
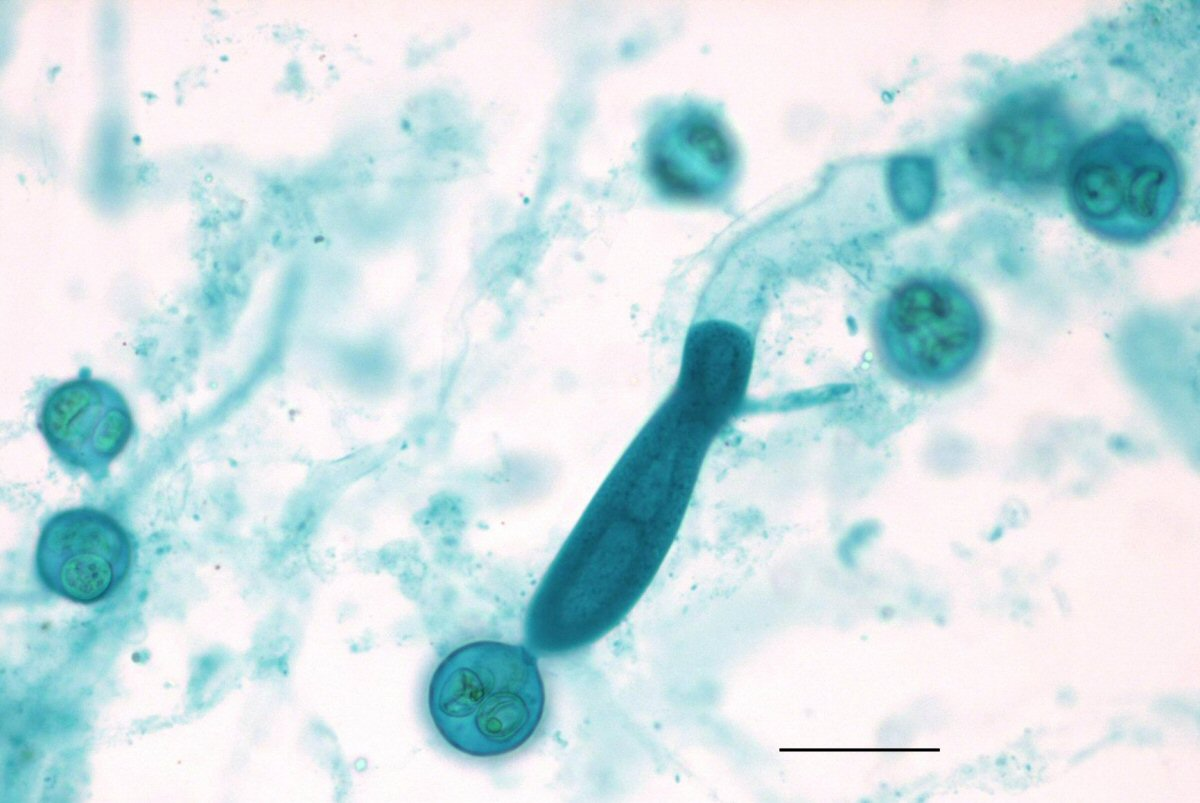
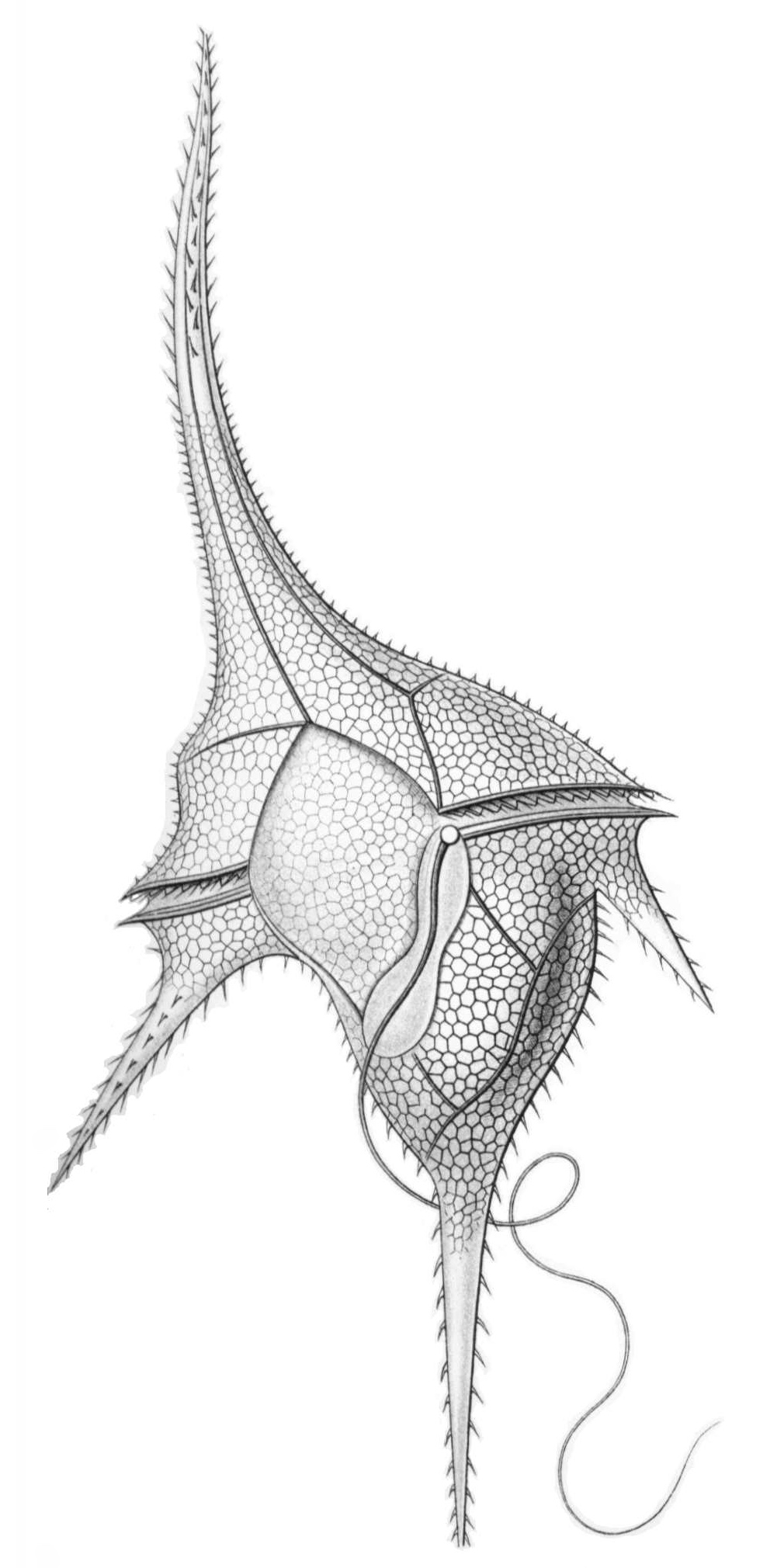
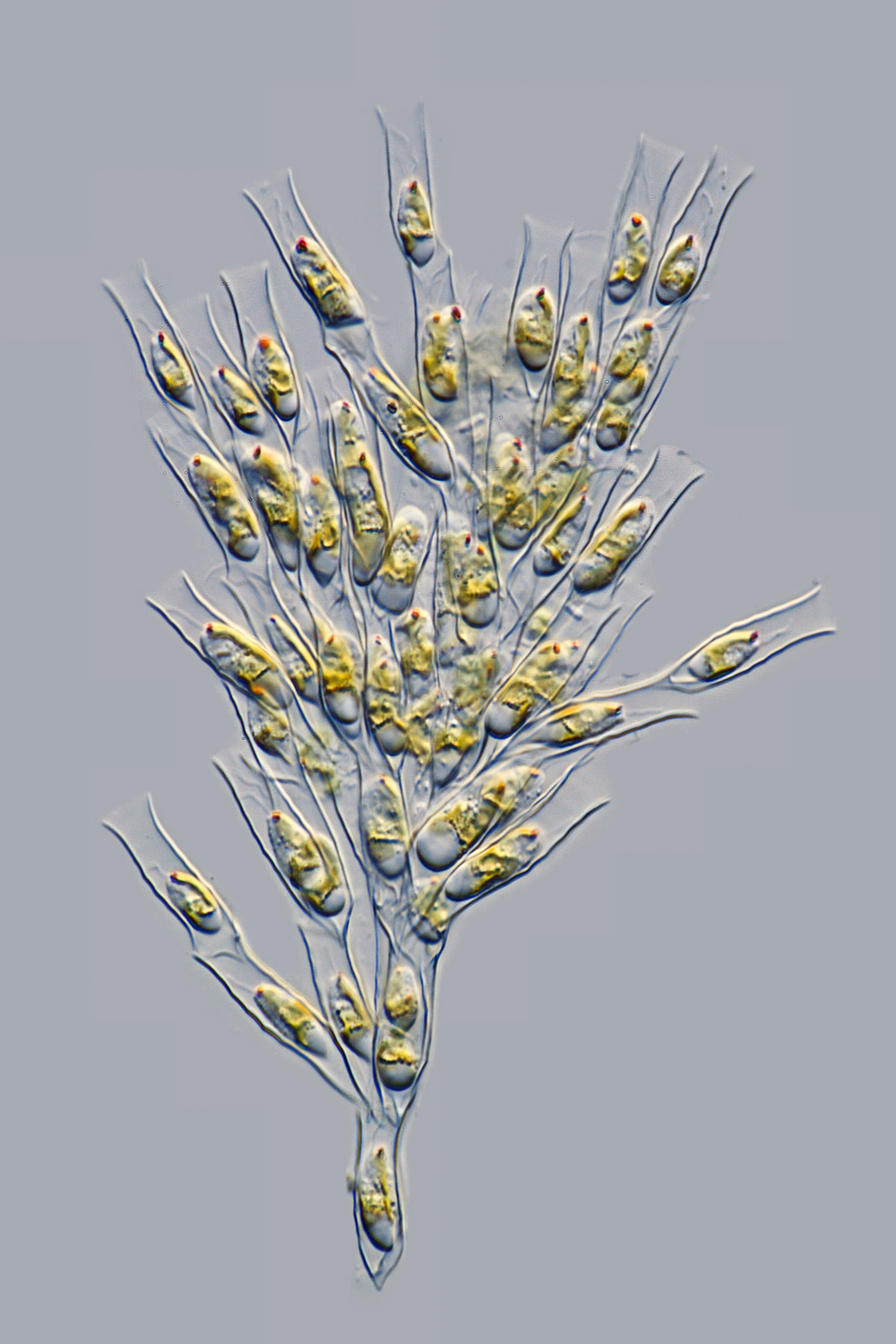
- From left to right in each row, top to bottom: Paramecium caudatum (Ciliophora), Didymocrytus tetrathalamus (Radiolaria), Euglypha (Cercozoa), Saprolegnia (Oomycota), Ceratium hirundinella (Dinoflagellata), Dinobryon divergens (Ochrophyta), Leucocytozoon danilewskyi (Apicomplexa)

Scientific classification
- Domain: Eukaryota
- Clade: Diaphoretickes
- Clade: Sar; Burki et al. 2008, emend. Adl et al. 2012

Subgroups
- Halvaria; Stramenopiles (heterokonts); Alveolata; Rhizaria; Incertae sedis; Labyrinthomyxa

Synonyms
- Harosa Cavalier-Smith 2010; SAR Burki et al. 2008; RAS Baldauf 2008

= SAR (clade) =

Sar Temporal range: 736–0 Ma

Eukaryotic supergroup that comprises stramenopiles, alveolates and rhizarians

SAR (Note: As a formal taxon, Sar has only its first letter capitalized, while the earlier abbreviation, SAR, retains all uppercase letters. Both names denote the same group of organisms.) is a highly diverse clade of eukaryotes, often considered a supergroup, that includes stramenopiles (heterokonts), alveolates, and rhizarians. It is a node-based taxon (under the Sar name), including all descendants of the three groups' last common ancestor, and comprises most of the now-rejected Chromalveolata. Their sister group might be telonemids, with which they would make up the TSAR clade, but this grouping has been challenged.

== Etymology ==
The name SAR is an acronym derived from the first letters of its three constituent clades (Stramenophiles, Alveolata, Rhizaria); it has been alternatively spelled RAS. The term Harosa (at the subkingdom level) has also been used, with Stramenopiles replaced by its synonym Heterokonta in this variant of the acronym.

== History of discovery ==
Before the discovery of the SAR supergroup, stramenopiles and alveolates were classified in the supergroup Chromalveolata alongside haptophytes and cryptomonads, being believed to have acquired plastids through secondary endosymbiosis of red algae through a common ancestor. Meanwhile, Rhizaria was traditionally considered to be a separate supergroup. More recent phylogenetic studies confirmed that stramenopiles and alveolates diverged with rhizarians as part of the SAR lineage. This clade has been found by later phylogenomic studies to be robustly characterized compared to other supergroups.

This group excludes haptophytes and cryptomonads, hypothesized to have acquired plastids in separate endosymbiosis events, leading Okamoto et al. (2009) to propose the clade Hacrobia to accommodate them.

== Diversity ==
The SAR supergroup encompasses a variety of morphologies and ecological niches, from microscopic zoo- and phytoplankton to massive kelp forests. The group includes both photosynthetic and non-photosynthetic forms. Photosynthesis arose independently across various stramenopile and alveolate lineages through secondary or higher-order endosymbiosis events, acquiring plastids of red algal origin, while chlorarachniophyte rhizarians captured plastids from green algae, retaining vestigial nucleomorphs.

It has been estimated that SAR encompasses up to half of all eukaryotic diversity.

Owing to the clade's discovery through phylogenomics, there are no known synapomorphies uniting its various members. This was already the case for its subclade Rhizaria, established earlier through similar means. On the other hand, Stramenopiles is well-defined morphologically, characterized by an anterior flagellum with tripartite bristles (mastigonemes), while Alveolata is united by the presence of cortical alveoli.

Nonetheless, studies of telonemids have revealed characteristics such as tripartite hair and peripheral vacuoles, potentially homologous to similar structures in stramenopiles and alveolates. This brings into light the possibility of these structures being ancestrally shared by the clade, with cortical alveoli originating from peripheral vacuoles under this hypothesis.

=== Internal phylogeny ===
A 2021 analysis places Alveolata and Stramenopiles in Halvaria, as sister to Rhizaria.

- - SAR / Harosa
    - Rhizaria
    - Halvaria
      - Alveolata
      - Stramenopiles

== See also ==
- Amoebozoa
- Archaeplastida
- Excavata
- Opisthokonta
