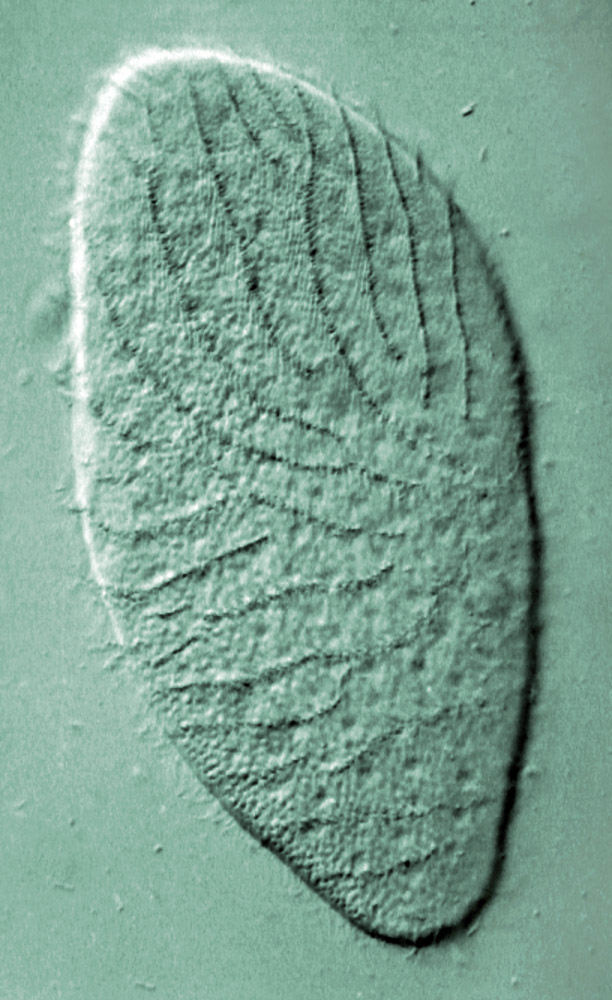
- Opalina ranarum, an opalozoan

Scientific classification
- Domain: Eukaryota
- Clade: Sar
- Clade: Stramenopiles
- Phylum: Bigyra
- Subphylum: Opalozoa; Cavalier-Smith, 1991 stat. nov. 2006

Classes and possible taxa
- Placidozoa; "Wobblata"; Placididea; Nanomonadea; Opalomonadea; Opalinata; Opalinea; Blastocystea; Bikosia; Bikosea; Pendulomonas; Bordnamonadidae

= Opalozoa =

Subphylum of protists

Opalozoa is a subphylum of heterotrophic protists of the phylum Bigyra, and is the sister group to Sagenista. Opalozoans are non-photosynthetic heterokonts that are ancestrally phagotrophic but many times have evolved to be osmotrophic saprotrophs in the gut of vertebrate animals.

== Taxonomy ==
=== History: phylum Opalozoa ===
In 1993 the name “Opalozoa” referred to a group of protists that was very different from what it is now. It was a phylum composed of many unrelated zooflagellates, grouped together because of the common presence of tubular mitochondrial cristae and the lack of cortical alveoli or rigid tubular ciliary hairs (retronemes). It also included the opalinids, proteomyxids and plasmodiophorids.

Cavalier-Smith's defunct phylum Opalozoa (1993)
Subphylum Proterozoa; Class Heteromitea; Subclass Sarcomonadia; Superorder Jakobidea; Order Jakobida; Order Cercomonadida; Superorder Thaumatomonadidea; Order Thaumatomonadida; Superorder Proteomyxidea; Order Pseudosporida; Order Leucodictyida; Subclass Thecomonadia; Order Apusomonadida; Order Cryomonadida; Subclass Anisomonadia; Order Diphylleida; Order Proteromonadida; Class Phytomyxea; Order Phagomyxida; Order Plasmodiophorida; Class Telonemea; Order Telonemida; Order Nephromycida; Class Cyathobodonea; Order Pseudodendromonadida; Order Spongomonadida; Order Kathablepharida; Class Ebridea; Order Ebriida	Subphylum Opalinata; Class Opalinea; Order Karotomorphida; Order Opalinida	Subphylum Kinetomonada; Class Kinetomonadea; Order Histionida; Order Heliomonadida	Subphylum Hemimastigophora; Class Hemimastigea; Order Hemimastigida

=== Modern classification ===
The modern taxonomy of Opalozoa, down to order level, is as follows:

- Subphylum Opalozoa Cavalier-Smith, 1991 stat. nov. 2006 emend. 2018
  - Infraphylum Bikosia Cavalier-Smith, 2013
    - Class Bikosea Cavalier-Smith nom. n. pro Bicosoecea Cavalier-Smith, 1986
      - Subclass Bicosidia Cavalier-Smith, 2006 orth. emend.
        - Superorder Cyathobodoniae Cavalier-Smith, 1993 emend. stat. nov. 2006
          - Order Bicoecida Grassé, 1926
          - Order Anoecida Cavalier-Smith, 1997 emend. 2006
          - Order Pseudodendromonadida Hibberd, 1985 emend. Cavalier-Smith, 2006
        - Superorder Borokiae Cavalier-Smith, 2006
          - Order Borokida Cavalier-Smith, 2006
      - Subclass Rictidia Cavalier-Smith, 2013
        - Order Rictida Cavalier-Smith, 2013
  - Infraphylum Placidozoa Cavalier-Smith, 2013
    - Superclass Wobblata Cavalier-Smith, 2006 stat. nov. 2013 [paraphyletic]
      - Class Placididea Moriya, Nakayama & Inouye, 2002
        - Order Placidida Moriya, Nakayama & Inouye, 2002 [=Placidae Cavalier-Smith, 2006]
      - Class Nanomonadea Cavalier-Smith, 2013
        - Order Uniciliatida Cavalier-Smith, 2013
      - Class Opalomonadea Cavalier-Smith, 2013
    - Superclass Opalinata Wenyon, 1926 emend. Cavalier-Smith, 1996 stat. nov. 2006
      - Class Opalinea Wenyon, 1926 stat. nov. Cavalier-Smith, 1993 emend. 2013
        - Order Proteromonadida Grassé, 1952 emend. Cavalier-Smith, 1993
        - Order Opalinida Poche, 1913 stat. nov. Hall, 1953 emend. Cavalier-Smith
      - Class Blastocystea Zierdt et al., 1967
        - Order Blastocystida Zierdt, 1978
- Opalozoa incertae sedis:
  - Pendulomonas Tong, 1977
  - Bordnamonadidae Cavalier-Smith, 2013

== Phylogeny ==
The cladogram below shows the internal relationships of Opalozoa.

- Opalozoa
  - Placidozoa
    - - - Opalinata
          - Opalinea
          - Blastocystea
        - Opalomonadea
      - Nanomonadea
    - Placididea
  - Bikosea
    - - - Pseudodendromonadida
        - - Bicoecida
          - Anoecida
      - Borokida
    - Rictida
