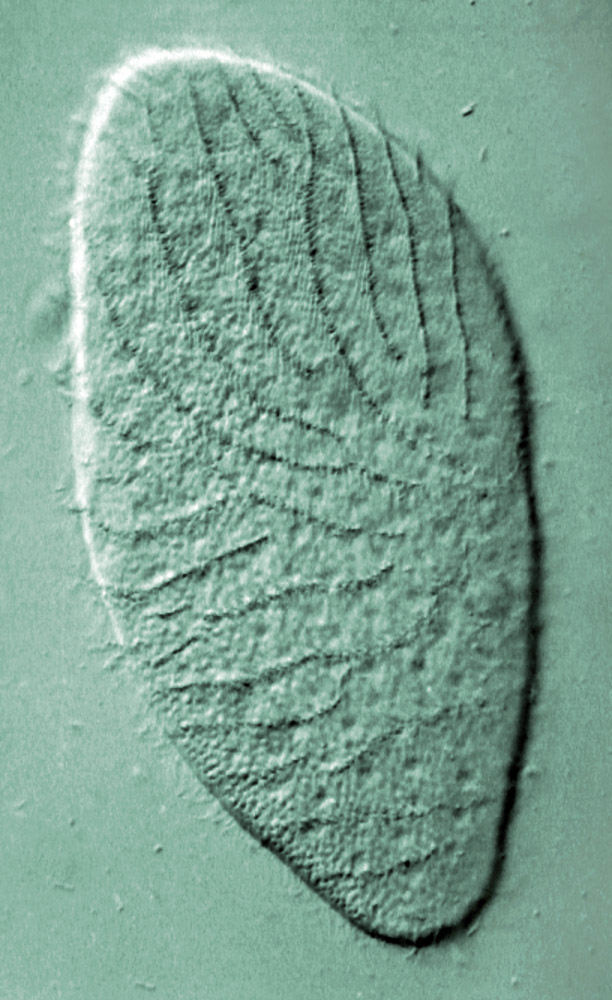
- Opalina ranarum, a species of placidozoan

Scientific classification
- Domain: Eukaryota
- Clade: Sar
- Clade: Stramenopiles
- Phylum: Bigyra
- Subphylum: Opalozoa
- Infraphylum: Placidozoa; Cavalier-Smith 2013

Classes
- "Wobblata"; Placididea; Nanomonadea; Opalomonadea; Opalinata; Opalinea; Blastocystea

= Placidozoa =

Group of non-photosynthetic organisms

Placidozoa is a recently defined non-photosynthetic lineage of Stramenopiles.

== Phylogeny ==
In 2016, Philippe Silar presented the following phylogeny for the Placidozoa:

- Placidozoa
  - Placididea
  - - Nanomonadea
    - - Opalomonadea
      - Opalinata
        - Blastocystea
        - Opalinea

== Taxonomy ==
Infraphylum Placidozoa Cavalier-Smith 2013

- Superclass Wobblata Cavalier-Smith 2006 stat. n. 2013 (paraphyletic)
  - Class Placididea Moriya, Nakayama & Inouye 2002
    - Order Placidida Moriya, Nakayama & Inouye 2002 [Placidae Cavalier-Smith 2006]
      - Family Placidiaceae Moriya, Nakayama & Inouye 2002
        - Genus Pendulomonas Tong 1997
        - Genus Placidia Moriya, Nakayama & Inouye 2002
        - Genus Wobblia Moriya, Nakayama & Inouye 2000
        - Genus Allegra Rybarski et al. 2015
  - Class Nanomonadea Cavalier-Smith 2013
    - Order Uniciliatida Cavalier-Smith 2013
      - Family Solenicolidae Cavalier- Smith 2013
        - Genus Solenicola Pavillard 1916
      - Family Incisomonadidae Cavalier-Smith & Scoble 2013
        - Genus Incisomonas Scoble & Cavalier-Smith 2013
  - Class Opalomonadea Cavalier-Smith 2013
- Superclass Opalinata Wenyon 1926 emend. Cavalier-Smith 1996 stat. n. 2006
  - Class Blastocystea Zierdt et al. 1967 [Blastocysta Zierdt 1978; Blastocystina Zierdt 1978]
    - Order Blastocystida Zierdt 1978
      - Family Blastocystidae Jiang & He 1988 non Jaekel 1918
        - Genus Blastocystis Alexeev 1911 non Jaekel 1918
  - Class Opalinea Wenyon 1926 stat. n. Cavalier-Smith 1993 emend. Cavalier-Smith 2013
    - Order Proteromonadida Grassé 1952 emend. Cavalier-Smith 1993 [Proteromonadea Caval.-Sm. 1997]
      - Family Proteromonadidae Grassé 1952
        - Genus Proteromonas Kunstler 1883 [Prowazekella Alexeieff 1912]
    - Order Opalinida Poche 1913 stat. n. Hall 1953 emend. Cavalier-Smith
      - Family Karotomorphidae Travis 1934 [Karotomorphida Cavalier-Smith 1993]
        - Genus Karotomorpha Travis 1934 [Tetramastix Alexeieff 1916 non Zacharias 1898]
      - Family Opalinidae Claus 1874
        - Genus Bezzenbergia Earl 1973
        - Genus Hegneriella Earl 1971
        - Genus Cepedea Metcalf 1920
        - Genus Opalina Purkinje & Valentin 1835
        - Genus Protozelleriella Delvinquier, Markus & Passmore 1991
        - Genus Zelleriella Metcalf 1920
        - Genus Protoopalina Metcalf 1918
