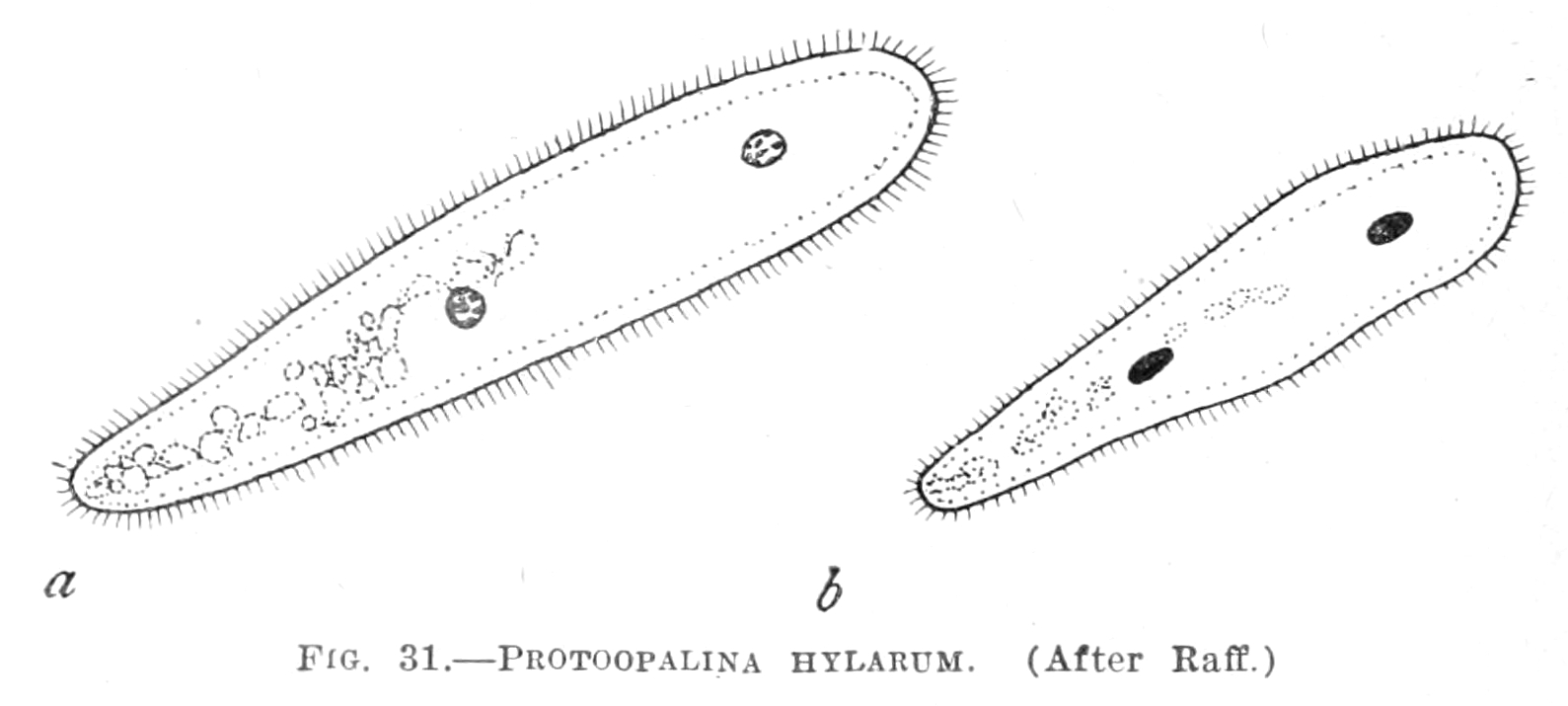
- artist: Maynard M. Metcalf (1923), after Janet W. Raff (1911)

Scientific classification
- Domain: Eukaryota
- Clade: Sar
- Clade: Stramenopiles
- Phylum: Bigyra
- Subphylum: Opalozoa
- Infraphylum: Placidozoa
- Superclass: Opalinata
- Class: Opalinea
- Order: Opalinida
- Family: Opalinidae
- Genus: Protoopalina
- Species: P. hylarum

Binomial name
- Protoopalina hylarum (Raff, 1911)

= Protoopalina hylarum =

Species of single-celled organism

Protoopalina hylarum is a species of protozoa in the Opalinidae family, and an amphibian parasite. It was first described in 1911 by Janet W. Raff as Opalina hylarum.

== Hosts ==
This parasite has been found in the green and golden bell frog Litoria aurea, but has also been reported in the Cane toad (Rhinella marina).
