= Uniciliatida =

Scientific classification
- Domain: Eukaryota
- Clade: Sar
- Clade: Stramenopiles
- Phylum: Bigyra
- Infraphylum: Placidozoa
- Class: Nanomonadea; Cavalier-Smith (2013)
- Order: Uniciliatida; Cavalier-Smith (2013)

Families
- Solenicolidae; Incisomonadidae

Order of protists

Nanomonadea is a class of biciliate phagotrophic, non-photosynthetic free-living opalozoans, containing the sole order Uniciliatida. This monophyletic group previously known as clade MAST-3 is characterized by a single hairless posterior cilium and absence of an anterior cilium.

== Phylogeny ==
The cladogram below shows the relationships between Nanomonadea and the rest of opalozoans.

- Opalozoa
  - Placidozoa
    - - - Opalinata
          - Opalinea
          - Blastocystea
        - Opalomonadea
      - Nanomonadea
    - Placididea
  - Bikosea
    - - - Pseudodendromonadida
        - - Bicoecida
          - Anoecida
      - Borokida
    - Rictida

== Taxonomy ==
The taxonomy of Nanomonadea is as follows:

- Subphylum Opalozoa Cavalier-Smith 1999 stat. nov. 2006
  - Infraphylum Placidozoa Cavalier-Smith 2013
    - Superclass Wobblata Cavalier-Smith 2006 supercl. nov. 2013 (paraphyletic)
      - Class Nanomonadea Cavalier-Smith 2013
        - Order Uniciliatida Cavalier-Smith 2013
          - Family Solenicolidae Cavalier-Smith 2013 – Solenicola
          - Family Incisomonadidae Cavalier-Smith 2013 – Incisomonas
