= Symbiomonas =

Scientific classification
- Domain: Eukaryota
- Clade: Sar
- Clade: Stramenopiles
- Phylum: Bigyra
- Order: Bicosoecida
- Clade: Anoecida
- Family: Symbiomonadaceae
- Genus: Symbiomonas; Guillou & Chrétiennot-Dinet, 1999
- Species: S. scintillans

Binomial name
- Symbiomonas scintillans Guillou & Chrétiennot-Dinet, 1999

Genus of marine protists

Symbiomonas is a genus of eukaryotic organism notable for its unique morphology and genomic characteristics and viral associations. Symbiomonas scintillans is the only species in this genus. Initially discovered by Guillou et al. in 1999 from samples of low nutrient water in the Pacific Ocean and Mediterranean Sea, intracellular structures that resembled bacteria led to speculation that it was an endosymbiont. This heavily influenced the genus' classification and understanding, early in its discovery. Limited research on this genus allowed this information to remain uncontested for years until comprehensive genomic analysis by Cho et al. in 2024. They found no genomic evidence for endosymbiotic bacteria but rather the presence of giant viruses. Symbiomonas exhibit distinct morphological traits that allow it to live in oligotrophic marine environments where the availability of nutrients is severely limited. As some of the smallest free-living heterotrophic eukaryotes, it relies on the efficiency of their flagellar propulsion locomotion to move through the water column and capture bacterial prey. Unlike many other protists that have a protective casing structure like a lorica or shell, Symbiomonas is a naked flagellate. Along with morphological traits, these features categorize Symbiomonas as closely related to other bicosoecid heterotrophs.

== Etymology ==
The etymology of the genus name of Symbiomonas stems from the fact that they were believed to have contained endosymbiotic bacteria. The first researchers to discover Symbiomonas were Laure Guillou and Marie-Joesephe Chrétiennot-Dinet who found Symbiomonas in 1999 in an oligotrophic environment near the Pacific and Mediterranean Sea. Their study laid the foundational understanding of this organism, initially suggesting that an endosymbiotic bacteria resided within it. The publishing of Cho et al.'s detailed genomic analysis of Symbiomonas in 2024 was an extremely important study to develop our understanding on this genus. Cho et al. found no trace of bacterial DNA. Instead, they found genomic evidence for giant viruses that are closely related to prasinovirus lineages.

== Description ==
=== Morphology ===
Symbiomonas has a spherical or slightly ovoid shape approximately 1.1-1.5 μm wide and 1.2-1.5 μm long. This puts Symbiomonas among some of the smallest known free-living eukaryotic cells. Symbiomonas are naked flagellates, meaning that they lack a lorica.

Symbiomonas have a singular anteriorly positioned flagellum for locomotion. This motion is enhanced by tripartite mastigonemes characteristic of Stramenopiles on the flagellum. These mastigonemes allow Symbiomonas to swim straight quickly, or with a distinctive flickering motion.

The nucleus is located central with the Golgi apparatus nearby. Symbiomonas also have two mitochondria with tubular cristae that are symmetrically located close to the flagellar basal body. Symbiomonas possess a root system with an R3 root that extends dorsally, and a R1 root that extends ventrally. These roots contain microtubules that provide cellular stability during locomotion by anchoring the flagellum.

=== Genetics ===
Genetic analysis of Symbiomonas place them in the bicosoecid group within the lineage of heterotrophic stramenopiles. This makes Symbiomonas very closely related to Cafeteria roenbergensis and Bicosoeca maris.

Symbiomonas harbor giant viruses that are related to prasinoviruses which are known to infect green algae such as Ostreococcus lucimarinus, Bathycoccus prasinos, and Micromonas pusilla. By using Bathycoccus prasinos as a reference, Cho et al. were able to assemble a nearly complete draft viral genome of 190 kbp which contained hallmark prasinovirus genes.

=== Habitat and ecology ===
The habitat of Symbiomonas is oligotrophic marine environments in the Pacific Ocean and Mediterranean Sea. It is hypothesized that their adaptation for these low nutrient conditions come from their mitochondria with tubular cristae. Symbiomonas habitats have been found to be in areas with high populations of picophytoplankton, specifically the cyanobacteria Prochlorococcus and Synechococcus. It was initially hypothesized that these were the main food sources for Symbiomonas, but studies indicated that they did not significantly graze on these cyanobacteria populations. However, bacteria has been found in Symbiomonas food vacuoles, suggesting they do graze on other heterotrophic bacteria, thus having a role in microbial food webs, and contributing to the regulation of microbial populations and nutrient cycling.

== Practical importance ==
Feeding on bacteria and picoplankton makes them a big component that helps regulate microbial populations and nutrient cycling in oligotrophic environments. The presence of giant viruses within Symbiomonas opens possible research into virus-host interactions in marine environments.
