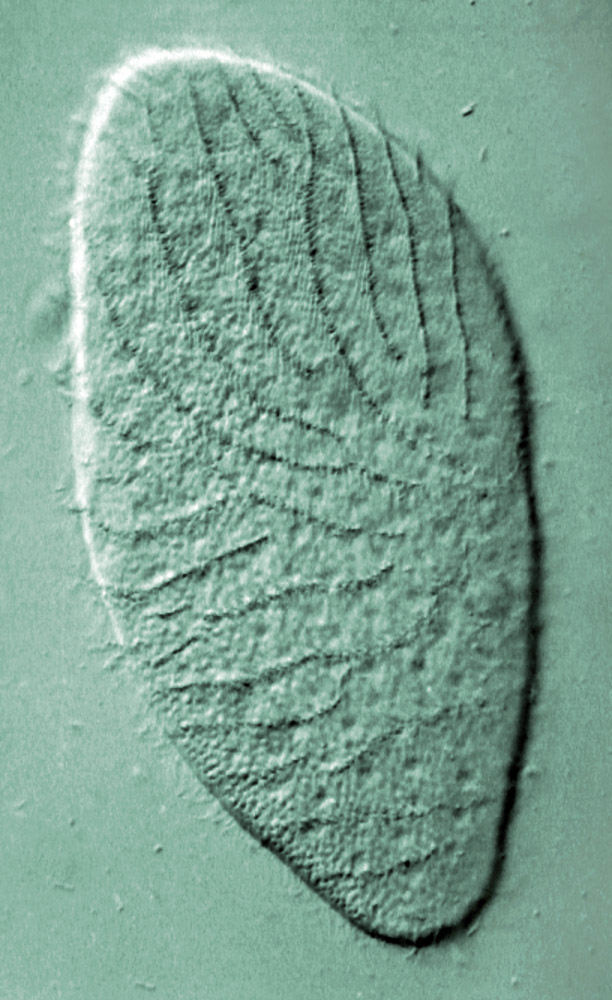
- Opalina ranarum, a species of Opalinea

Scientific classification
- Domain: Eukaryota
- Clade: Sar
- Clade: Stramenopiles
- Phylum: Bigyra
- Infraphylum: Placidozoa
- Superclass: Opalinata; Wenyon, 1926 em. Cavalier-Smith, 1996 stat. n. 2006

Classes
- Opalinea; Blastocystea

Synonyms
- Slopalinida Patterson, 1985

= Opalinata =

Superclass of stramenopiles

Opalinata is a superclass of non-phagotrophic heterokonts that unites the classes Opalinea and Blastocystea, and is the sister group to Opalomonadea.

== Description ==
When Opalinata was first erected as a taxon in 1926, it was placed as the sole class in the group "Protociliata" and considered as primitive ciliates due to the fact that they move thanks to their numerous cilia and that they both present two nuclei. They were distinguished because they perform syngamy by the complete fusion of uninucleated gametes, while the rest of the ciliates, forming "Euciliata" (Ciliata + Suctoria), perform syngamy through their micronuclei alone while their macronuclei dissolve.

The taxon Opalinata was revised in 1996 by Cavalier-Smith and placed in Opalozoa, and is now defined by the following synapomorphies: gut parasitism and the loss of peroxisomes and phagocytosis.

== Phylogeny ==
The cladogram below shows the relationships between Opalinata and the rest of Opalozoa.

- Opalozoa
  - Placidozoa
    - - - Opalinata
          - Opalinea
          - Blastocystea
        - Opalomonadea
      - Nanomonadea
    - Placididea
  - Bikosea

== Classification ==
The modern taxonomy of Opalinata is as follows:

- Phylum Bigyra
  - Subphylum Opalozoa Cavalier-Smith, 1991 stat. n. 2006 em.
    - Infraphylum Placidozoa Cavalier-Smith 2013
      - Superclass Opalinata Wenyon, 1926 em. Cavalier-Smith, 1996 stat. n. 2006
        - Class Opalinea Wenyon, 1926 stat. n. Cavalier-Smith, 1993 em. 2013
          - Order Proteromonadida Grassé, 1952 em. Cavalier-Smith, 1993
            - Family Proteromonadidae Grassé, 1952 (Proteromonas)
          - Order Opalinida Poche, 1913 stat. n. Hall, 1953 em. Cavalier-Smith
            - Family Karotomorphidae Travis, 1934 (Karotomorpha)
            - Family Opalinidae Claus, 1874 (e.g. Cepedea, Protoopalina, Opalina)
        - Class Blastocystea Zierdt et al., 1967
          - Order Blastocystida Zierdt, 1978
            - Family Blastocystidae Jiang and He, 1988 (type genus Blastocystis Aléxéieff, 1911)
