= Platysulcus =

Scientific classification
- Domain: Eukaryota
- Clade: Sar
- Clade: Stramenopiles
- Clade: incertae sedis
- Class: Platysulcea; Cavalier-Smith 2018
- Order: Platysulcida; Cavalier-Smith 2018
- Family: Platysulcidae; Shiratori, Nkayama & Ishida 2015
- Genus: Platysulcus; Shiratori, Nakayama & Ishida 2015
- Species: P. tardus

Binomial name
- Platysulcus tardus Shiratori, Nkayama & Ishida 2015

Genus of single-celled organisms

Platysulcus tardus (from Latin platy 'wide' and sulcus 'furrow') is a eukaryotic microorganism discovered in 2015 to be the earliest diverging lineage of the stramenopile phylogenetic tree. It is the only member of the family Platysulcidae, order Platysulcida and class Platysulcea.

== Morphology ==
Platysulcus is a gliding biflagellate, with a short anterior flagellum, a long posterior flagellum, and a flagellar apparatus typical of stramenopiles. It has tubular mastigonemes on the anterior flagellum. It contains mitochondria with tubular cristae. The basal body and the transitional region of the flagella lack ring-shaped or helical structures. The two flagellar roots consist of 11 microtubules forming an "L"-shape.

Its cells are oval or ovoid in shape, around 5.62 μm in length and 3.76 μm in width. The anterior flagellum is around 9 μm in length, and the posterior measures around 17 μm. They contain extrusomes and a large, flat vesicle surrounding the cytoplasm where the nucleus, mitochondria, and microbodies are found.

== Ecology ==
Platysulcus was isolated from sedimented detritus on seaweed collected near Ngeruktabel Island, Palau. It is a free-living phagotrophic protist, bacterivorous and marine.

== Phylogeny and taxonomy ==
=== Phylogeny ===
Phylogenetic analyses recover Platysulcea as the earliest diverging lineage of Stramenopiles, sister to a clade containing Bigyra and Gyrista.

- Stramenopiles
  - - Gyrista
      - Ochrophyta
      - - Pseudofungi
        - Bigyromonadea
    - Bigyra
      - Sagenista
      - Opalozoa
  - Platysulcus tardus

=== Taxonomy ===
Despite the phylogenetic results, Platysulcea has been classified as part of the phylum Bigyra by Cavalier-Smith.

- Class Platysulcea Cavalier-Smith, 2017
  - Order Platysulcida Cavalier-Smith, 2017
    - Family Platysulcidae Shiratori, Nkayama & Ishida, 2015
      - Platysulcus Shiratori, Nkayama & Ishida, 2015
        - P. tardus Shiratori, Nkayama & Ishida, 2015
