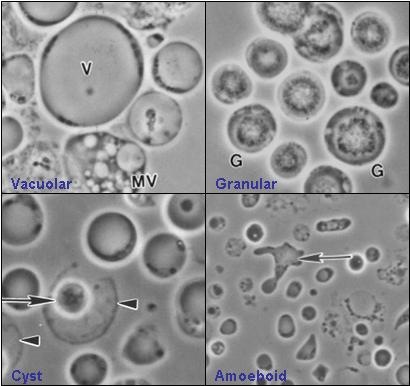

Scientific classification
- Domain: Eukaryota
- Supergroup: Stramenopiles
- Phylum: Bigyra
- Class: Blastocystea
- Order: Blastocystida
- Family: Blastocystidae
- Genus: Blastocystis
- Species: B. hominis

Binomial name
- Blastocystis hominis Brumpt, 1912

= Blastocystis hominis =

Species of protist

Blastocystis hominis is a single-celled eukaryotic organism that inhabits the gastrointestinal tract of humans and various animals. This stramenopile exhibits significant genetic diversity and has become an organism of increasing scientific interest due to its widespread distribution and the emerging understanding of the role of the organism in human health.

Recent molecular studies have identified numerous subtypes, suggesting a complex evolutionary history and host-parasite relationship. The organism is one of the most common intestinal protists in humans, with infection rates reaching up to 100% in some developing regions. While commonly referred to as Blastocystis hominis in humans, the current taxonomic convention recognizes various species and subtypes within the genus Blastocystis, with at least 17 different subtypes identified through molecular analysis.

== Taxonomic history ==
Blastocystis hominis was initially misidentified as a yeast in the early twentieth century and has undergone several taxonomic reclassifications. Alexeieff (1911) initially classified it as a flagellate cyst, but Brumpt (1912) later established it as a distinct organism. Modern molecular phylogenetic analyses have definitively assigned it to Stramenopiles, a diverse group of predominantly photosynthetic organisms. Genetic studies have identified several subtypes, each with different host specificities and potential pathogenic abilities

== Morphology ==
Blastocystis hominis demonstrates tremendous morphological plasticity throughout its life cycle. The vacuolar form, which is most usually seen in laboratory cultures, has a large central vacuole surrounded by peripheral cytoplasm containing the nucleus and other organelles. The granular form appears similar, but it has discrete granules within the central vacuole, which could represent metabolic products or reproductive elements. The amoeboid type has an irregular shape with pseudopod-like extensions and is commonly seen in symptomatic patients. Recent electron microscopy studies have shown sophisticated interior features, such as surface coat variations and organelles that resemble mitochondria.

== Life cycle ==
Blastocystis hominis has a multistage life cycle and is highly adaptable to a variety of host environments. The illness develops when the cyst form is consumed by contaminated food or water. When the cyst enters the colon, it grows into a vacuolar form, which is the key diagnostic stage usually seen in stool samples.

The organism has two separate transmission patterns: external transmission and self-infection. During external transmission, thick-walled cysts discharged in feces can survive in the environment and stay infectious for long periods. These environmentally resistant cysts enhance transmission between hosts via the fecal-oral pathway.

In autoinfection, thin-walled cysts form from the vacuolar form and excyst within the intestine, sustaining infection in the same host. The vacuolar shape can also transform into a multi-vacuolar. It may eventually transform into an amoeboid. The amoeboid stage, while less prevalent, is thought to play a role in pathogenicity.

Binary fission is the principal mode of reproduction, occurring in both vacuolar and amoeboid forms. Under stress conditions, such as unfavorable environmental factors or host immunological responses, the organism can generate pre-cyst stages that eventually develop into mature cysts. This complicated life cycle, with its numerous physical forms, helps the organism colonize and spread to a wide range of host species.

== Clinical significance ==
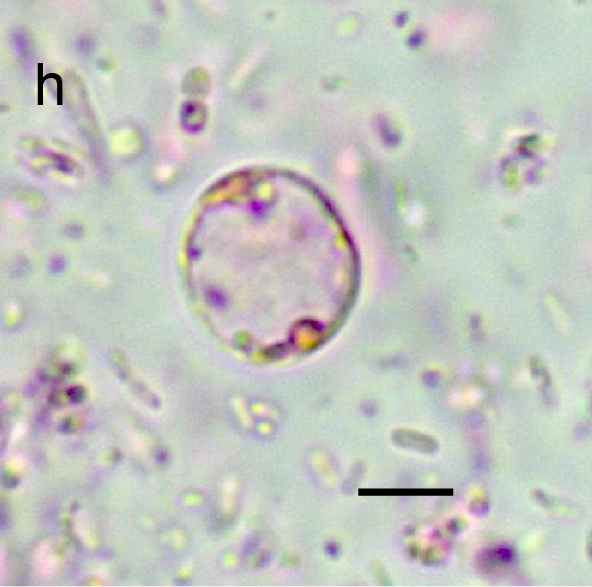
Blastocystis isolated from stool sample of infected patient.

There is still disagreement among scientists on Blastocystis hominis's capacity for pathogenicity. Abdominal pain, recurrent diarrhea, and irritable bowel syndrome (IBS) are among the often reported clinical symptoms. The existence of the organism in a large number of asymptomatic people, however, makes it more difficult to comprehend its potential for pathogenicity. Current diagnostic techniques have progressed from basic microscopy to include molecular tools such as PCR-based techniques, since studies have indicated possible links between Blastocystis infections and changes in the gut microbiota.
