= Opalina ranarum =

Scientific classification
- Domain: Eukaryota
- Supergroup: Stramenopiles
- Phylum: Bigyra
- Class: Opalinea
- Order: Opalinida
- Family: Opalinidae
- Genus: Opalina
- Species: O. ranarum

Binomial name
- Opalina ranarum Dujardin, 1841

Species of protozoan

Opalina ranarum is a species of protozoan belonging to the family Opalinidae, commonly found in the intestines of amphibians such as frogs.

== Morphology ==
Opalina ranarum is a flattened, leaf-like, oval-shaped organism with numerous flagella evenly distributed across its surface. These short flagella, called kinetes, are arranged in parallel rows, enabling the organism to move. The anterior end of O. ranarum features a falx, a cluster of sickle-shaped kinetosomes that serve as the reference point for defining its ventral, dorsal, and lateral regions. In contrast to many other protozoans, O. ranarum lacks a mouth, contractile vacuole, and separate macro and micro nuclei. Instead, it possesses a binucleated or multinucleated forms. It exhibits metachronous movement, starting from the anterior end and following a left-handed spiral path.

== Taxonomy ==
Opalina ranarum shares similar features with flagellates, more specifically the species Karotomorpha bufonis, as O. ranarum contains kinetosomes, mitochondria, nuclear division, and surface folds with microtubules. Thus, Opalinidae should be classified with Protermondidae as this group contains transitional helix within the flagellum. This feature is identified in heterokont flagellates. From that information, Opalina ranarum is classified as a heterokont protist and belongs to the kingdom Chromista, phylum Bigyra, class Opalinae, order Slopalinida, family opalinidae, and genus Opalina. In the encycolpedia of life, O. ranarum is further classified with some attributions. One attribution is that this species is defined as the endoparasite of the common toad (Bufo bufo). This species is also a pathogen of the grass carp (Cenopharyngodon idella).

== Life cycle ==
The life cycle of Opalina ranarum consists of both asexual and sexual reproduction stages. During the asexual stage, the organism divides by binary fission, while in the sexual phase, it produces cysts that are excreted in the frog's feces.
