= Anoecida =

Scientific classification
- Domain: Eukaryota
- Clade: Sar
- Clade: Stramenopiles
- Phylum: Bigyra
- Class: Bikosea
- Superorder: Cyathobodoniae
- Order: Anoecida; Cavalier-Smith, 1997 emend. 2006

Families
- See text

Synonyms
- Caecitellida Cavalier-Smith, 1996

Order of single-celled organisms

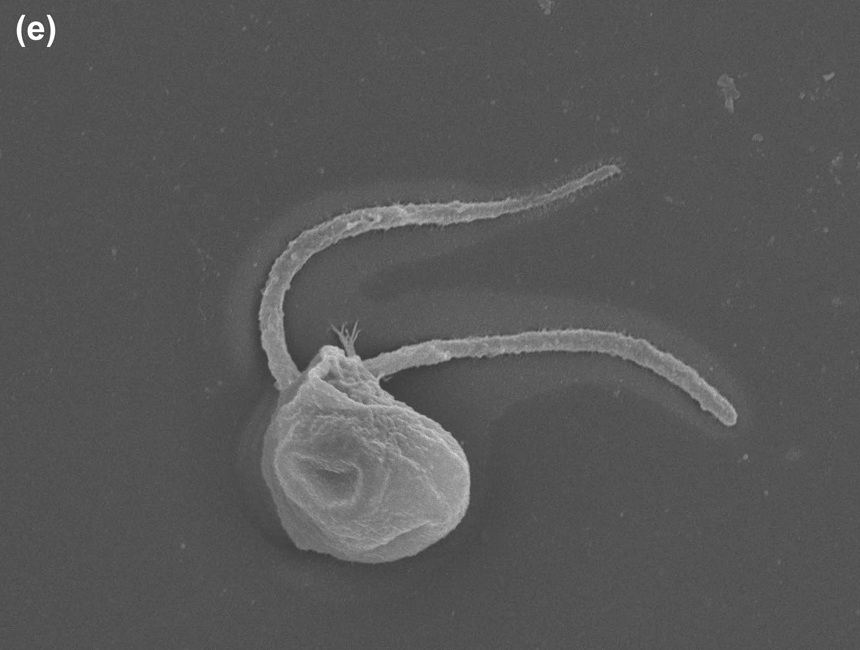
Halocafeteria seosinensis, a halophilic, heterotrophic nanoflagellate isolated from a saltern in Korea. SEM image.

Anoecida is an order of bicosoecids, a small group of unicellular flagellates, included among the heterokonts.

== Classification ==
- Family Caecitellidae Cavalier-Smith 2006
  - Genus Halocafeteria Park, Cho & Simpson 2006
  - Genus Caecitellus Patterson et al. 1993
- Family Cafeteriaceae Moestrup 1995 [Symbiomonadaceae Cavalier-Smith 2006; Anoecaceae Cavalier-Smith 2006]
  - Genus Anoeca Cavalier-Smith, 2006
  - Genus Symbiomonas Guillou & Chrétiennot-Dinet 1999
  - Genus Cafeteria Fenchel & Patterson 1988
