= Zooflagellate =

Type of unicellular eukaryote

Zooflagellates are single-celled eukaryotes with flagella (i.e., flagellates). They are heterotrophic flagellates, as opposed to phytoflagellates, which are photosynthetic. The term "zooflagellate" is also used to refer to reproductive cells or zoospores belonging to multicellular organisms, such as fungi.

== History ==
Zooflagellates
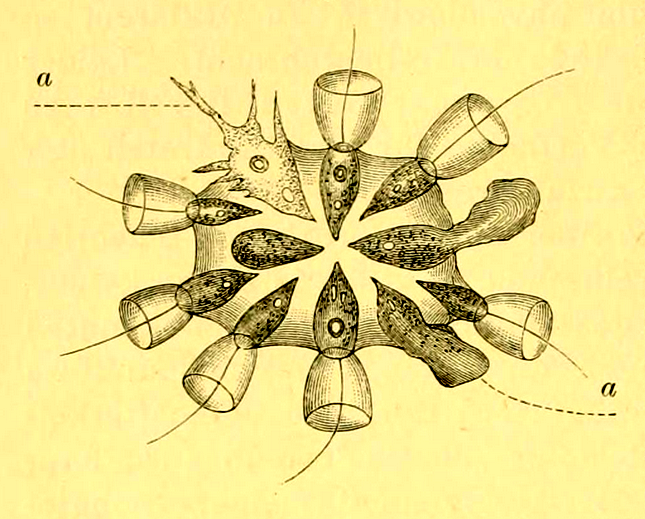
- An illustration of choanoflagellates

Scientific classification (obsolete)
- Domain: Eukaryota
- Kingdom: Protista
- Phylum: Sarcomastigophora
- Subphylum: Mastigophora (flagellates)
- Class: Zoomastigophorea Calkins, 1909

In historical systems of classification during the 20th century, zooflagellates were grouped as a single taxon Zoomastigophora or Zoomastigophorea within the kingdom Protista. It included protists that lack chloroplasts and cell walls and have one or more flagella, but not many as in ciliates or opalines, namely:

- Bicosoecids, composing the order Bicosoecida, distinguished by two unequal flagella. They are currently known as a lineage of Stramenopiles, more closely related to algae such as diatoms than to other zooflagellates.
- Choanoflagellates, then treated as order Choanoflagellida, distinguished by one anterior flagellum surrounded by a collar. They are now known as the lineage most closely related to animals.
- Various orders of metamonads, treated separately at that time: Hypermastigida, Diplomonadida, Oxymonadida, Retortamonadida, Trichomonadida.
- Kinetoplastids, known as order Kinetoplastida at the time, distinguished by one or two flagella and the presence of the kinetoplast. They are closely related to euglenophytes, a group of phytoflagellates.

Over time, with the advancements in phylogenetics and ultrastructure studies, the term "zooflagellate" became obsolete as a formal taxon. Instead, it was adopted as an informal name to refer to any given group of heterotrophic flagellates, regardless of evolutionary relationships.
