= Karotomorpha =

Scientific classification
- Domain: Eukaryota
- Clade: Sar
- Clade: Stramenopiles
- Phylum: Bigyra
- Class: Opalinea
- Order: Slopalinida
- Family: Proteromonadidae
- Genus: Karotomorpha; Travis 1934

Type species
- Karotomorpha bufonis (Dobell 1908) Travis 1934

Species
- K. bufonis (Dobell 1908) Travis 1934 K. swezei (Grassé 1920) Travis 1934

Genus of single-celled organisms

Karotomorpha is a genus of parasites with a flagellum structure. This organism can infect a variety of higher life forms including a number of amphibians. For example, this genus is known to be a parasite of the rough-skinned newt, a widespread newt in the western USA.
