= Rictus =

Rictus may refer to:

- Risus sardonicus (or rictus grin), a spasm of the facial muscles
- Rictus (bicosoecid), a genus of flagellates
- Rictus Erectus, a fictional character
