= Cyathobodoniae =

Scientific classification
- Domain: Eukaryota
- Clade: Sar
- Clade: Stramenopiles
- Phylum: Bigyra
- Order: Bicosoecida
- Clade: Cyathobodoniae; Cavalier-Smith 1993 emend. Cavalier-Smith 2006

Orders
- Anoecales; Bicoecales; Pseudodendromonadales

Superorder of single-celled organisms

Cyathobodoniae is a superorder of bicosoecids, a small group of unicellular flagellates, included among the heterokonts.
