= Eogyrea =

Scientific classification
- Domain: Eukaryota
- Clade: Sar
- Clade: Stramenopiles
- Phylum: Bigyra
- Subphylum: Sagenista
- Class: Eogyrea; Cavalier-Smith 2018
- Order: Eogyrida; Cavalier-Smith 2018

Genera
- Pseudophyllomitus; Mastreximonas; Vomastramonas

Diversity
- 6 species

Class of protists

Eogyrea, formerly described as clade L, is a class of marine heterotrophic single-celled stramenopiles. It is monotypic, with one order Eogyrida. It includes several clades known as MAST (MArine STramenopiles), discovered through sequencing of environmental DNA. Among these, MAST-6 is the only one containing formally described species, distributed in three genera: Pseudophyllomitus, home to four species, and the monotypic genera Mastreximonas and Vomastramonas.
