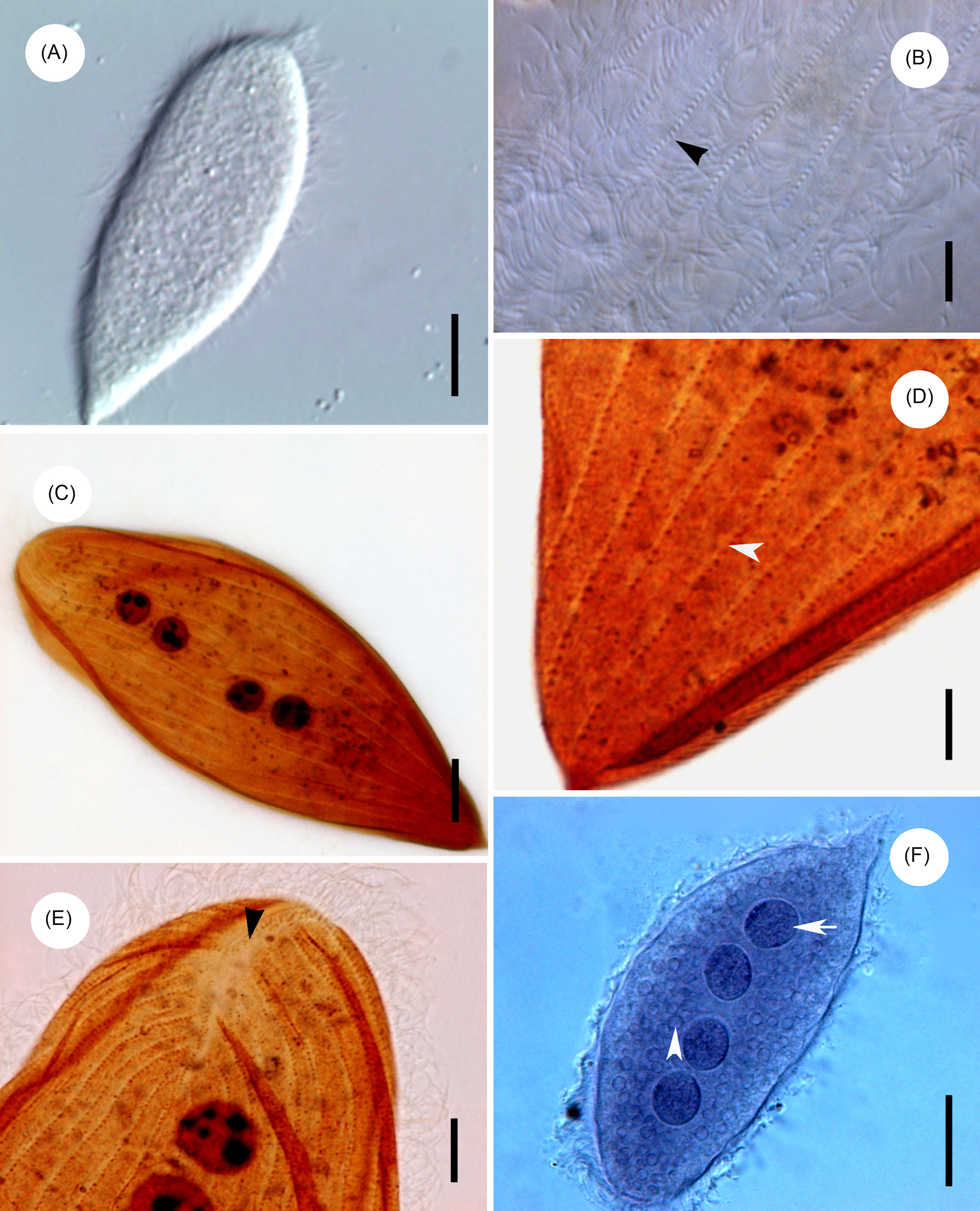
- Protoopalina pingi

Scientific classification
- Domain: Eukaryota
- Clade: Sar
- Clade: Stramenopiles
- Phylum: Bigyra
- Class: Opalinea
- Order: Opalinida
- Family: Opalinidae
- Genus: Protoopalina

= Protoopalina =

Genus of single-celled organisms

Protoopalina is a genus of heterokonts.

Examples are Protoopalina intestinalis and Protoopalina pingi.

Species listed by the Australian Faunal Directory are:

- Protoopalina acuta (Raff, 1911)
- Protoopalina adelaidensis Metcalf, 1923
- Protoopalina australis Metcalf, 1923
- Protoopalina bibronii Metcalf, 1940
- Protoopalina dorsalis (Raff, 1912)
- Protoopalina hylarum (Raff, 1911)
- Protoopalina jonesi Delvinquier, 1987
- Protoopalina papuensis Metcalf, 1923
- Protoopalina polykineta Grim & Clements, 1996
- Protoopalina queenslandensis Delvinquier, 1987
- Protoopalina raffae Delvinquier, 1987
- Protoopalina singeri Delvinquier, 1987
- Protoopalina tenuis (Raff, 1911)
- Protoopalina tronchini Delvinquier, 1987
- Protoopalina waterloti Delvinquier, 1987
