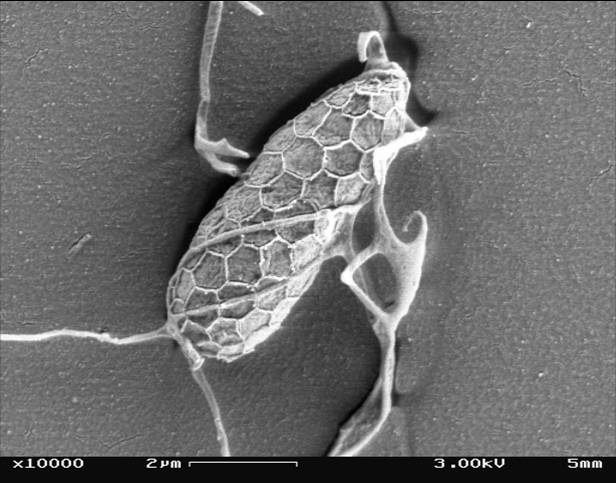
- Aplanochytrium, a labyrinthulid

Scientific classification
- Domain: Eukaryota
- Clade: Sar
- Clade: Stramenopiles
- Phylum: Bigyra
- Subphylum: Sagenista; Cavalier- Smith, 1995 stat. n. 2006

Groups
- Eogyrea; Labyrinthulea

= Sagenista =

Subphylum of single-celled organisms

Sagenista is a subphylum of heterokonts containing the labyrinthulids and Eogyrea, a class of yet uncultured protists. Originally, it contained the Labyrinthulids and bicosoecids. The bicosoecids have been removed, and Eogyrea were added, in order to make the group monophyletic.

Some have a special organelle called a bothrosome (or sagenogenetosome). It is usually found in a marine environments rich in algae and sea grass. It is capable of movement by use of this organelle.

They are generally decomposers. They are cultivated for their active production of Omega-3 fatty acids. These acids are used as an approved additive for animal feed.

There is a debate about whether some species of Sagenista contain the photosynthetic pigment chlorophyll C.

== Bothrosome ==
They are capable of excreting an extoplasmic net of filaments for cells to glide upon. These tiny filaments provide a network for cells to travel upon to soak up nutrients from the surrounding environment.

== Examples ==
- Labyrinthula: Possesses a bothrosome. It is being studied for its pathogenic nature in marine environments. It has caused wasting disease in eelgrass, Zostera marina.

== Bibliography ==
- Gelenter, Wendy; Stowell, Larry J (2003). "Progress in understanding rapid blight of cool-season turf". PACE Turfgrass Research Institute Public Edition. 9: 1–4.
- General Mycology. Dept. of Plant Biology, Washington State University.
- Introduction to the Sagenista. Museum of Paleontology, UC-Berkeley.
- Labyrinthulomycota. Department of Plant Biology, University of Georgia.
- Ralph, Peter J.; Short, Frederick T. (2002). "Impact of the wasting disease pathogen, Labyrinthula zosterae, on the photobiology of Zostera marina". Marine Ecology Progress Series. 226: 265–271. doi:10.3354/meps226265.
- Regan, Casie. Vampire Scientists Study Sea Grass Slime Mold in Florida Bay. National Park Service.
