= Rictus lutensis =

Scientific classification
- Domain: Eukaryota
- (unranked): SAR
- (unranked): Heterokonta
- Class: Bikosea
- Subclass: Rictidia Cavalier-Smith, 2013
- Order: Rictida Cavalier-Smith, 2013
- Family: Rictidae Cavalier-Smith, 2013
- Genus: Rictus Yubuki et al., 2010

Species
- Rictus lutensis Yubuki et al., 2010

Genus of Bikosea, a small group of unicellular flagellates

Rictus is a genus of Bikosea, a small group of unicellular flagellates, included among the heterokonts. The only species in the genus is Rictus lutensis.
