= Proteromonas =

Scientific classification
- Domain: Eukaryota
- Clade: Sar
- Clade: Stramenopiles
- Phylum: Bigyra
- Class: Opalinea
- Order: Proteromonadida
- Family: Proteromonadidae
- Genus: Proteromonas; Kunstler 1883

Synonyms
- "Prowazekella" Aléxéieff 1912

Genus of single-celled organisms

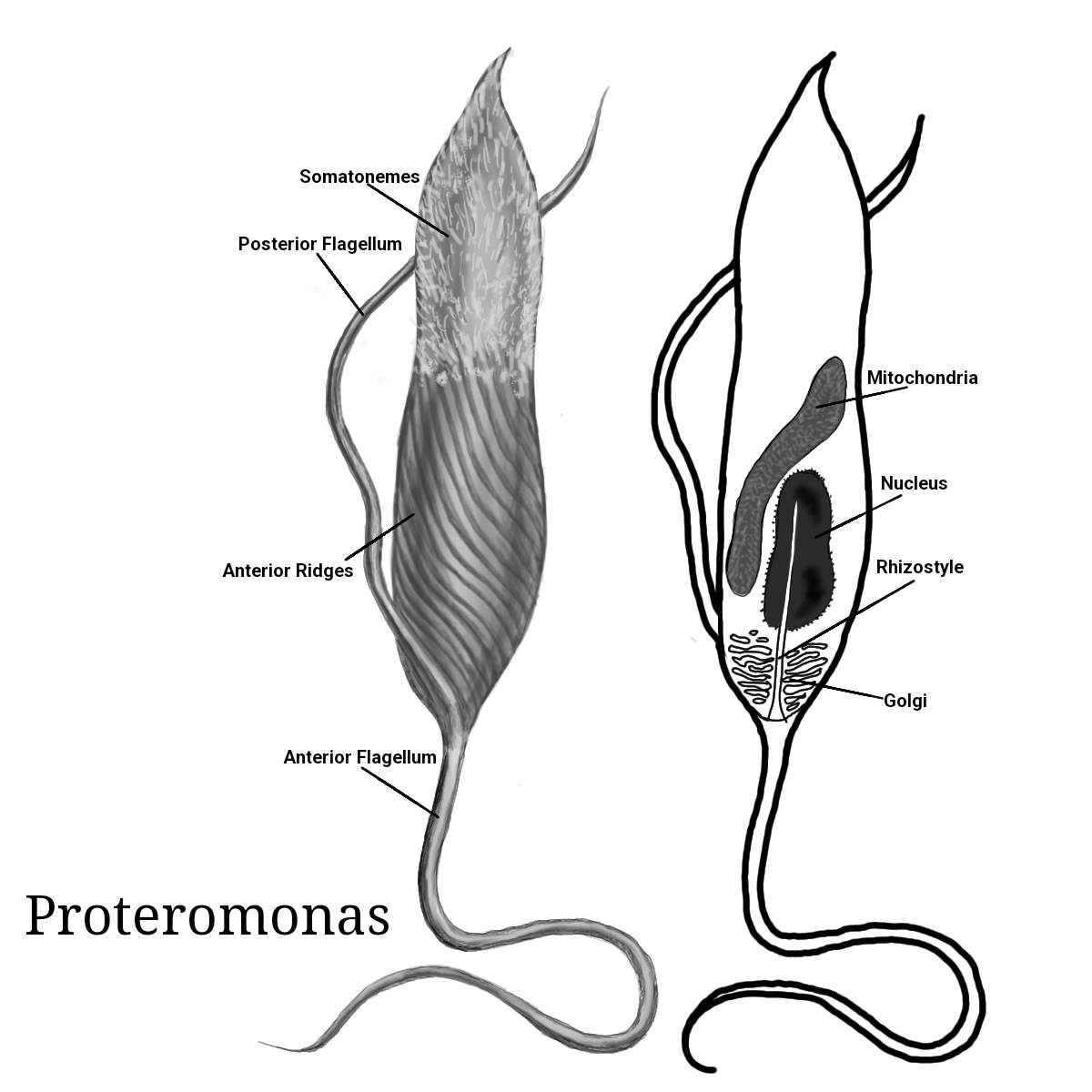
General Morphology of Proteromonas spp.

Proteromonas is a genus of single-celled biflagellated microbial eukaryotes belonging to the superphylum Stramenopiles which are characterized by the presence of tripartite, hair-like structures on the anteriorly-directed larger of the two flagella. Proteromonas on the other hand are notable by having tripartite hairs called somatonemes not on the flagella but on the posterior of the cell. Proteromonas are closely related to Karotomorpha and Blastocystis, which belong to the Opalines group.

Many species of Proteromonas are anaerobic and parasitic and can be found in the intestines of amphibians, reptiles, and mammals. The exact habitat and distribution of Proteromonas may vary depending on the species, but they are generally found as intestinal parasites in small animals. The most common and well-researched species is Proteromonas lacertae, which is a very common parasite found in the rectums of reptiles, mostly lizards.

== Etymology ==
It is unclear where the word "Proteromonas" first emerged, many of the earlier references to this genus are in French and Spanish. In the case of Proteromonas, the name of the genus likely refers to the position of the organism since they were discovered in the rectal entrance of lizards.

The word "monas" comes from the Greek word "μονάς" which means "unit" or "single". The term "monas" is commonly used in scientific terminology as a suffix to denote a single-celled organism or a small, simple organism. The term was first introduced by Ernst Haeckel in 1866, who used the term "monera" to describe the simplest organisms that he believed represented the most primitive form of life. Today, the term "monera" is no longer used as a formal taxonomic group, but the suffix "-monas" is still used to describe certain single-celled organisms, such as bacteria and some protists.

Therefore, the name Proteromonas may reflect the organism's location "in front of" other parasitic organisms found deeper within the intestines of hosts, with the suffix "-monas", which denotes the organism's single-celled nature.

== Type species ==
Proteromonas lacertae

== History of knowledge ==
One of the first mentions of Proteromonads was by Künstler in 1883, though none of his original publications are available online. Before him, the first Proteromonad was described by Grasse in 1879 who named the species Proteromonas lacertae and categorized it under a different genus: Monocercomonas. Then the species was redescribed in 1904 by Prowazek to belong to the genus Bodo. Finally, Alexeieff found a similar species to Proteromonas lacertae in the intestines of Urodeles and united them both under the Genus Hetermita in 1911. Alexeieff then published a complete overhaul of the taxonomy of many protists and finally described Proteromonas as its own genus with species under it in 1912, and in 1946 published a new species P. brevifilia and properly described the genus which allowed for further taxonomic classifications under the Proteromonas genus.

Proteromonas were also once included in the Kinetoplastids groups since they shared many similarities such as a transitional helix, tubular cristae and a rhizoplast that passes from the flagella, through the Golgi and to the nucleus, and mastigonemes (which were later found to be somatonemes). Kinetoplatids are also commonly parasites as well, so Proteromonas was morphologically and characteristically really similar to that group.

Genetic sequencing of subunit ribosomal RNA (SSU rRNA) proved that Proteromonas are descended from the first tubulocristae eukaryote and are also the descendants of some of the most ancestral Stramenopiles. Proteromonas was also largely debated over being included with Stramenopiles due to its lack of tripartite hairs on flagella and instead on the posterior part of the cell body. Proteromonas was also used as a comparison to add Blastocystis to the Stramenopiles since Blastocystis shares very little morphological similarities with Stramenoiples but is very closely related to Proteromonas.

== Habitat and ecology ==
Most species of Proteromonas are parasitic and can be found in the intestines of amphibians, reptiles, and mammals. When Proteromonas infects a reptile, it lives in the gut, where it feeds on the host's nutrients. Whether this actually causes any disease or health effects on the animal has not been determined though some sources say that the intestines of the lizard hosts containing these parasites had their folds destroyed and eroded to the outer wall of the intestine. Not much research has been done on the global effects of this parasite on animal health and population.

Proteromonas is transmitted from one host to another through the blood and feces of infected reptiles, which can contaminate the environment and infect other animals.

The genus is found in many different countries and was found to inhabit many different species of animals. Some countries where Proteromonas was found include Hungary Poland, Romania, Slovakia, India, the United States, Australia, Mexico, and many others. Since Proteromonas is found on virtually all continents, and in many species of animals, it is assumed they are ecologically diverse. The lizard family Lacertidae, in which P. lacertae are commonly found, are diverse all over Afro-Eurasia and live in all sorts of environments. Since Proteromonas are usually found in lizards, their populations are most common in non-polar climates where lizards can survive.

Examples of Proteromonas species and their known hosts:

- P. lacertae in rectum of frog (F. limnocharis).
- P. lacertae in blood of lizards (Acantho-dactylus erythrurus, Darevskia armeniaca, Pristurus carteri) but also many other lizards all over the world.
- P. grassei in the gut of a lizard (Hemidactylus prashadi).
- P. lacertae-viridis also in lizard intestine (Eumeces fasciaius, Phyronosoma cornutum, Scincella laterale, Sceloporus undulius, and Cnemidophorus sexlineatus).
- P. rattusi in rats.
- Also mentions in pigs, porcupines, and many rodents.

== Morphology ==
The basic morphology of Proteromonas is similar to other Stramenopiles with some key differences. It consists of a single, elongated cell that is covered in hair-like projections called somatonemes on the posterior end. Stramenopiles are known to have similar hairs located on the anterior flagella called tripartite hairs or mastigonemes, but in the case of this genus, they cover the cell body. In Stramenopiles the hairs help the cell quickly change direction during locomotion. Whether the displacement of the hairs in the Proteromonas genus affected motility, isn't known. Whether the ancestor of Stramenopiles started with the hairs on the flagella and Proteromonas lost them is a topic of debate.

The anterior part of the cell lacks any hair-like projections, somatonemes, but the membrane is corrugated and ridged. Each ridge is lined with cortical microtubules and myofibrils which prevent somatonemes from attaching to that part of the cell, leaving it bare. The anterior end of the cell also has 2 flagella, one thicker and one thinner and shorter which is also a classic characteristic of Stramenopiles. These flagella are used for both locomotion and feeding, and they create water currents that bring food particles and nutrients toward the cell. The flagella are heterodynamic and lack paraxial rods. The anterior flagellum faces straight away from the cell, and the posterior flagellum is around 3 times the length of the body and sometimes wraps around the cell body and faces towards the posterior side.

The locomotion of the cell was described as "flopping" and the posterior end was very pliable.

The rhizoplast (sometimes called a rhizostyle) is a band-shaped fibre that connects the flagella to the rest of the cell. It looks like a thick band that stretched from the base of the flagella, also called the blepharoplast, towards the nucleus. It is made of 2 microtubules and dense fibre and goes through the kinetosome, the Golgi body, to the surface of the nucleus, and also can connect to the mitochondria. The Golgi apparatus encircles the rhizoplast that passes from the kinetosomes near the surface of the nucleus to the mitochondrion. During the division of the cell, the rhizoplast can also be seen dividing in 2, each connected to a daughter nucleus within one dividing cell.

The nucleus is usually round or ovoid and can be viewed near the flagella at the anterior of the cell. The mitochondria have tubular cristae, several lobes, and a very dense matrix. One single large mitochondrion can be seen next to the nucleus whose location is necessary for the rhizoplast attachment. The mitochondria of Proteromonas are heavily studied due to their resemblance to hydrogenosomes since they are similar to those of other anaerobic eukaryotic parasites. They lack many genes that code for proteins necessary in aerobic mitochondrial respiration like cytochrome oxidase subunits, cytochrome b, and most of the ATP synthase complexes. Unlike other Stramenopiles, Proteromonas have one singular large mitochondrion, whereas stramenopiles typically have many.

Proteromonas has characteristic somatoneme hairs (sometimes called mastigoneme), formed in the Golgi vesicles, and cover the posterior outside layer of the cell. These hairs are the main morphological similarity that links the Proteromonas with Stramenopiles but whether the placement of these hairs has a functional role is unknown.

The shape of the cell differs from species to species. Usually, the measurements are 3 x 13μm but could go up to 25μm. The body shape is elongated with a rounder anterior end that has long ridge lines and a sharper posterior end with tiny hairs covering the surface. Many species include a short narrow, curved spike (1-5 x 2-5μm) which culminates at the posterior end of the cell body.

Proteromonas also can survive in a cyst form. The parasite enters the host as a cyst and remains as one until it reaches its optimal surviving environment, which is towards the end of the digestive tract. Closer to the rectum, Proteromonas would emerge into a flagellated motile form, and live in the host. It has been observed that the area of intestines with the largest amount of flagellated, non-cyst Proteromonas was usually heavily eroded and damaged in the hosts. A large number of Proteromonas cysts are also often found in infected hosts' feces.

The differences between different species are usually minute. Differences can be seen in what animals the species lives in, and slight morphological differences. Length of the cell body and the length of flagella are two small morphological factors. Some Proteromonas like P. hareni have flagella that are similar in length, or P. hemidactyli has flagella of similar thicknesses to other Proteromonas species. In some species like P. hemidactyli, P. hareni, P. ophisauri, the parabasal body is not observed. The posterior spike shape and size also vary greatly between different species and is an important morphological characteristic when describing a potential new Proteromonas.

== Human Interest ==
Proteromonas is of special interest in regards to the phylogeny of Stramenopiles. They are seen as a species link between anaerobic non-motile parasites like Blastocystis spp. and aerobic motile flagellar cells. Due to the anaerobic nature of Proteromonas, the mitochondrion shares many characteristics of a hydrogenosome, which are mitochondria-like organelles found in some eukaryotic cells that live in anaerobic environments. Therefore, the genetic sequences were highly studied and compared to determine the missing links and how hydrogenosomes may have evolved into aerobic mitochondria.

Proteromonas are also very closely related to Blastocystis spp. Which is a human pathogen that lives in the gastrointestinal tract, and is poorly understood. Therefore Proteromonas is often used to describe the human parasite Blasticystis and root its phylogenetic trees.

== List of species ==
Not the full list, many are still currently being described. Original sources for some of the species below aren't available online.

- P. spp (Künstler in 1883)
- P. dolichomastix (Künstler in 1889)
- P. longifila (Lemmermann in 1913)
- P. brevifilia (Aléxéieff in 1946)
- P. hareni (Ray & Singh in 1949)
- P. uromastixi (Janakidevi in 1962)
- P. hystrixi (Todd in 1963)
- P. chameleoni (Krishnamurthy in 1963)
- P. sanjivei (Grewal in 1966)
- P. hemidactyli (Krishnamurthy in 1968)
- P. ophisauri (Chikovani in 1970)
- P. kakatiyae (Bhaskar Rao et al. in 1978)
- P. warangalensis (Bhaskar Rao et al. in 1978)
- P. grassei (Saratchandra & Narasimhamurti in 1980)
- P. waltairensis (Saratchandra & Narasimhamurti in 1980)
- P. ganapatii (Saratchandra in 1981)
- P. krishnamurthyi (Saratchandra & Ramesh Babu in 1982)
- P. rattusi (Kalavathi, Saratchandra & Sambasivarao in 1983)^{20}
- P. mabuiae (Saratchandra, Vijayanand & Venkateswarlu in 1984)
- P. steinii (Ettl in 1984)
- P. regnardi (unknown)
