= Sarcomastigophora =

Scientific classification (obsolete)
- Domain: Eukaryota
- Kingdom: Protista
- Phylum: Sarcomastigophora

Subphyla
- Mastigophora; Sarcodina; Opalinata

The phylum Sarcomastigophora belongs to the Protista or protoctista kingdom and it includes many unicellular or colonial, autotrophic, or heterotrophic organisms. It is characterized by flagella, pseudopodia, or both.

== Taxonomy ==
It is divided into three subphyla: the Mastigophora, the Sarcodina and the Opalinata.

It is polyphyletic, and it is not a universally recognized classification. It places great significance upon method of locomotion in generating the taxonomy.

It can be described either as:

kingdom Protista → phylum Sarcomastigophora

or in older classifications as

phylum Protozoa → subphylum Sarcomastigophora.

== Characteristics ==
It gets its name from the combination of "Sarcodina" (which is an older term used for amoeboids) and "Mastigophora" (which is an older term for flagellates).

The characteristics of phylum sarcomastigophora are :

(1) Nucleus is of one type except in the stages of certain foraminifera.

(2) Locomotory organ either pseudopodia or flagella or both.

(3) Reproduction asexual, but when sexually it is essentially by syngamy

Example : Amoeba, Euglena etc.

== See also ==
- Protozoa
- Foraminifera
- Radiolaria
- Red Tide
- Volvox
