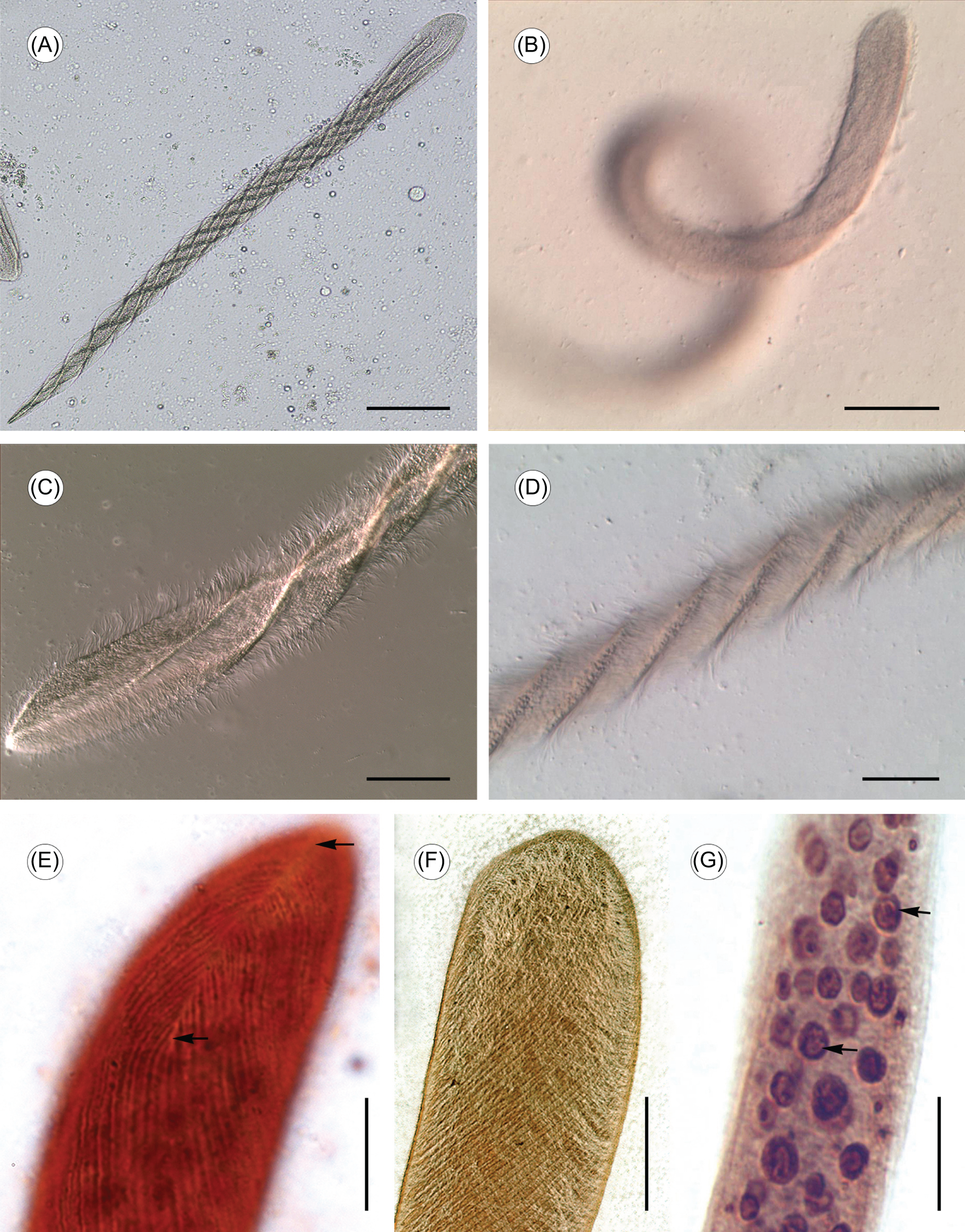
- Cepedea longa

Scientific classification
- Domain: Eukaryota
- Clade: Sar
- Clade: Stramenopiles
- Phylum: Bigyra
- Class: Opalinea
- Order: Opalinida
- Family: Opalinidae
- Genus: Cepedea

= Cepedea =

Genus of single-celled organisms

Cepedea is a genus of opalines within the Stramenopiles.

Examples are Cepedea virguloidea and Cepedea longa. A detailed list of all reported Cepedea species was compiled by Li et al (2017).

== Gallery ==
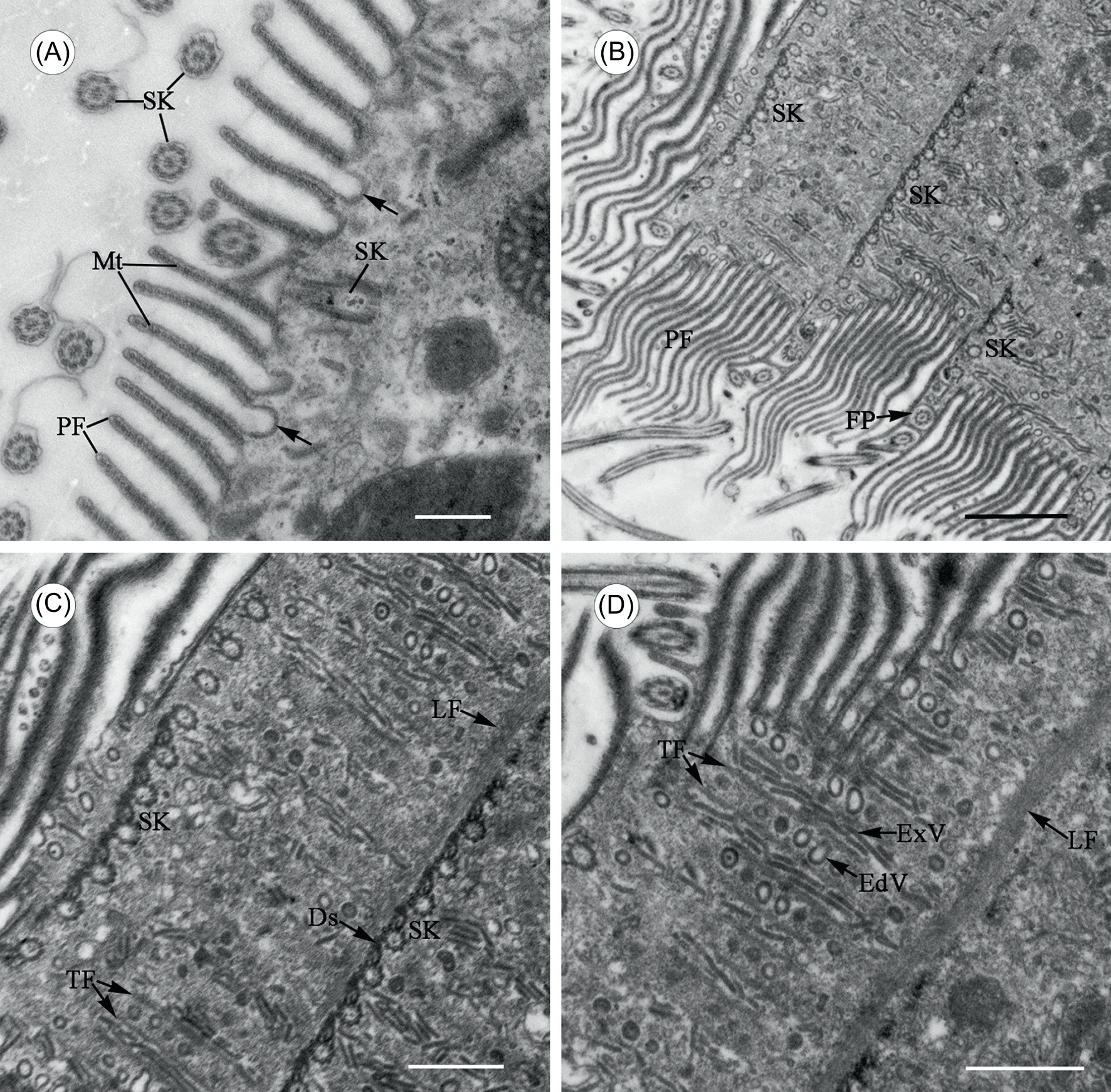
Electron microscopy of Cepedea longa

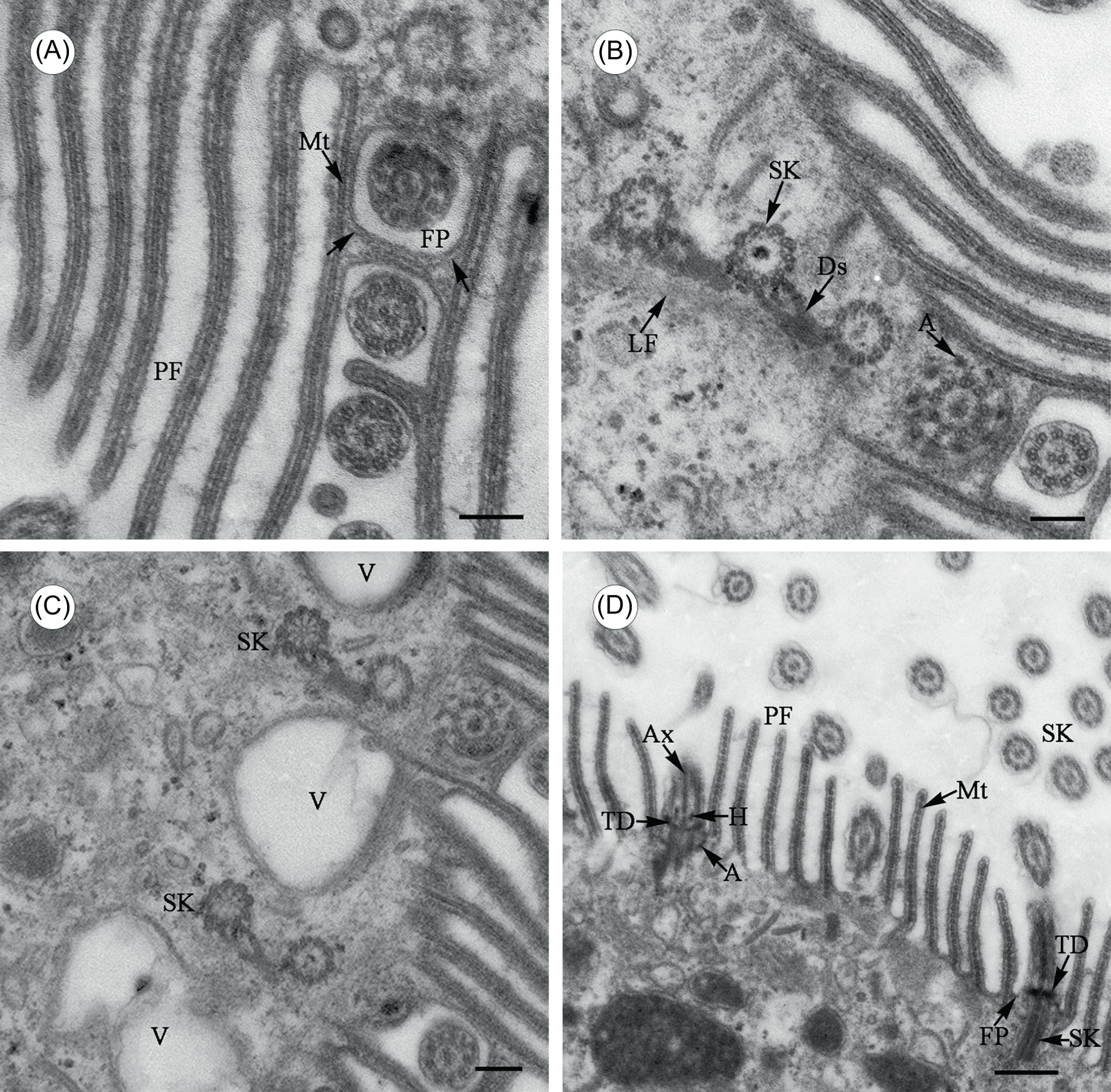
Electron microscopy of Cepedea longa

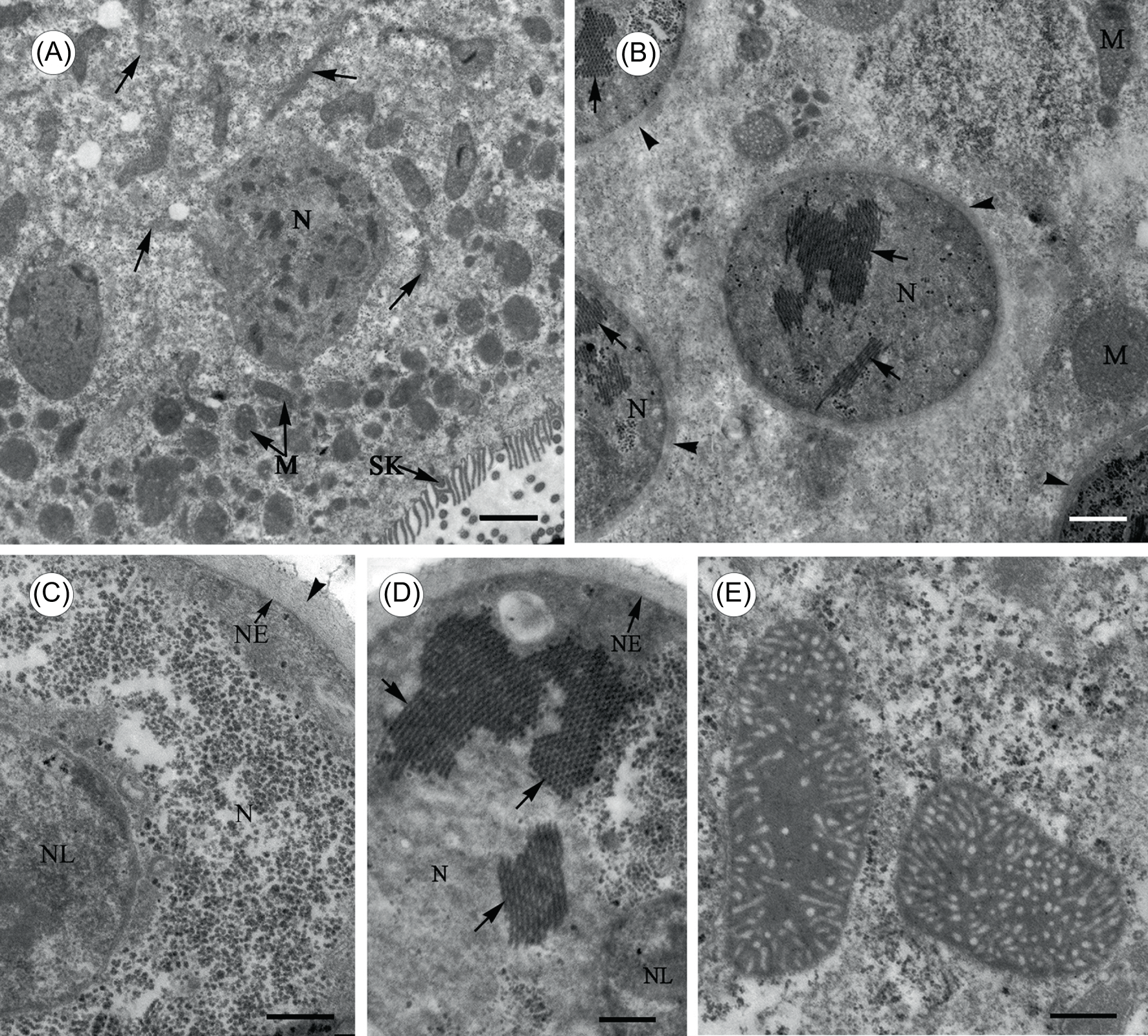
Electron microscopy of Cepedea longa
