= Opalina =

Scientific classification
- Domain: Eukaryota
- Clade: Diaphoretickes
- Clade: Sar
- Clade: Stramenopiles
- Phylum: Bigyra
- Class: Opalinea
- Order: Opalinida
- Family: Opalinidae
- Genus: Opalina; Purkinye & Valentin, 1835

Genus of single-celled organisms

Opalina is a genus of parasitic heterokonts found in the intestines of frogs and toads. They lack mouths and contractile vacuoles, they are covered with nearly equal flagelliform cilia, and they have numerous nuclei, all similar. All the species are obligate endosymbionts, most likely commensal rather than parasitic, in cold-blooded vertebrates. Its body is leaflike in shape. They lack cytostomes. They are saprozoic, consuming dead matter, which suggests their commensal role. They propagate by means of plasmotomy. The body is flattened, leaf-like and oval in outline and covered by thin pellicle. Nutrition is by pinocytosis. There are several small, spherical and similar sized nuclei present in the endoplasm. The nuclei are evenly distributed. The animal reproduces by longitudinal and transverse binary fission, or by plasmotomy in which the cell division is repeated again and again without division of nuclei. The daughter cells encysted and pass out in the faecal matter of the host.

An example of a species is Opalina ranarum.
