= Mastigoneme =

Tubular "hairs" that cover the flagella of algae and assist in movement

Schematic drawing of Cafeteria roenbergensis (Heterokonta: Bicosoecida) with two unequal (heterokont) flagella: an anterior straminipilous (with tubular tripartite mastigonemes) and a posterior smooth

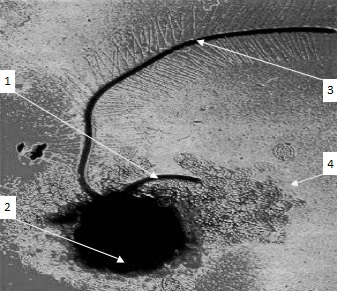
A chrysomonad (Heterokonta: Chrysophyceae) under TEM, with a smooth flagellum (1) and a long flagellum covered with mastigonemes (3)

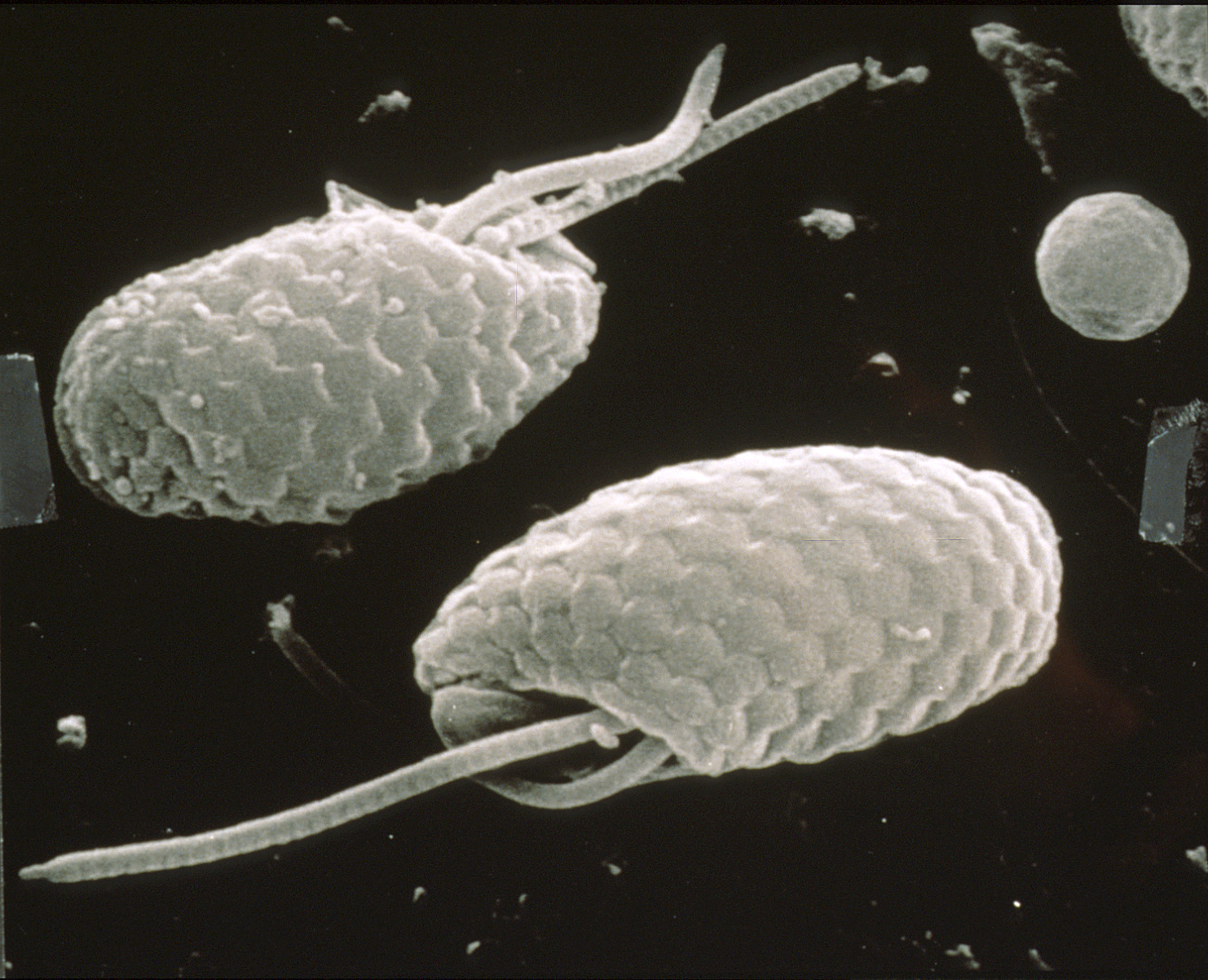
Two cryptomonads (Cryptophyceae) under SEM. Mastigonemes not visible.

Mastigonemes are lateral "hairs" that attach to protistan flagella. Flimsy hairs attach to the flagella of euglenid flagellates, while stiff hairs occur in stramenopile and cryptophyte protists. Stramenopile hairs are approximately 15 nm in diameter, and usually consist of flexible basal part that inserts into the cell membrane, a tubular shaft that itself terminates in smaller "hairs". They reverse the thrust caused when a flagellum beats. The consequence is that the cell is drawn into the water and particles of food are drawn to the surface of heterotrophic species.

Typology of flagella with hairs:

- whiplash flagella (= smooth, acronematic flagella): without hairs but may have extensions, e.g., in Opisthokonta
- hairy flagella (= tinsel, flimmer, pleuronematic flagella): with hairs (= mastigonemes sensu lato), divided in:
  - with fine hairs (= non tubular, or simple hairs): occurs in Euglenophyceae, Dinoflagellata, some Haptophyceae (Pavlovales)
  - with stiff hairs (= tubular hairs, retronemes, mastigonemes sensu stricto), divided in:
    - bipartite hairs: with two regions. Occurs in Cryptophyceae, Prasinophyceae, and some Heterokonta
    - tripartite (= straminipilous) hairs: with three regions (a base, a tubular shaft, and one or more terminal hairs). Occurs in most Heterokonta/Stramenopiles

Observations of mastigonemes using light microscopy dates from the nineteenth century. Considered artifacts by some, their existence would be confirmed with electron microscopy.
