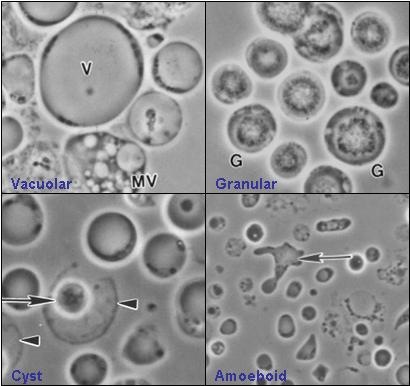

Scientific classification
- Domain: Eukaryota
- Clade: Sar
- Clade: Stramenopiles
- Phylum: Bigyra
- Superclass: Opalinata
- Class: Blastocystea; Zierdt et al., 1976
- Order: Blastocystida; Zierdt et al., 1976
- Family: Blastocystidae; Jiang and He, 1988
- Genus: Blastocystis (Alexieff, 1911) Brumpt, 1912
- Species: B. hominis

Binomial name
- Blastocystis hominis Brumpt, 1912

= Blastocystis =

Genus of single-celled organisms

Blastocystis is a genus of single-celled parasites belonging to the Stramenopiles that includes algae, diatoms, and water molds. There are several species, living in the gastrointestinal tracts of species as diverse as humans, farm animals, birds, rodents, reptiles, amphibians, fish, and cockroaches. Blastocystis has low host specificity, and many different species of Blastocystis can infect humans, and by current convention, any of these species would be identified as Blastocystis hominis.

Blastocystis is one of the most common human parasites in the world and has a global distribution. It is the most common parasitic infection in the United States, where it infected approximately 23% of the total population during year 2000. In less developed areas, infection rates as high as 100% have been observed. High rates of infection are found in individuals in developed countries who work with animals. Although the role of Blastocystis hominis in human disease is often referred to as controversial, a systematic survey of research studies conducted by 11 infectious disease specialists from nine countries, found that over 95% of papers published in the 10 years prior identified it as causing illness in immunocompetent individuals. The paper attributed confusion over pathogenicity to the existence of asymptomatic carriers, a phenomenon the study noted is common to all gastrointestinal protozoa. However, Blastocystis has never fulfilled Koch's postulate that infection of a healthy individual with Blastocystis leads to disease. The fact that Blastocystis' infection route is oral-anal indicates that carriers have been in contact with faecal contaminated matter which might have included other intestinal pathogens that explain the observed symptoms. A more likely explanation is the presence of virulent and non-virulent strains since there exists an enormous genetic variation between different strains (or genotypes). See the genotype paper by Rune Stensvold and the 2017 Blastocystis genome paper expanding on this diversity. An alternative theory that Blastocystis is not a pathogen at all has recently been strengthened based on its biochemistry.

A 2024 study found that the presence of Blastocystis was found with individuals with higher plant consumption and associated with lower obesity, better cardiovascular health, and less metabolic abnormalities. Diet modification in participants that led to a reduction in obesity also led to greater amounts of Blastocystis.

== Classification ==
The current protozoan classification of Blastocystis was only resolved in 2007. The original description of Blastocystis was as a yeast due to its yeast-like glistening appearance in fresh wet mounts and the absence of pseudopodia and locomotion. This was then contradicted by Zierdt, who reclassified it under subphylum Sporozoa (and later in Sarcodina), based on some distinctive protistan features of the Blastocystis cell. Its sensitivity to antiprotozoal drugs and its inability to grow on fungal media further indicated that it was a protozoan.

Major revisions had been made to its classification. An analysis of gene sequences was performed in 1996, which placed it into the group Stramenopiles. Other Stramenopiles include brown algae, mildew, diatoms, the organism that caused the Great Famine of Ireland, and the organism responsible for sudden oak death disease. However, the position of Blastocystis within the stramenopiles remains enigmatic.

== Signs and symptoms ==
Most published studies have reported that between 50% and 80% of individuals mono-infected with Blastocystis will show symptoms. Factors influencing presentation of symptoms have been listed as the patient's age, with younger patients less likely to show symptoms, as well as genetic changes that influence the production of cytokines. Some studies have suggested that pathogenicity may be linked to specific subtypes of Blastocystis and experimental infection of animals has reported varying degrees of illness depending on the subtype used. While some subtypes appear to be less likely to result in symptomatic infection, those subtypes are also found in symptomatic individuals who have no other infection found. Symptoms associated with the infection are diarrhea, constipation, nausea, abdominal cramps, bloating, excessive gas, and anal itching. Most cases of the infection appear to become diagnosed as irritable bowel syndrome (IBS), according to studies from Denmark, Pakistan, the United Kingdom, and Italy. The timescale of infection with the parasite can range from weeks to years. In the early 2000s, Egyptian physicians identified 84 patients with diarrhea and enteritis apparently caused by Blastocystis hominis. After three days of nitazoxanide treatment, symptoms cleared and no fecal organisms were detectable in 36 (86%) of 42 treated patients and in 16 (38%) of 42 people who received placebo (P < .0001). The investigators concluded that either B. hominis is pathogenic and can often be effectively treated with nitazoxanide, or that nitazoxanide (a drug approved by the FDA for the treatment of giardia and cryptosporidia) eradicated an unidentifiable organism.

== Taxonomy ==
For many years, scientists believed one species of Blastocystis infected humans, while different species of Blastocystis infected other animals. So they called Blastocystis from humans Blastocystis hominis and gave different species names to Blastocystis from other animals, for example Blastocystis ratti from rats. In recent years, various genetic analysis have shown that Blastocystis hominis as a unique entity does not exist, i.e. there is no single species of Blastocystis that infects humans.

In fact, a number of distinct genetic types of Blastocystis can infect humans, including those previously called Blastocystis ratti and the differences are so great that they could be considered separate species. Because of this, in 2007 scientists proposed discontinuing the use of the term Blastocystis hominis. Their proposal was to refer to Blastocystis from humans and animals as Blastocystis sp. subtype nn where nn is a number assigned to each group according to the degree of genetic identity of the Blastocystis organisms, based on gene sequences, rather than the host that was infected. At that time nine subtypes were known to infect mammals and birds, all of which had been found in humans.

A tenth group was reported in China in 2007, but a full analysis of its relationships has not yet been performed and it is not yet clear whether it is a group within a described subtype or a new subtype. A definite tenth subtype was then found in a variety of other mammals, including primates, but it has not as yet been found in humans.

There are now at least 13 genetically distinct small subunit ribosomal RNA lineages. These additional subtypes were found in a variety of mammalian hosts (including elephants and giraffes) and it is very likely that more subtypes will be found as more hosts are surveyed.

== Epidemiology ==
Blastocystis spp. prevalence in humans often exceeds 5% in industrialized countries. In the United States, it infected approximately 23% of the total population during year 2000. In less developed areas, infection rates with one or more subtypes are as high as 100%.

=== Transmission ===
Fecal-oral transmission is the most accepted pathway, and recent studies have shown that transmission involves only the cyst form of the parasite. The extent to which human–human, human–animal, and animal–human transmission occurs is still unknown. Genomic studies provide evidence for all three routes, though experimental studies have yet to provide conclusive proof for the existence of either.

=== Reservoir ===
Conclusively stating that Blastocystis has an animal reservoir depends upon unraveling the true nature of its transmission. If, as Noël et al. deem likely based upon their own molecular work and a review of the literature, animal-to-human transmission is possible, then animals such as pigs and dogs could in fact be acting as a large reservoir capable of human infection. Epidemiological studies finding that infection is more common in people living in proximity to farm animals or pets further supports this notion.

== Morphology ==
Blastocystis has various morphological forms.

Four commonly described forms are the vacuolar (otherwise known as central body), granular, amoeboid, and cyst forms. The appearance of the organism is largely dependent upon environmental conditions as it is extremely sensitive to oxygen. Whether all of these forms exist in the host intestine is unclear.

Vacuolar form

The vacuolar form is the typical cell form of Blastocystis seen in culture and is often used for the identification of the organism. These vacuolar forms vary greatly in size, with diameters ranging between 2 μm and 200 μm. The vacuolar form is otherwise known as central body form because it has a large central vacuole surrounded by a thin band of peripheral cytoplasm which contains other organelles. Flocculent material has been described as being scattered unevenly throughout the vacuole. The function of the vacuole is still unclear, however, it has been suggested that, like for many eukaryotic cells, it is for storage purposes. Other functions, such as cell division during reproduction and the deposition of apoptotic bodies, have been proposed, although more tests need to be done to validate these roles.

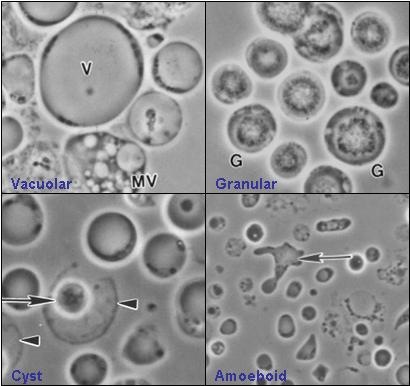
Four common forms of Blastocystis hominis. Clockwise from top left: vacuolar, granular, amoeboid, and cyst forms.

Granular form

The granular form is somewhere and somewhat morphologically similar to the vacuolar forms except that distinct granules are observed in the central vacuole and / or cytoplasm. Within the central vacuole, these granules appear in different forms too. Three types were suggested – metabolic, lipid, and reproductive granules. Metabolic granules play a role in chemical processes that are necessary for the maintenance of life in the organism. It was also put forward that reproductive granules were involved in the development of progeny cells. These hypotheses were made based on microscopy alone, which may be deemed misleading, hence more need to be done before making a definite conclusion. It has also been suggested that the granules may be an indication that the cell is dying.

Amoeboid form

The other form that exists is the amoeboid form. The amoeboid form of Blastocystis is non-motile and strongly adhesive. A research study has reported that amoeboid forms are produced only in cultures taken from symptomatic individuals, with asymptomatic individuals producing exclusively vacuolar forms. The study suggested this method could be used for diagnosing symptomatic infection. Additionally, it suggested the symptoms could be due to the accumulation of the strongly adhesive amoeboid forms on the host's intestinal wall. A detailed ultra-structural study of amoeboid forms was published in 2007.

Cyst form

The Blastocystis cyst form is a more recent discovery and has helped in the advancement of understanding the way the infection is transmitted. As compared to the other forms, it is generally smaller in size and has a thick multilayered cyst wall. It lacks a central vacuole and few nuclei, multiple vacuoles and food storage deposits were observed. The cyst form is the most resistant form of this parasite and is able to survive in harsh conditions because of its thick multilayered cyst wall. Experiments have been carried out to show its ability to withstand acidic gastric juices. Besides, the cysts did not lyse when placed in distilled water and could survive well at room temperature for up to 19 days, indicating its strong resistance.

== Life cycle ==
The supposed life cycle begins with ingestion of the cyst form. After ingestion, the cyst develops into other forms which may in turn re-develop into cyst forms. Through human faeces, the cyst forms enter the external environment and are transmitted to humans and other animals via the faecal–oral route, repeating the entire cycle.

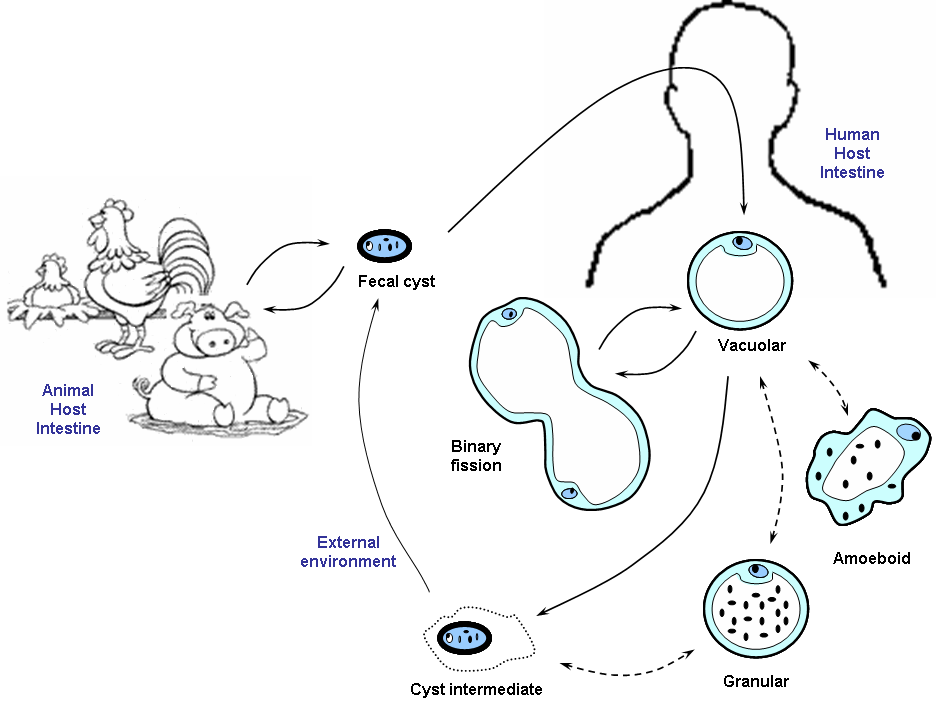
Life cycle of Blastocystis proposed by Tan

== Obtaining and culturing Blastocystis ==
The ATCC maintains a collection of Blastocystis isolates. Some records show whether the isolates were obtained from symptomatic or asymptomatic carriers. As yet, no publication has identified the subtypes of most of the ATCC isolates, which are mostly axenic. Researchers have reported that patients with irritable bowel syndrome may provide a reliable source for xenic Blastocystis isolates. Some researchers have reported being able to culture Blastocystis from 46% of IBS patients. Researchers have described different culture mechanisms for growing Blastocystis. Colony growth on solid medium colonies on solid culture medium using a synthetic medium with added supplements have both been described. However, most cultivation is performed in liquid media of various types.

== See also ==
- Blastocystosis
- List of parasites (human)
