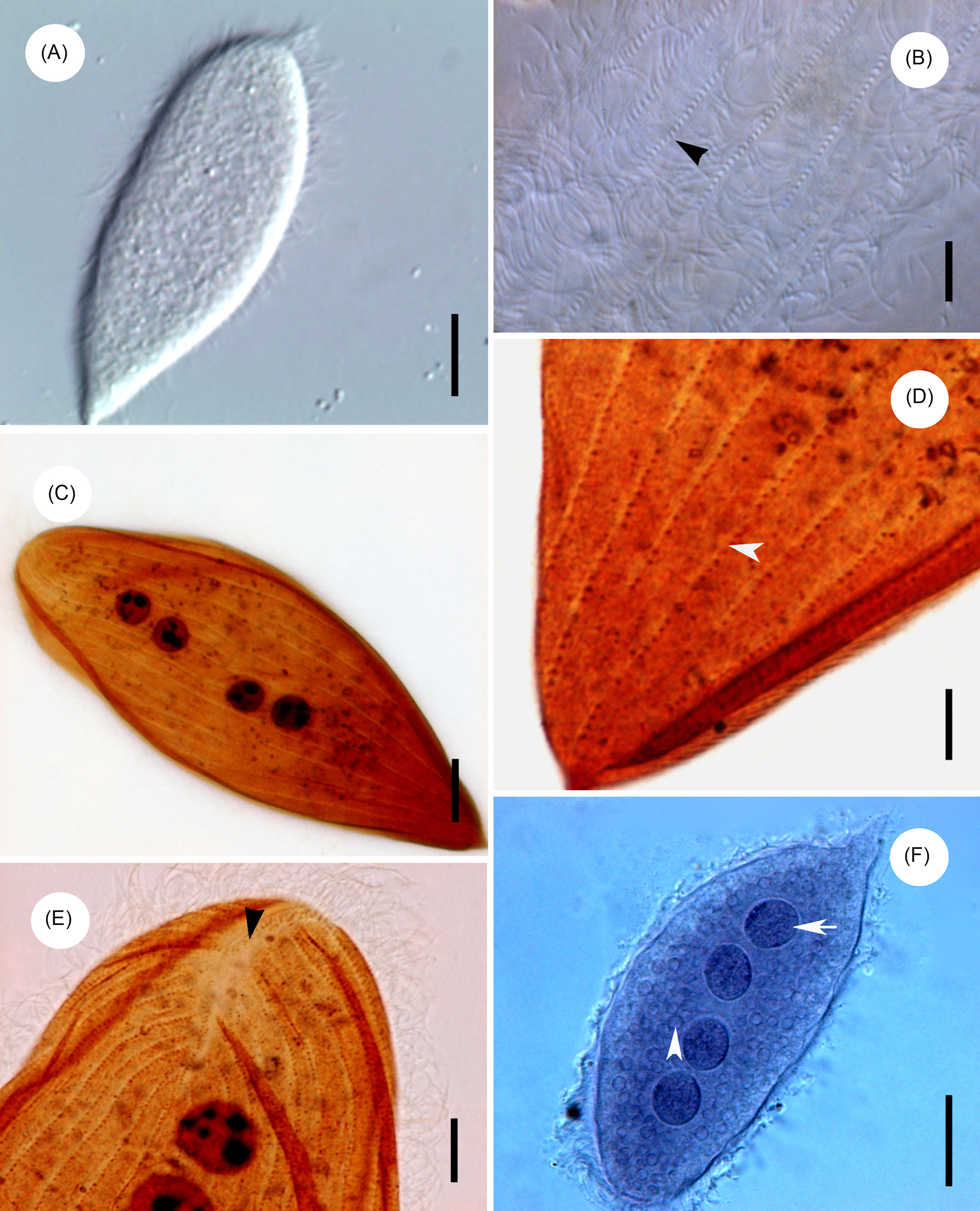
- Protoopalina pingi

Scientific classification
- Domain: Eukaryota
- Clade: Sar
- Clade: Stramenopiles
- Phylum: Bigyra
- Class: Opalinea
- Order: Opalinida
- Family: Opalinidae; Claus 1874

Genera
- Cepedea; Opalina; Protoopalina; Protozelleriella; Zelleriella

= Opalinidae =

Small group of peculiar heterokonts

The opalines are a small group of peculiar heterokonts, currently assigned to the family Opalinidae, in the order Slopalinida. Their name is derived from the opalescent appearance of these microscopic organisms when illuminated with full sunlight. Most opalines live in the large intestine and cloaca of anurans (frogs and toads), though they are sometimes found in fish, reptiles, molluscs and insects; whether they are parasitic is not certain. The unusual features of the opalines, first observed by Antonie van Leeuwenhoek in 1683, has led to much debate regarding their phylogenetic position among the protists.

== Taxonomy and phylogeny ==
The relationship between opalines and other protists has been a subject of great controversy since the late 19th century, and is not completely resolved at present. Initially, microscopists believed that the thousands of rhythmically beating hair-like structures which cover their surface were cilia, and they placed the opalines in Ciliophora. In the early 20th century other aspects of opaline biology clearly differentiated them from the ciliates and they were placed in Sarcomastigophora, with the amoebae and flagellates. In the 1980s, detailed ultrastructural studies of Opalina ranarum revealed that they share many features with the heterokonts of the family Proteromonadidae. A new order—Slopalinida Patterson 1985—was proposed to include the members of the families Proteromonadidae Grassé 1952 and Opalinidae Claus 1874. In 2004, the first reliable opaline genetic sequence data supported the monophyletic nature of the order Slopalinida. The authors of that study considered the opalines to be a family (Opalinidae) within the order Slopalinida.

There are currently about 200 recognized species of opalines in 5 genera: Opalina Purkinje and Valentin 1835, Protoopalina Metcalf 1918, Cepedea Metcalf 1920, Zelleriella Metcalf 1920, and Protozelleriella Delvinquier et al. 1991. Two additional genera, Hegneriella Earl 1971 and Bezzenbergeria Earl 1973, have not been considered as valid by subsequent authors (p. 249) The 5 recognized genera differ in terms of the number of nuclei, the appearance and location of the falx (two short, sickle-shaped rows of flagella), and whether the long rows of flagella (called "kineties") cover the body evenly or if there is a "bald spot". Due to the differences in body shape among the different life cycle stages within a species, the use of overall body shape - whether flat or cylindrical - to differentiate the genera has been de-emphasized.

== Life cycle ==
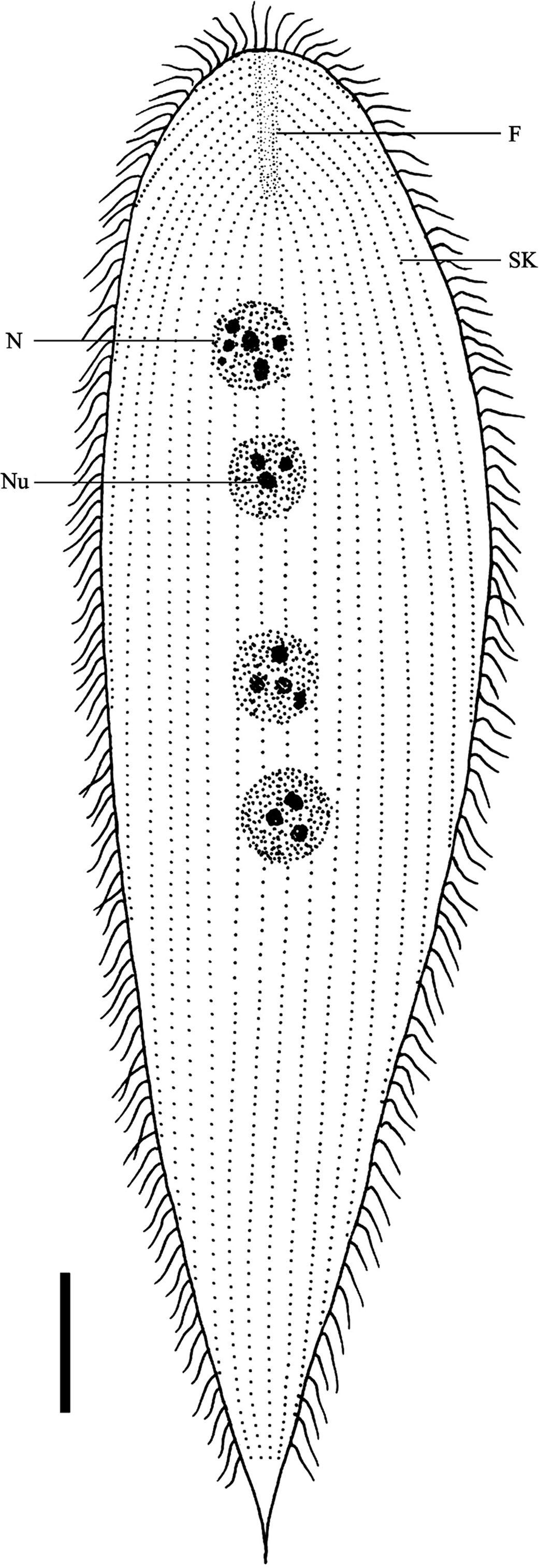
Protoopalina pingi from the recta of the frogs Sylvirana guentheri and Pelophylax nigromaculatus

Like many parasites, the life cycle of opalines is rather complex . The most comprehensive study published so far concluded that the life cycles of 10 Opalina species, 1 Zelleriella species and 1 Protoopalina species are all "remarkably similar" (p. 321). A more recent study found that Cepedea couillardi fits the standard opaline life cycle model described below, while that of Opalina proteus is completed entirely in the tadpole stage of the host. Very little is known about the life cycles of opalines in fish, reptile or arthropod hosts.

Asexual phase in adult anuran host. The basic opaline life cycle begins with the large, multinucleate trophonts in the adult anuran cloaca. Through much of the year, the trophonts grow and divide continually to yield more trophonts. Nuclear divisions maintain the appropriate number of nuclei during this phase. As the host's breeding season approaches, the trophonts enter a phase known as palintomy — a series of cell divisions with little or no overall growth or nuclear divisions. The resulting opalines, which become gradually smaller with fewer nuclei per individual, are called tomonts. At some point the small tomonts undergo encystment, and the cysts are released into the environment (i.e. the breeding pool of the anuran host) along with the feces.

Sexual and asexual phases in larval anuran host. Once cysts are eaten by foraging tadpoles, they excyst (hatch) to yield gamonts. The gamonts divide further, including a meiotic division, to yield haploid gametes. Each gamete has only one nucleus and may be either a microgamete or a macrogamete. Conjugation occurs between one microgamete and one macrogamete, to yield a diploid zygocyst with one nucleus. The zygocyst has two possible fates. It may be shed along with the feces of the tadpole host; and if eaten by another tadpole, it will excyst (hatch) to yield more gamonts in the new host. Alternatively, the zygocyst may excyst in its original host and grow into a multinucleate protrophont. In this case, the protrophont grows into a trophont and the whole cycle starts over again. The cycle from protrophont to cyst may occur in either the tadpole or adult hosts. Some evidence suggests that the life cycle transitions of opalines may be governed by the hormonal cycles of the host.

== Hosts and commensal lifestyle ==
Lacking a mouth, opalines feed by taking in nutrients from their surroundings by pinocytosis. While the opalines are often referred to as "parasites", two lines of evidence suggest that they are actually commensals which do no harm to their anuran hosts.

1. They are found almost exclusively in the large intestine and cloaca. Since the anuran absorbs the nutrients from its food in the small intestine, the opalines are probably not depriving their hosts of nutrients. It is believed that the opalines are simply living off the "left-over" nutrients in the feces, possibly supplemented by the biochemical contributions of the rich bacterial flora which also reside there.
2. Anuran hosts containing many thousands of opalines appear to be completely healthy, with no obvious irritation or other pathological signs on their intestinal or cloacal walls.

Only about a dozen reports of opalines in fishes have been published, and even fewer on opalines from reptile or salamander hosts. Their scarcity outside of anuran hosts had led many to speculate that the others are just incidental infestations—maybe the infested snake had just eaten an infested frog, for example. However, opalines have been found in saltwater fish which have no access to anurans. Also, the populations of opalines in fish hosts are often very high, suggesting that they are probably reproducing in the fish host.

The pathogenicity (if any) of opalines in fish hosts is not yet known. One study found no irritation or other pathological signs on the rectal epithelium of Symphysodon aequifasciata infested with Protoopalina symphysodonis, but stated that "most infected animals died".

== In vitro culture of opalines ==
Successful culturing of opalines in artificial media for periods of 1 month or more has been reported. This technique will aid tremendously in future studies of all aspects of opaline biology.
