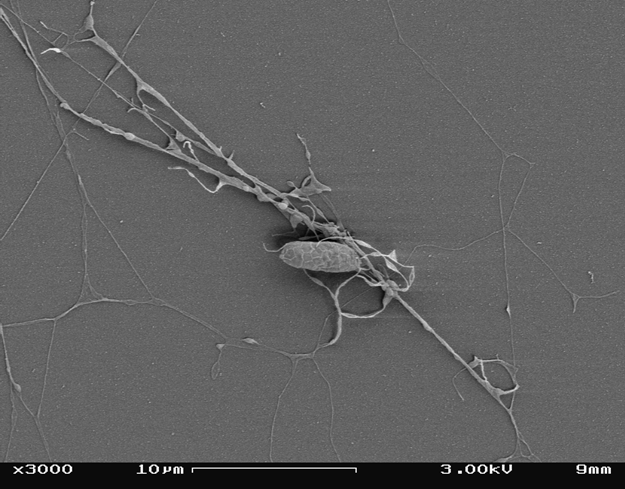
- Aplanochytrium, SEM showing one vegetative cell and extended ectoplasmic network.

Scientific classification
- Domain: Eukaryota
- Clade: Sar
- Clade: Stramenopiles
- Phylum: Bigyra; Cavalier-Smith 1998, emend. 2006

Classes
- Opalozoa; Placidozoa; "Wobblata"; Placididea; Nanomonadea; Opalomonadea; Opalinata; Opalinea; Blastocystea; Bikosia; Bikosea; Sagenista; Labyrinthulomycetes; Eogyrea

= Bigyra =

Phylum of single-celled organisms

Bigyra (from Latin bi- 'twice' and gyrus 'circle') is a phylum of microscopic eukaryotes that are found at the base of the Stramenopiles clade. It includes three well-known heterotrophic groups Bicosoecida, Opalinata and Labyrinthulomycetes, as well as several small classes initially discovered through environmental DNA samples: Nanomonadea, Placididea, Opalomonadea and Eogyrea. The classification of Bigyra has changed several times since its origin, and its monophyly remains unresolved.

== Ecological diversity ==
Bigyra is a diverse group of heterotrophic, mainly phagotrophic stramenopiles that lack cell walls. It contains three well-known important groups with widely different ecological functions and morphologies: labyrinthulomycetes, opalines and bicosoecids.

Labyrinthulomycetes is a group of protists that absorb nutrients in an osmotrophic or phagotrophic manner. They can behave either as free-living amoebae or as mycelium-like networks of cytoplasmic threads. Some of them are saprotrophic decomposers of the detrital food web; as such, they play a role in making organic matter more accessible to other organisms. Others are parasitic, and others are predators of bacteria. They are cosmopolitan, ubiquitous in marine, freshwater and estuarine environments. They live in association with algae, marine plants and detritus.

Opalinata is a diverse assemblage of modified parasitic protists known as 'opalines'. They inhabit the intestines of various animals, primarily amphibians. They are found on every continent. Among them, the opalinids are highly unusual protists: their large cells have numerous flagella and from two to hundreds of nuclei. Their cell surface is delicately folded, giving it an iridescent appearance (hence their name, a reference to the iridescent opal). Another important group of opalines is Blastocystis, a prevalent parasite of humans and other animals.

Bicosoecida is a small group that contains free-living marine and freshwater nanoflagellates that feed on bacteria. They are present in every ecosystem, including extreme environments such as the deep sea or salt flats. They play a crucial role in the microbial food web by composing the link between bacteria and higher trophic levels. They are also important in biogeochemical cycles by remineralizing the nutrients. Their classification has changed multiple times over the years, and is still an unresolved issue.

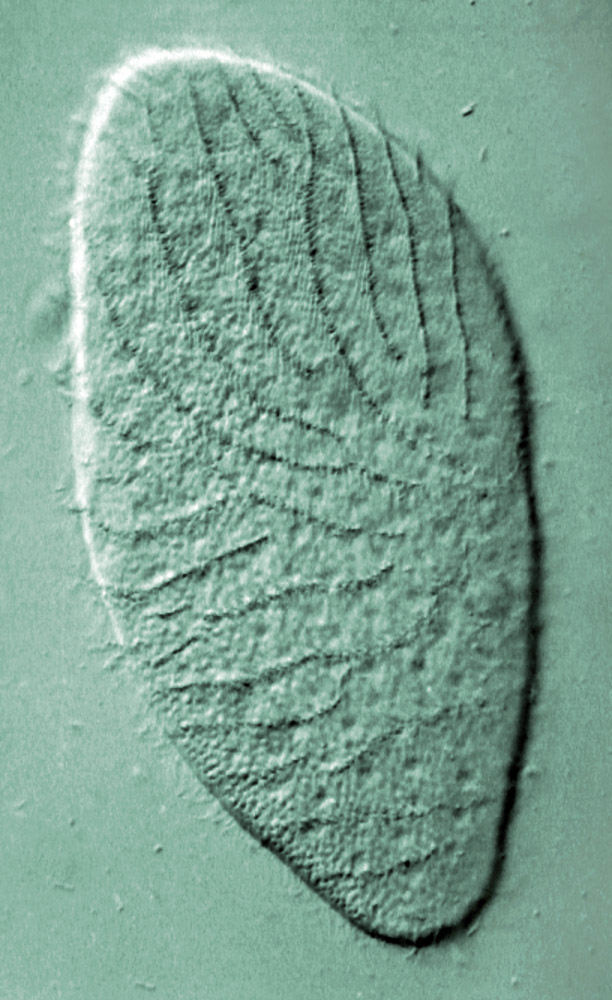
Opalinid

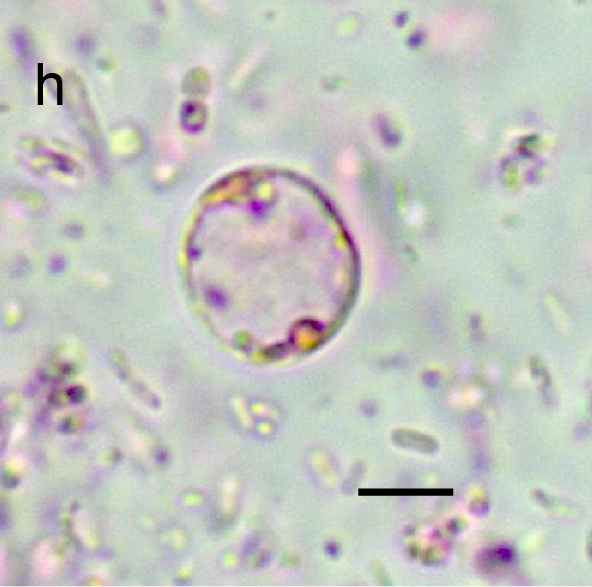
Blastocystis from primate intestines

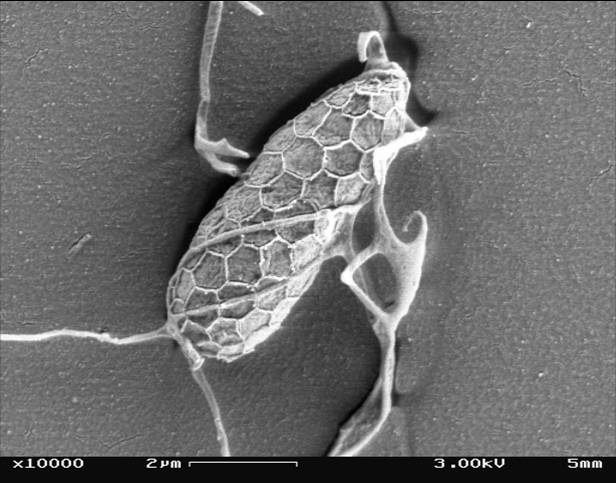
Labyrinthulid with cytoplasmic network

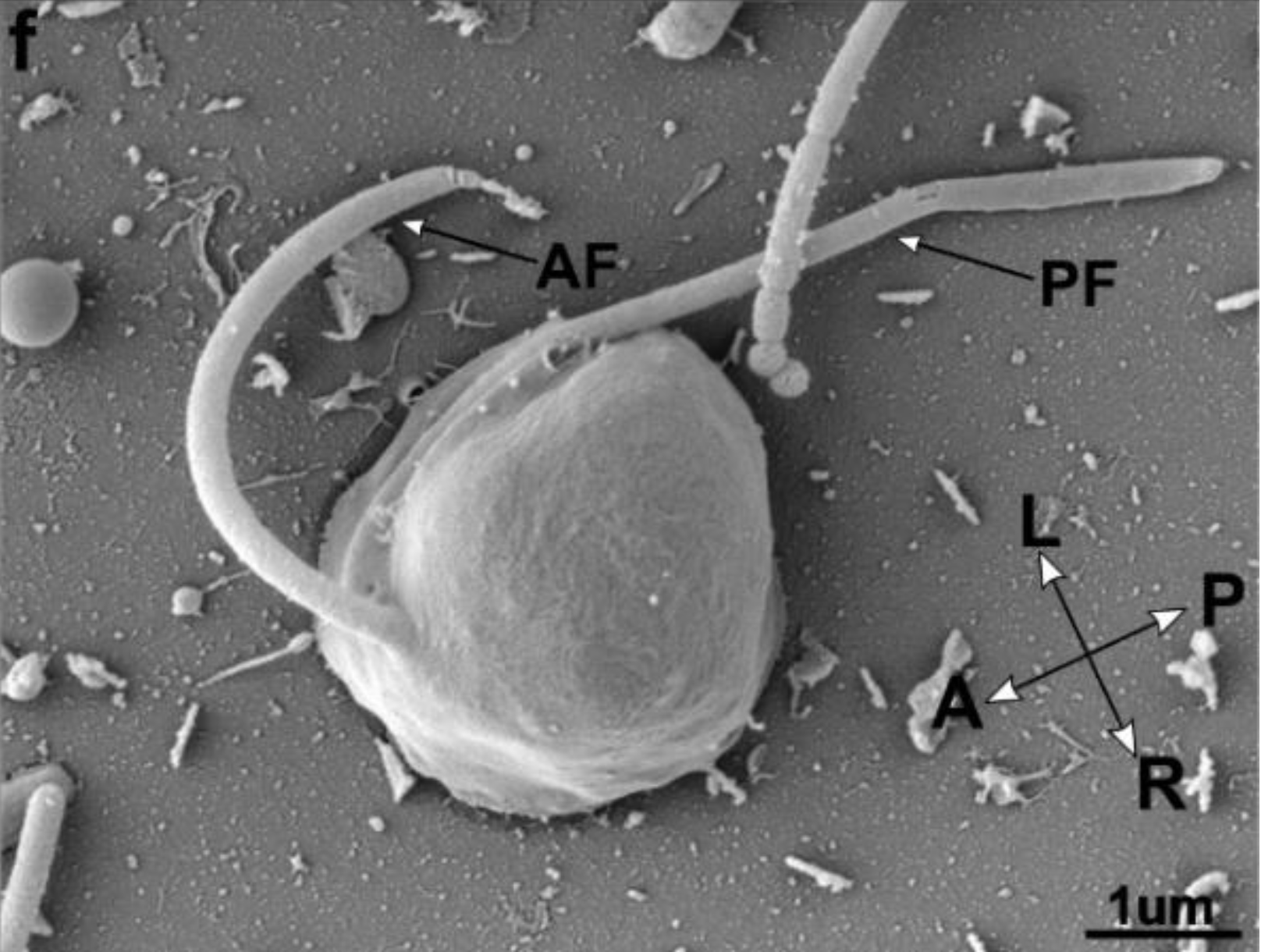
Bicosoecid with two heterokont flagella

== Evolution and systematics ==
=== External ===
Bigyra contains many of the earliest-diverging clades of the Stramenopiles. The Stramenopiles are a supergroup of eukaryotic organisms (protists) characterized by the presence of an anterior flagellum with tripartite hairs, called mastigonemes. Together with Rhizaria and Alveolata, the Stramenopiles compose the SAR supergroup.

All of Bigyra are heterotrophic microorganisms evolved from the last common ancestor of Stramenopiles, which is thought to have been phototrophic. Following this hypothesis, the bigyran ancestor would have secondarily lost their photosynthetic plastids. Some characteristics of bigyran groups can be explained by their origin from ancestral plastids. For example, labyrinthulomycetes can produce omega-3 poly-unsaturated fatty acids through a desaturase usually present in chloroplasts.

=== Internal ===
Bigyra is composed of two subphyla: Opalozoa and Sagenista. Opalozoa is further subdivided into two groups: Placidozoa, which contains the opalines and three clades discovered through the detection of environmental DNA (Nanomonadea, Opalomonadea and Placididea), and the bicosoecid flagellates. Sagenista contains the labyrinthulomycetes and two environmental clades grouped under the name Eogyrea.

The monophyly of Bigyra remains uncertain. The positions of the two bigyran clades (Opalozoa and Sagenista) are not consistent between the published studies, because they diverged from each other very early after the separation from the ancestor of all stramenopiles. This 'deep branching' makes it difficult to find the exact branching order of bigyran clades. Additionally, not all clades are well-represented by molecular data in these studies. Several studies support the monophyly of Bigyra. Other studies support its paraphyly.

Monophyletic Bigyra

- Stramenopiles
  - - Gyrista
      - Ochrophyta
      - plastid loss
        Pseudofungi
    - Bigyra plastid loss
      - Opalozoa
        - Placidozoa
        - Bicosoecida
      - Sagenista
        - Labyrinthulomycetes
        - Eogyrea
  - Platysulcea

Paraphyletic Bigyra

- Stramenopiles
  - - - Gyrista
        - Ochrophyta
        - - Pseudofungi
          - Bigyromonada
      - Sagenista
        - Labyrinthulomycetes
        - Eogyrea
    - - Opalozoa
        - Placidozoa
        - Bicosoecida
  - Platysulcea

== History ==
Initial phylogeny of Bigyra (1997)

- Heterokonta
  - - - - Bigyra
          - Pseudofungi
          - Bigyromonadea
          - Opalinata
        - Limnistia
      - - Sarcinochrysia
        - Dictyochia
      - Fucistia
    - Diatomeae
  - Sagenista

Bigyra was first described in 1997 by the protozoologist Thomas Cavalier-Smith as a phylum within Heterokonta (synonym of Stramenopiles). Bigyra was defined as organisms with the synapomorphy of a ciliary transition region (i.e. a structure that controls protein transport at the base of the flagellum) with structures in the shape of two helices or rings, hence the name 'bigyra' meaning 'double helix'. It contained three subgroups:

1. Pseudofungi, saprotrophic protists with cell walls.
2. Opalinata, non-phagotrophic gut-symbiotes found in animals.
3. Bigyromonada, phagotrophic zooflagellates.

Their common ancestor was thought to have evolved from photosynthetic heterokonts, but would have secondarily lost its plastids, as opposed to the photosynthetic Ochrophyta which retain them. Bigyra was, at the time, postulated as a monophyletic group (or clade), evolved from a paraphyletic grade of ochrophyte classes.

Posterior analyses completely changed the phylogeny of Stramenopiles. They revealed Pseudofungi and Bigyromonadea were more closely related to a monophyletic Ochrophyta than they were to Opalinata, meaning that the synapomorphy of a double helix could have been present in the common ancestor of all heterokonts. This rendered Bigyra paraphyletic. Consequently, Bigyra was revised and modified in 2006 to comprise a different set of three subphyla:

1. Opalozoa, a previously polyphyletic diverse phylum that was modified to only include Opalinata and Nucleohelea;
2. Bicoecea, containing the bicosoecids;
3. Sagenista, containing the osmotrophic Labyrinthulea.

Bigyra was modified again in 2013 after the discovery of several environmental clades called MAST ('MArine STramenopiles'). The subphylum Opalozoa assimilated the bicosoecids and an array of new clades: Placididea, Nanomonadea (MAST-3) and Opalomonadea (MAST-12). The subphylum Sagenista, on the other hand, received a new class Eogyrea that was composed of several MAST lineages not yet described. Later, one of the MAST clades within Eogyrea would be described as Pseudophyllomitus (MAST-6).
