= Bicosoecida =

- Cafeteria roenbergensis, a non-loricate bicosoecid

Scientific classification
- Domain: Eukaryota
- Clade: Sar
- Clade: Stramenopiles
- Phylum: Bigyra
- Subphylum: Opalozoa
- Order: Bicosoecida; Grassé, 1926 emend. Karpov in Karpov, Kersanach and Williams, 1998

Synonyms
- Bikoecida Stein, 1878; Bicoecinae Grassé, 1926; Bicoecidea Grassé & Deflandre in Grassé, 1952; Bicosoecales Bourrelly, 1968, 1981; Bicoecales Kristiansen, 1972; Bicosoecophyceae Casper, 1974, Loeblich III & Loeblich 1979; Bicosoecea Cavalier-Smith, 1986; Bicoecia Cavalier-Smith, 1989; Bicoecea Cavalier-Smith, 1993; Bicocoecida van den Hoek et al., 1995; Bicosoecida Honigberg et al., 1964, Zhukov, 1978, Karpov, 1998, 2000

Order of protists

Bicosoecida (ICZN) or Bicosoecales/Bicoecea (ICBN) is an order, a small group of unicellular flagellates, included among the stramenopiles. Informally known as bicosoecids, they are free-living cells, with no chloroplasts, and in some genera are encased in a lorica.

The name of the type genus Bicosoeca described by James-Clark in 1866 is derived from Greek roots (bikos, vase, bowl, plus oekein, inhabit). The philologically preferable compound would be Bicoeca, as "corrected" by Stein in 1878 and followed by most subsequent authors. However, according to the ICBN and ICZN, the original spelling of the name cannot be considered incorrect and it must be used in its original form.

The group was formerly considered to be related to the Chrysophyceae.

Some authors use the vernacular term "bicosoecid" (or "bicoecid") in a narrower sense, only for Bicosoeca, applying "bicoeceans" to Bicosoeca and related groups like Cafeteria.

== Morphology ==
Representation of a bicosoecid: 1. Anterior flagellum; 2. Mastigoneme; 3. "Lip"; 4. Flagellar root subtending lip; 5. Bacterial prey; 6. Golgi apparatus, packages proteins; 7. Phagocytic vesicle; 8. Nucleus; 9. Nucleolus; 10. Endoplasmic reticulum, the transport network for molecules going to specific parts of the cell; 11. Mitochondrion; creates ATP (energy) for the cell; 12. Contractile vacuole, regulates the quantity of water inside a cell; 13. Digestive Vacuole; 14. Recurrent flagellum; 15. Lorica

== Bibliography ==
- Hibberd, D. J. (1986). Ultrastructure of the Chrysophyceae. Colorless forms. p. 29-30 In: Chrysophytes: Aspects and Problems. Kristiansen, J. and R.A. Andersen [Eds.]. Cambridge University Press, Cambridge.
