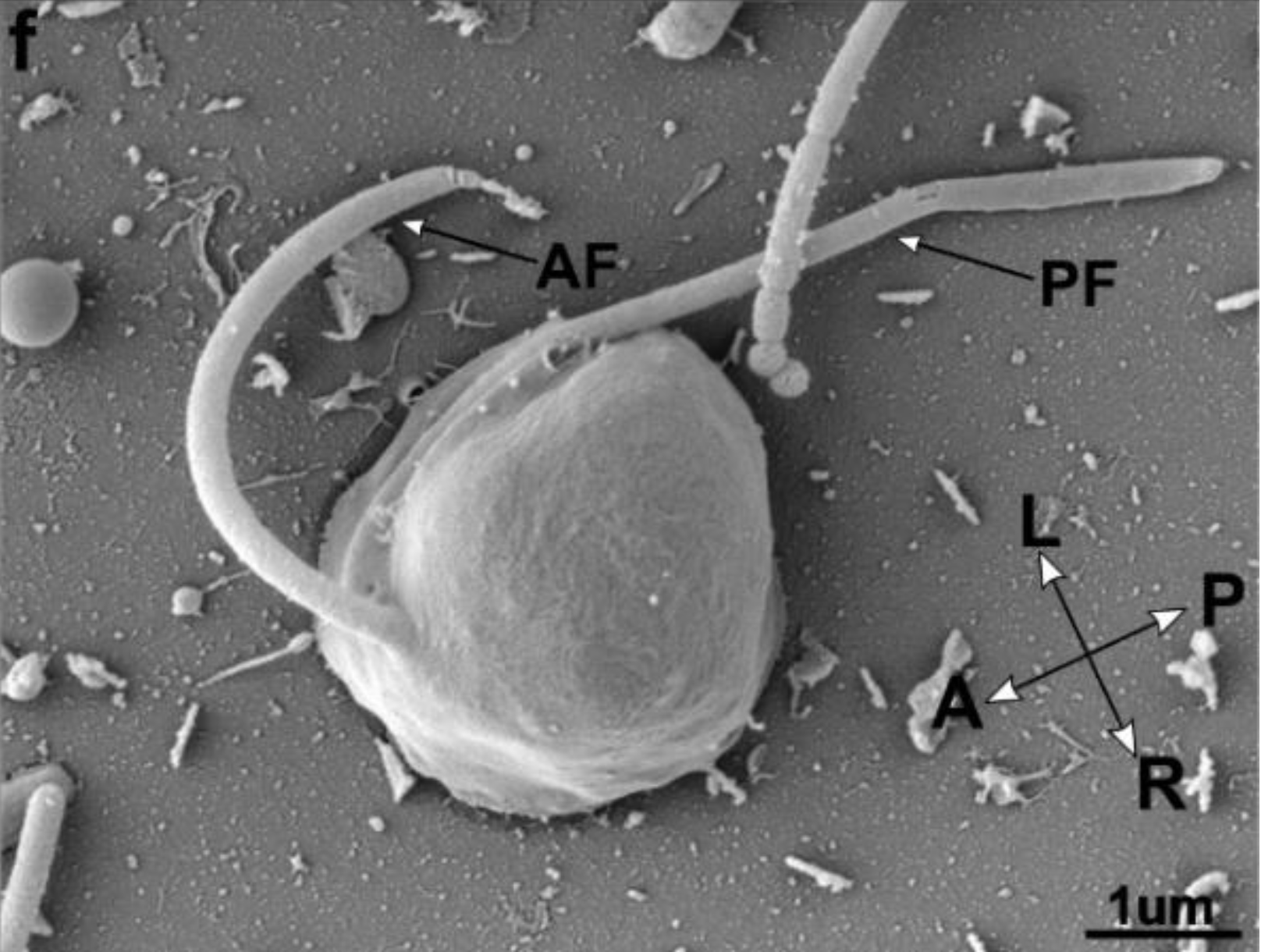
- Cafileria marina SEM image. AF: anterior flagellum; PF: posterior flagellum; L: left; R: right; A: anterior; P: posterior.

Scientific classification
- Domain: Eukaryota
- Clade: Sar
- Clade: Stramenopiles
- Phylum: Bigyra
- Order: Bicosoecida
- Clade?: Cyathobodoniae
- Genus: Cafileria; Jirsová et al. 2019
- Species: C. marina

Binomial name
- Cafileria marina Jirsová et al. 2019

= Cafileria =

Genus of marine protists

Cafileria is a genus of marine microscopic protists. It is monotypic, comprising the single species Cafileria marina, described in 2019 from Norway. It is part of a clade of heterotrophic flagellates that consume bacteria, known as Bicosoecida. Due to its small size it is described as a nanoflagellate. It is the only organism where direct connections between mitochondria and the cell nucleus have been observed. Another peculiarity of C. marina is the change in shape of the Golgi apparatus during the cell cycle.

== Discovery ==
Cells of Cafileria marina were sampled from part of an algal mat community in a rock surface from Kvernesfjord, Norway. Their morphology, ultrastructure, flagellar apparatus and mitochondrial genome were investigated. The results, along with the formal taxonomic description of Cafileria marina, were published in 2019 by Czech researchers Dagmar Jirsová, Zoltán Füssy, Jitka Richtová, Ansgar Gruber and Miroslav Oborník.

The hapantotype of C. marina was deposited under the name IP CAS Pro 59 in the slide collection at the Biological Centre of the Czech Academy of Sciences in České Budějovice, Czech Republic.

== Etymology ==
Cafileria is named after kafilerie, the Czech name for a rendering plant where the biomass of animal origin is transformed for the production of lipids, glue and fertilizers. In a parallel manner, Cafileria feasts on bacteria and recycles organic materials that are part of their biofilm habitat. The species epithet marina is due to the marine origin of the species.

== Cell structure ==
=== External appearance ===
Cells of C. marina are rounded on the right side and flattened on the left side, resembling the shape of a "D". The cell body is 3–4 μm wide and 5–6 μm long, making it a nanoflagellate by size. The cellular surface is smooth, without any features (no lorica, cell wall, etc.) visible by light or scanning electron microscopy. Like other bicosoecids, they have two smooth flagella (anterior and posterior), with an equal length of around 1.5–2 times the length of the cell body. The flagella are in a sub-apical position and emerge from a dent on the ventral side.

=== Organelles ===
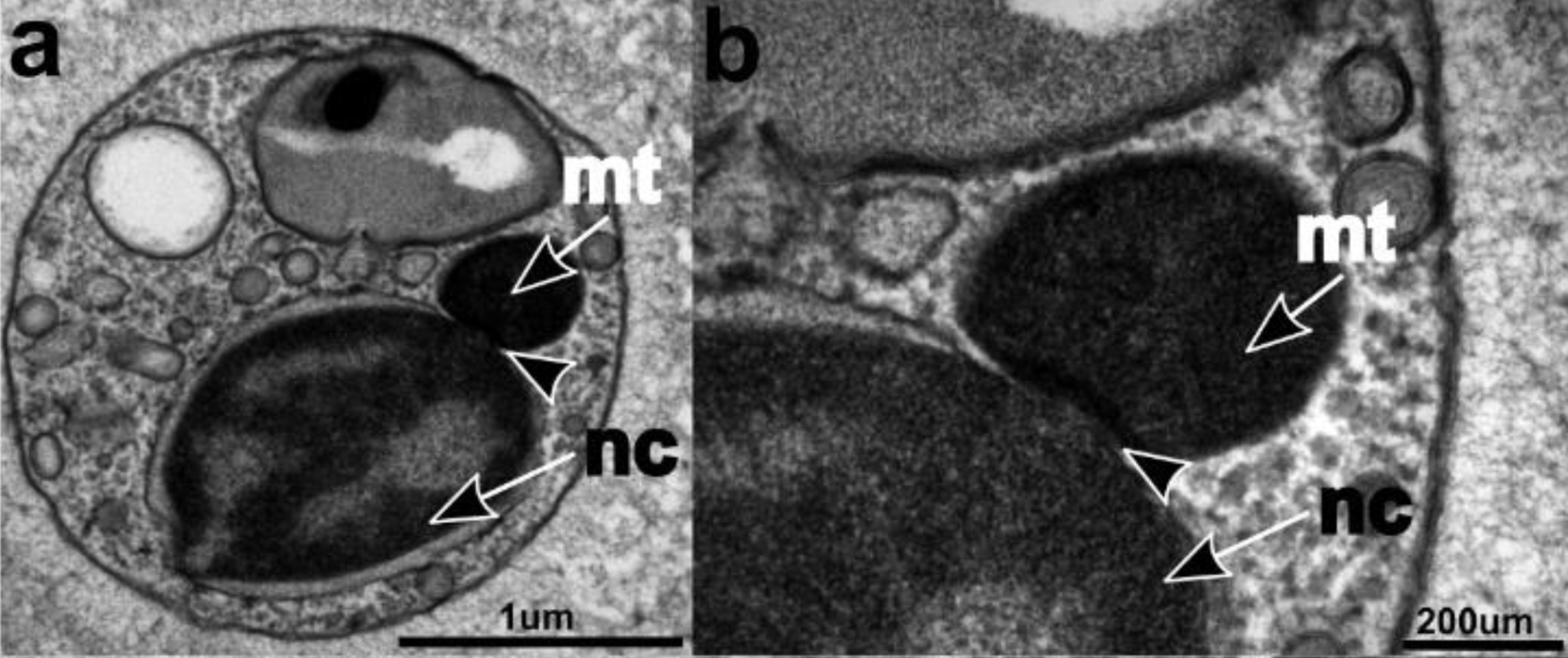
Connections between the nucleus (nc) and the mitochondria (mt) seen in Cafileria marina through TEM

C. marina cells localize their nucleus and mitochondria with tubular cristae (as is common in Stramenopiles) in the anterior part of the cell. A peculiar phenomenon in C. marina is that, in young cultures (≤ 2 weeks old), the nucleus and mitochondria are tightly connected through junctions. Although clustering of mitochondria near the nucleus is seen in mammalian tissues, this is the first time that a full connection between these compartments has been described. Various functions for this peculiar connection have been hypothesized:

(i) enabling the exchange of ATP/ADP between the two organelles, thereby providing the high energy needed by the nucleus,
(ii) facilitating the transport of necessary nuclear tRNA that the mitochondria cannot produce,
(iii) transporting mRNA to be translated in the mitochondria,
(iv) equally segregating mitochondria to the daughter cells after mitosis,
(v) or simply a more efficient use of the limited space in a small cell size.

The Golgi apparatus is in the anterior part of the cell, with its 4–5 cisternae aligned parallel to the nuclear envelope. During the cell cycle, the shape of the Golgi cisternae changes from flat-stacked to rounded: the flat cisternae curve inside and create hollowed rounded shapes. A similar phenomenon happens in mammalian cells, in association with changes in sphingomyelin metabolism, but in the case of Cafileria the mechanism responsible is unknown.

Several small vesicles are scattered across the cytosol, while food vacuoles are considerably larger and are localized in the posterior part of the cell, occupying almost one third of its volume. Some of the food vacuoles can contain intact or partially digested bacteria.

=== Flagellar apparatus ===
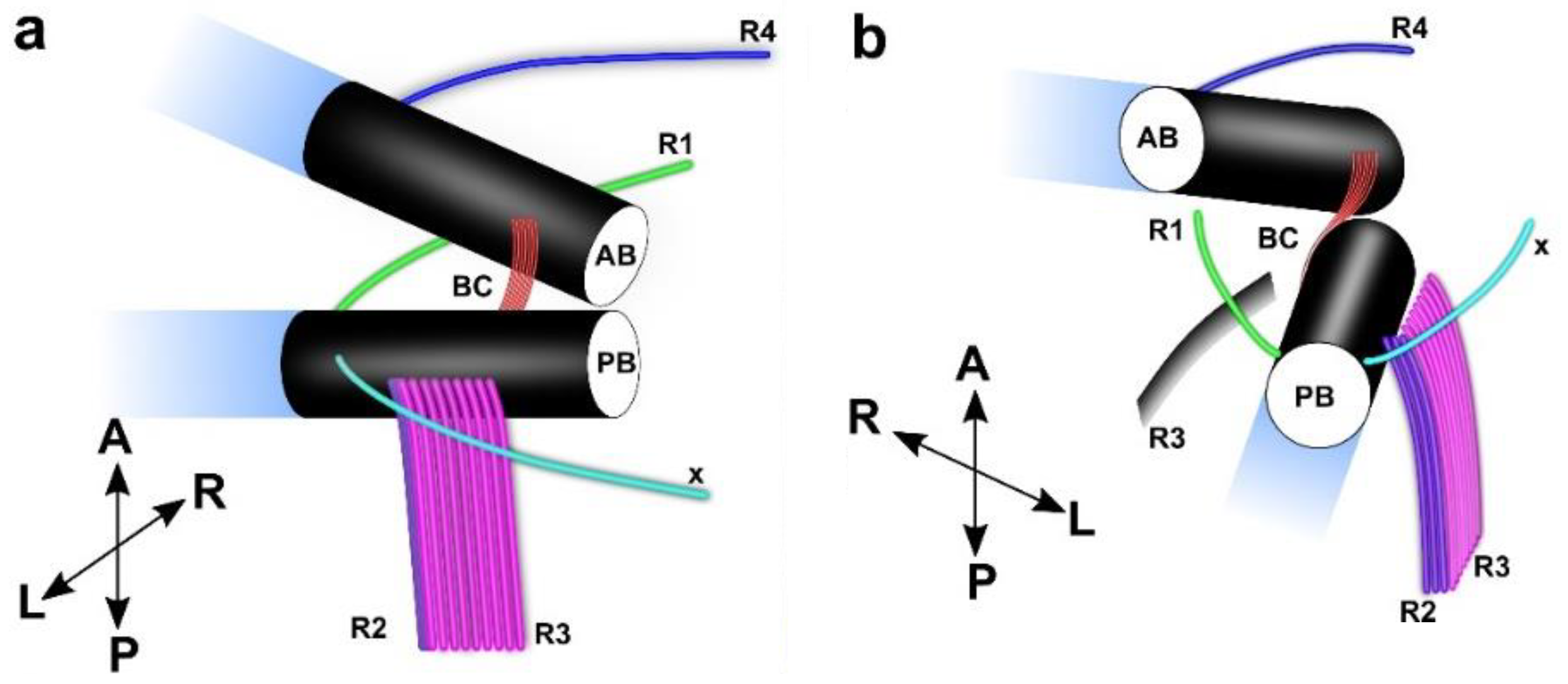
3D reconstruction of the flagellar apparatus of Cafileria marina. AB: anterior basal body; BC: connection between basal bodies; PB: posterior basal body; R1–4: microtubular roots; x: additional microtubular structure; A: anterior; P: posterior; L: left; R: right.

C. marina has its two flagella attached to four roots made of microtubules. There are two basal bodies, in the anterior (front) part of the cell, at a 45° angle to each other, connected to each other through a striated fiber. The flagella each have an axoneme structure with two central microtubules and a circle of nine microtubules around them. The four roots (named R1, R2, R3 and R4) have 8, 3, 1, and 1 microtubules respectively, an arrangement unique to C. marina.

== Ecology and cell behavior ==
Cafileria marina lives in close association with an unidentified species of pelagophyte alga. It glides through the mucilage secreted by the pelagophyte. While moving, it exhibits a tumbling motion, with the anterior flagellum freely sweeping while the posterior one is used as an anchor, attached to the surface. It is constantly feeding through phagotrophy, with a permanent cytostome; no resting stages or spores have been observed.

== Genetic characteristics ==
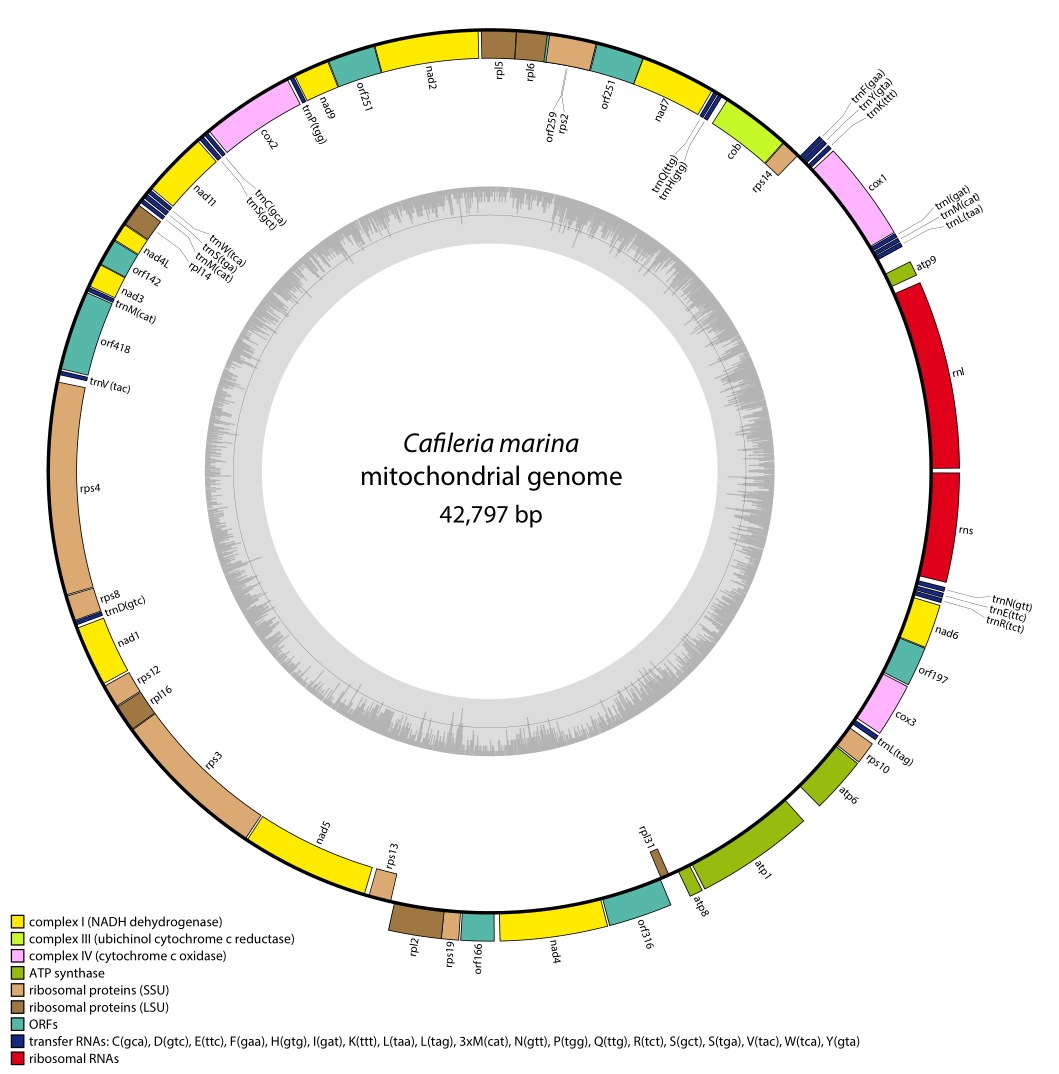
Mitochondrial genome of C. marina

The mitochondrial genome of C. marina is 42,797 base pairs long, with a content of 21.3% CG (cytosine-guanine pairs), much lower than other heterotrophic stramenopile mitochondrial genomes.

The genetic code of the mitochondrial genome is an unusual type 4 code, found across different prokaryotic and eukaryotic groups, in which the UGA codon codes for the aminoacid tryptophan and the UAA/UAG codons are the stop codons. The mitochondrial genome is also unusual in lacking any group I or group II introns, which are typical of other mitochondria.

The mitochondrial genome contains genes for all tRNAs except for threonine, alanine and glycine—which are carried by nuclear tRNAs instead—, large and small subunit ribosomal RNA genes arranged in tandem, and protein-coding genes for subunits of several complexes: respiratory complexes (I, III and IV), ATP synthase, and the protein portion of the large and small subunits of ribosomes. Despite having a very similar gene content compared to other heterotrophic stramenopiles, the order of genes is highly rearranged in C. marina. For example, it is the only stramenopile species known to encode the nad11 gene (a subunit of NADH-ubiquinone oxidoreductase) with 4Fe–4S domains within the N-terminal ferredoxin-type module, instead of the C-terminal molybdopterin-type module, although the consequences of this change are unclear.

== Evolutionary relationships ==
Cafileria belongs to the Bicosoecida lineage of the stramenopiles, but its position within this group is still unclear. According to the study that described Cafileria marina in 2019, phylogenetic and morphological analyses group the family Cafeteriidae as the closest relative of Cafileria marina, with Caecitellus as the sister taxon of C. marina, though the authors explain "further investigation is [...] needed to confirm this claim". A posterior analysis from 2022 recovered Cafileria outside the Anoecales; as the authors put it, "The phylogenetic resolution of the bicosoecids is still an ongoing issue".

Phylogeny in 2019

- Bicosoecida
  - - - - - Caecitellus
          - Cafileria
        - - Cafeteria
          - Halocafeteria
        - - Symbiomonas
          - Anoeca
      - - - - Siluania
            - Adriamonas
          - Paramonas
        - Bicosoecida sp.
    - Bicosoeca
  - Pseudobodo

Phylogeny in 2022

- Bicosoecida
  - - Anoecales
      - - Cafeteria
        - - Caecitellus
          - - Anoeca
            - Symbiomonas
      - Halocafeteria
    - Cafileria
  - Bilabrum
