= Ascobolus brantophilus =

Scientific classification
- Domain: Eukaryota
- Kingdom: Fungi
- Division: Ascomycota
- Class: Pezizomycetes
- Order: Pezizales
- Family: Ascobolaceae
- Genus: Ascobolus
- Species: A. brantophilus

Binomial name
- Ascobolus brantophilus Dissing, 1989

Species of fungus

Ascobolus brantophilus is a species of coprophilous fungus in the family Ascobolaceae. It grows on goose droppings.

Ascobolus brantophilus mainly has an Arctic and Subarctic distribution. It described in 1989 from Greenland, Ellesmere Island and Svalbard and has since then been reported from Iceland, the Shetland Islands and the Falkland Islands
