= Taisui =

Taisui could refer to:

- Taisui (biological object), a soil biological object or microbial mat known from China
- Tai Sui, Chinese name for stars directly opposite the planet Jupiter (Chinese: 木星; pinyin: Mùxīng)
