= A. brassicae =

A. brassicae may refer to:

- Acholeplasma brassicae, a wall-less bacteria
- Aleyrodes brassicae, a whitefly with global distribution
- Alternaria brassicae, a plant pathogen
- Anthomyia brassicae, a pest of crops
- Aphis brassicae, a destructive aphid
- Ascobolus brassicae, an apothecial fungus
- Asteromella brassicae, a plant pathogen
