= Mold, protozoan, and coelenterate mitochondrial code and the mycoplasma/spiroplasma code =

Genetic code in mitochondria of various organisms and in mycoplasma/spiroplasma

The mold, protozoan, and coelenterate mitochondrial code and the mycoplasma/spiroplasma code (translation table 4) is the genetic code used by various organisms, in some cases with slight variations, notably the use of UGA as a tryptophan codon rather than a stop codon.

== The code ==
AAs = FFLLSSSSYY**CCWWLLLLPPPPHHQQRRRRIIIMTTTTNNKKSSRRVVVVAAAADDEEGGGG
Starts = --MM---------------M------------MMMM---------------M------------
Base1 = TTTTTTTTTTTTTTTTCCCCCCCCCCCCCCCCAAAAAAAAAAAAAAAAGGGGGGGGGGGGGGGG
Base2 = TTTTCCCCAAAAGGGGTTTTCCCCAAAAGGGGTTTTCCCCAAAAGGGGTTTTCCCCAAAAGGGG
Base3 = TCAGTCAGTCAGTCAGTCAGTCAGTCAGTCAGTCAGTCAGTCAGTCAGTCAGTCAGTCAGTCAG

Bases: adenine (A), cytosine (C), guanine (G) and thymine (T) or uracil (U).

Amino acids: Alanine (Ala, A), Arginine (Arg, R), Asparagine (Asn, N), Aspartic acid (Asp, D), Cysteine (Cys, C), Glutamic acid (Glu, E), Glutamine (Gln, Q), Glycine (Gly, G), Histidine (His, H), Isoleucine (Ile, I), Leucine (Leu, L), Lysine (Lys, K), Methionine (Met, M), Phenylalanine (Phe, F), Proline (Pro, P), Serine (Ser, S), Threonine (Thr, T), Tryptophan (Trp, W), Tyrosine (Tyr, Y), Valine (Val, V).

== Differences from the standard code ==
DNA codons	RNA codons	This code (4)	Standard code (1)
TGA	UGA	Trp (W)	STOP = Ter (*)

=== Alternative initiation codons ===
- Trypanosoma: UUA, UUG, CUG ;
- Leishmania: AUU, AUA ;
- Tetrahymena: AUU, AUA, AUG ;
- Paramecium: AUU, AUA, AUG, AUC, GUG, GUA(?).

(Pritchard et al., 1990)

== Systematic range ==
- Bacteria: The code is used in Entomoplasmatales and Mycoplasmatales (Bove et al. 1989). The situation in the Acholeplasmatales is unclear. Based on a study of ribosomal protein genes, it had been concluded that UGA does not code for tryptophan in plant-pathogenic mycoplasma-like organisms (MLO) and the Acholeplasmataceae (Lim and Sears, 1992) and there seems to be only a single tRNA-CCA for tryptophan in Acholeplasma laidlawii (Tanaka et al. 1989). In contrast, in a study of codon usage in Phytoplasmas, it was found that 30 out of 78 open reading frames analysed translated better with this code (UGA for tryptophan) than with the bacterial, archaeal and plant plastid code while the remainder showed no differences between the two codes (Melamed et al. 2003). In addition, the coding reassignment of UGA Stop → Trp can be found in an alpha-proteobacterial symbiont of cicadas: Candidatus Hodgkinia cicadicola (McCutcheon et al. 2009). Mycoplasma pneumoniae also uses the codon UGA to code for tryptophan rather than using it as a stop codon.
- Fungi: Emericella nidulans, Neurospora crassa, Podospora anserina, Acremonium (Fox, 1987), Candida parapsilosis (Guelin et al., 1991), Trichophyton rubrum (de Bievre and Dujon, 1992), Dekkera/Brettanomyces, Eeniella (Hoeben et al., 1993), and probably Ascobolus immersus, Aspergillus amstelodami, Claviceps purpureaand Cochliobolus heterostrophus.
- Protists: the red algae of Gigartinales (Boyen et al. 1994), the protozoa Trypanosoma brucei, Leishmania tarentolae, Paramecium tetraurelia, Tetrahymena pyriformis and probably Plasmodium gallinaceum (Aldritt et al., 1989), and the stramenopile Cafileria marina.
- Metazoa: Coelenterata (Ctenophora and Cnidaria).
- Other: this code is also used for the kinetoplast DNA (maxicircles, minicircles). Kinetoplasts are modified mitochondria (or their parts).

== See also ==
- List of genetic codes
