= Saccobolus glaber =

Scientific classification
- Kingdom: Fungi
- Division: Ascomycota
- Class: Pezizomycetes
- Order: Pezizales
- Family: Ascobolaceae
- Genus: Saccobolus
- Species: S. glaber

Binomial name
- Saccobolus glaber Pers., 1794

Species of fungus

Saccobolus glaber is a species of apothecial fungus belonging to the family Ascobolaceae.

This is an uncommon European species which appears in summer and autumn as minute yellowish discs only reaching 0.5 mm across, thickly clustered on animal dung.
