= Sippewissett microbial mat =

Coordinates: 41.588099°N 70.640961°W

The Sippewissett microbial mat is a microbial mat in the Sippewissett Salt Marsh located along the lower eastern Buzzards Bay shoreline of Cape Cod, about 5 miles north of Woods Hole and 1 mile southwest of West Falmouth, Massachusetts, in the United States. The marsh has two regions, the Great Sippewisset Marsh to the north and Little Sippewisset Marsh to the south, separated from each other by a narrow tongue of land (Saconesset Hills). The marsh extends into an estuary in which the intertidal zone provides a dynamic environment that supports a diverse ecology, including threatened and endangered species such as the roseate tern (Sterna dougallii). The ecology of the salt marsh is based in and supported by the microbial mats which cover the ground of the marsh.

== Description ==
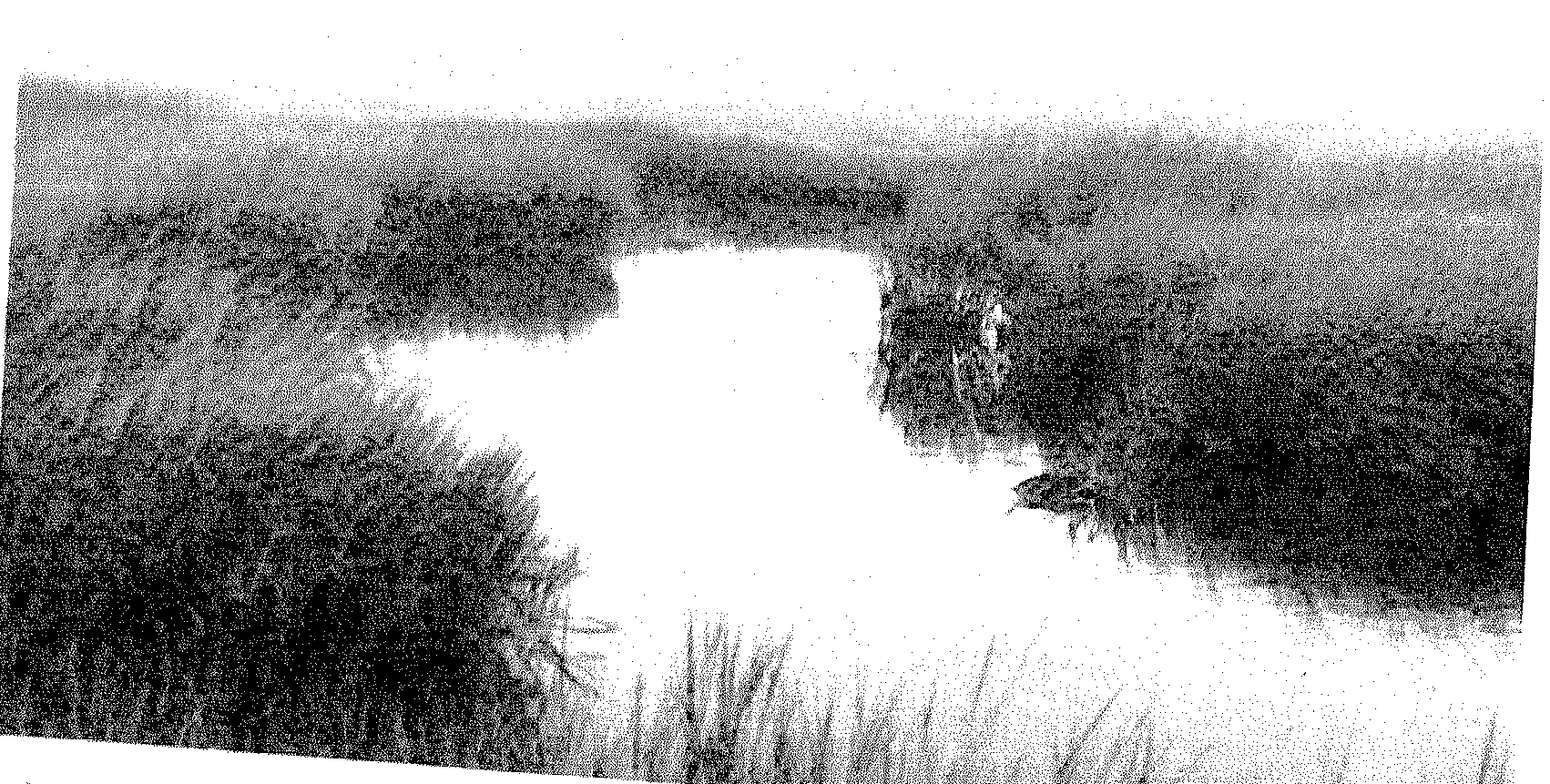
The Great Sippewissett Salt Marsh

The Sippewissett Salt Marsh houses a diverse, laminated intertidal microbial mat around 1 cm thick. The mat is characterized by regular influx of sea water, high amounts of sulfide and iron, and the production of methane. The mat contains four or five distinctly colored layers. The color of each layer can be attributed to the microbial community composition and the biogeochemical processes they perform at each of the layers. The mats are often coated by green macro- and microalgae that adhere to the surface. The top, green-brown layer is composed of cyanobacteria and diatom species. A blue-green intermediate layer is formed by Oscillatoria species. Purple sulfur bacteria are found in the pink central layer. Below the pink layer, an orange-black layer is formed predominately by a single species of purple sulfur bacteria, Thiocapsa pfennigii, and spirochetes. The thin, bottom layer is made up of green sulfur bacteria belonging to the genus Prosthecochloris, though this layer is not always present. Below the mat is iron sulfide-rich sediments and remnants of decaying mats.

== Structure ==
=== Green layer ===
The top 1 mm of the green layer is often gold due to the dominant cyanobacteria and diatom species. Specific cyanobacteria identified are Lyngbya, a sheeted cyanobacterium, and Nostoc and Phormidium, which are filamentous cyanobacteria, and Spirulina spp. Diatom species identified include Navicula. Below this top gold layer extends 5 mm and is dominated by Lyngbya and Oscillatoria species The green layer is also composed of green sulfur bacteria which oxidize sulfur during their growth and are strict photolithotrophs.

=== Pink layer ===
The pink layer extends 3 mm below the green layer. The color is due to the presence of carotinoids which are the primary pigments of the phototrophic purple sulfur bacteria. Amoebobacter, Thiocapsa, Chromatium, and Thiocystis are among the species of purple sulfur bacteria identified. Purple sulfur bacteria can use a number of different electron donors for their anaerobic phototrophic growth, including: hydrogen sulfide, sulfur, thiosulfate, and molecular hydrogen. Their diverse use of many electron donors makes this layer stand out in the microbial mat community.

=== Black layer ===
The bottom layer makes up the lower 2 mm of the mat before the depth drops below the chemocline. The black color is due to the high amounts of iron sulfide generated by the green sulfur-reducing bacteria. The layer consists mostly of green sulfur bacteria belonging to the Prosthecochloris, which are a small group of prosthecate bacteria containing many knobby projections. Organisms in this layer decompose organic matter formed by the upper layers, thus recycling the matter.

=== Gray layer ===
The thin, bottommost layer lies below the chemocline and contains fewer organisms than the slightly thicker black layer. The gray color is due to the presence of pyrite. Here, the empty shells of diatoms can be found. Microbial species here are dominated by methylotrophic methanogens which generate the methane observed in the salt marsh. This layer is not active year-round; the organisms are largely dormant in the winter.

== Metabolism ==
The metabolism of the organisms throughout each layer of the microbial mats are tightly coupled to each other and play important roles in providing nutrients for the plants and animals that live in the marsh. The cyanobacteria and diatom algae present in the mat are aerobic photoautotrophs whose energy is derived from the light with oxygen as the electron acceptor and use hydrogen gas and iron as electron donors.

Purple sulfur bacteria are anaerobic or microaerophilic photoautotrophs, and use hydrogen sulfide, sulfur, thiosulfate, and molecular hydrogen as electron donors.

Spirochaetes in the orange-black layer are chemoheterotrophic and use iron as an electron donor.

== Research ==
The Sippewissett Salt Marsh has served as a hallmark for studies done on estuarine environments. Scientists at the Woods Hole Oceanographic Institution, the Boston University Marine Program, and the Marine Biological Laboratory have been studying Great Sippewissett Salt Marsh extensively since 1970 to gain a better understanding of microbial diversity and the effects they have on geochemical cycling and nutrient cycling for other organisms. The Sippewissett salt marsh is of particular importance for research, as it is one of the few generally undisturbed salt marshes in New England.
