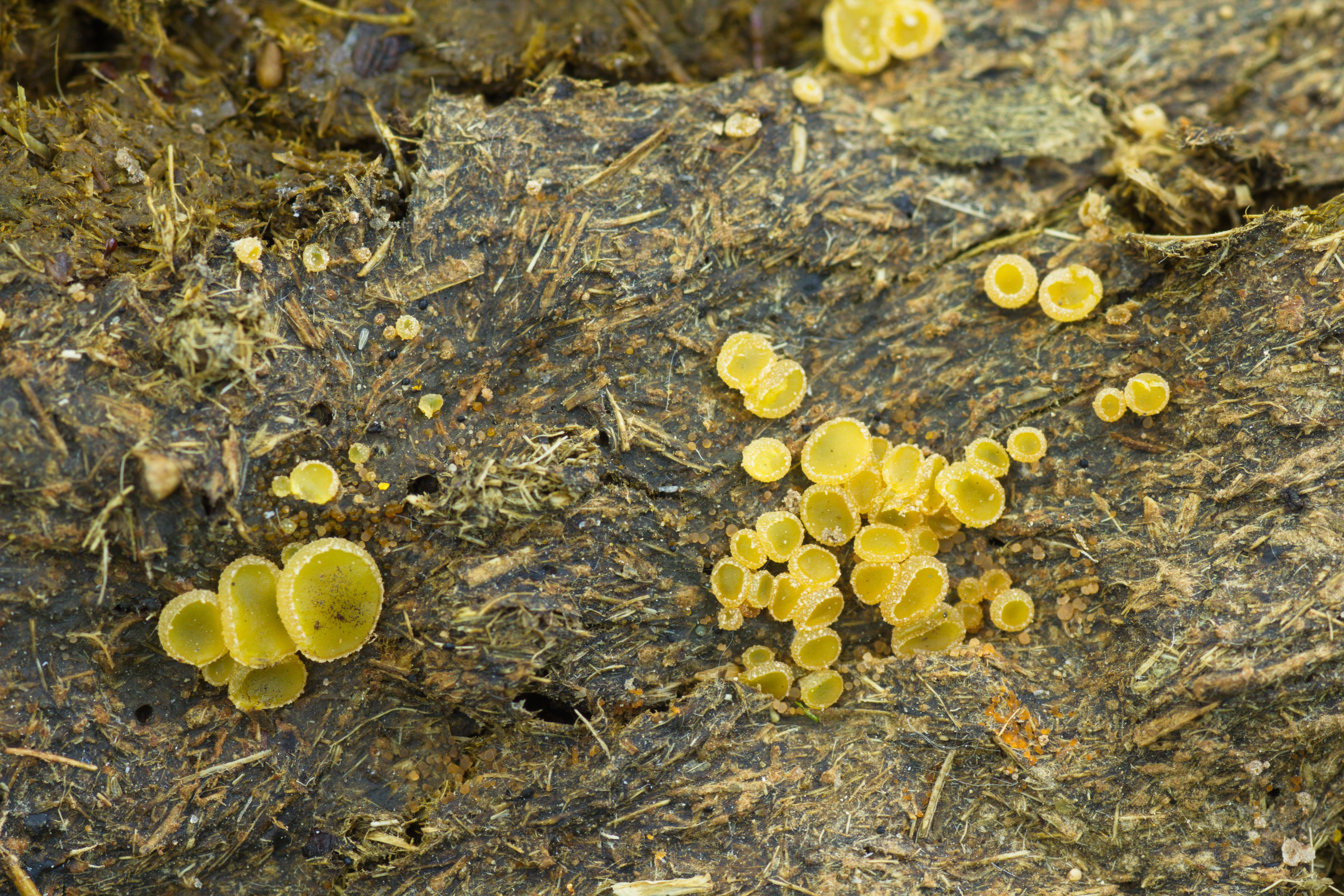
- Ascobolus sp. growing on cow dung

Scientific classification
- Domain: Eukaryota
- Kingdom: Fungi
- Division: Ascomycota
- Class: Pezizomycetes
- Order: Pezizales
- Family: Ascobolaceae
- Genus: Ascobolus; Pers. (1796)

Type species
- Ascobolus pezizoides Pers. (1797)

Synonyms
- Phaeopezia subgen. Crouaniella Sacc. (1884); Ascobolus subgen. Dasyobolus Sacc. (1889); Dasybolus Clem. & Shear (1931); Anserina Velen. (1934); Seliniella Arx & E.Müll. (1955)

= Ascobolus =

Genus of fungi

Ascobolus is a genus of fungi in the Ascobolaceae family. The genus has a widespread distribution, and contains an estimated 61 species, most of which are coprophilous. The genus was circumscribed by Christian Hendrik Persoon in 1796.

== Species ==
Species include:

- Ascobolus albidus
- Ascobolus americanus
- Ascobolus asininus
- Ascobolus barbatus
- Ascobolus behnitziensis
- Ascobolus bistisii
- Ascobolus brantophilus
- Ascobolus brassicae
- Ascobolus brunneus
- Ascobolus calesco
- Ascobolus carbonarius
- Ascobolus carletonii
- Ascobolus cervinus
- Ascobolus ciliatus
- Ascobolus crenulatus
- Ascobolus crosslandii
- Ascobolus dadei
- Ascobolus degluptus
- Ascobolus denudatus
- Ascobolus egyptiacus
- Ascobolus elegans
- Ascobolus epimyces
- Ascobolus equinus
- Ascobolus foliicola
- Ascobolus geophilus
- Ascobolus hansenii
- Ascobolus hawaiiensis
- Ascobolus immersus
- Ascobolus leveillei
- Ascobolus lignatilis
- Ascobolus lineolatus
- Ascobolus macrosporus
- Ascobolus mancus
- Ascobolus masseei
- Ascobolus michaudii
- Ascobolus minutus
- Ascobolus perplexans
- Ascobolus pezizoides
- Ascobolus purpurascens
- Ascobolus rhytidosporus
- Ascobolus roseopurpurascens
- Ascobolus sacchariferus
- Ascobolus stercorarius
- Ascobolus stictoideus
- Ascobolus viridis
- Ascobolus winteri
