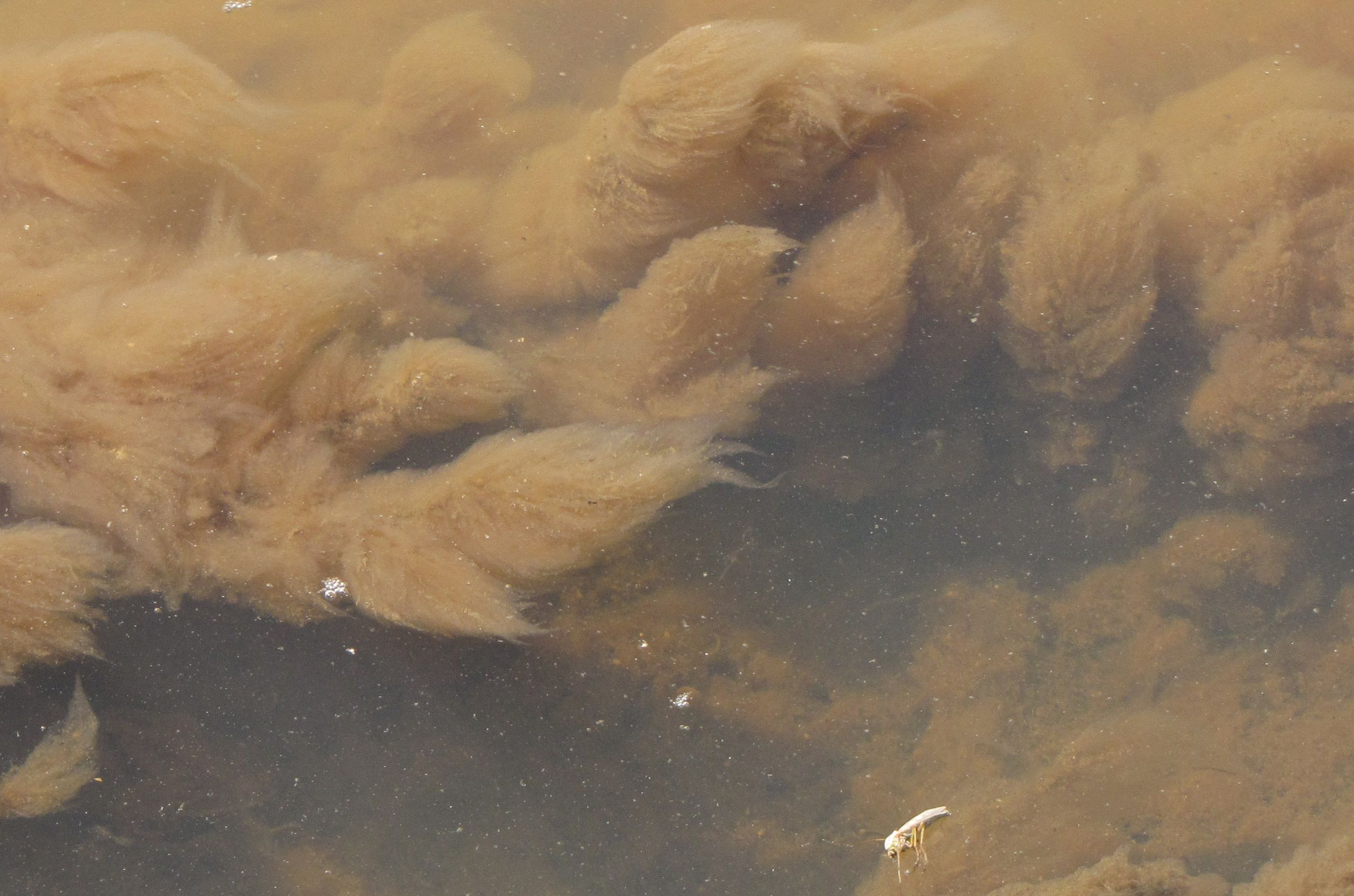
- Submerged S. natans colonies with floating insect in the lower right for scale. Beige color shown is typical of aerated sewage treatment plants, but color may vary through grey toward black downstream of septic sewage or into brighter orange from precipitated red iron oxide.

Scientific classification
- Domain: Bacteria
- Kingdom: Pseudomonadati
- Phylum: Pseudomonadota
- Class: Betaproteobacteria
- Order: Burkholderiales
- Family: Sphaerotilaceae
- Genus: Sphaerotilus
- Species: S. natans

Binomial name
- Sphaerotilus natans Kützing 1833

= Sphaerotilus natans =

Species of bacterium

Sphaerotilus natans is an aquatic periphyton bacterial organism associated with polluted water. These tightly sheathed filamentous bacteria colonies are commonly but inaccurately known as "sewage fungus"

== Morphology ==
Straight or smoothly curved filaments 1.5 μm in diameter and 100 to more than 500 μm in length are formed by rod-shaped cells with clear septa growing within a long, tubular sheath. An adhesive basal element at one end of the filament can aid attachment to solid surfaces. The sheath offers some protection from predators, and the ability to anchor in flowing water allows access to a passing stream of food and nutrients. Individual mature cells swarm out of the protective tube to colonize new sites. Each motile mature cell has an intertwined bundle of flagella appearing as a single flagellum consisting of a long filament with a short hook and a basal body complex, but it is distinguishable by electron microscope as 10 to 30 strands with diameters of 12.5 to 16 nm each. S. natans stores reserves of poly- beta -hydroxybutyrate as internal bioplastic globules making up 30 to 40% of the dry weight of a colony. Gram and Neisser staining reactions are negative.

== Habitat ==
Sphaerotilus natans requires dissolved simple sugars or organic acids as a food supply, but needs less phosphorus than many competing organisms and can tolerate low oxygen concentrations. Capability to deposit elemental sulfur intracellularly in the presence of hydrogen sulfide is believed to be a detoxifying mechanism. S. natans requires either cobalamin or methionine as a trace nutrient. S. natans filaments can aid development of a periphyton biofilm trapping suspended particles and stabilizing colonies of other organisms including Klebsiella and Pseudomonas.

Sphaerotilus natans is described as a key taxon in sewage fungus, a polymicrobial biofilm that proliferates in rivers with a high organic loading such as from sewage discharges, industrial effluents or runoff from airport de-icing. It is also implicated in active sludge bulking

== Significance ==
Sphaerotilus natans is often associated with a buoyant floc (or "bulking sludge") causing poor solids separation in activated sludge clarifiers of secondary sewage treatment. Metal surfaces covered with S. natans may experience accelerated corrosion if the slime creates a barrier causing differential oxygen concentrations. S. natans slimes may reduce quality of paper produced by paper mills that use recycled water.
