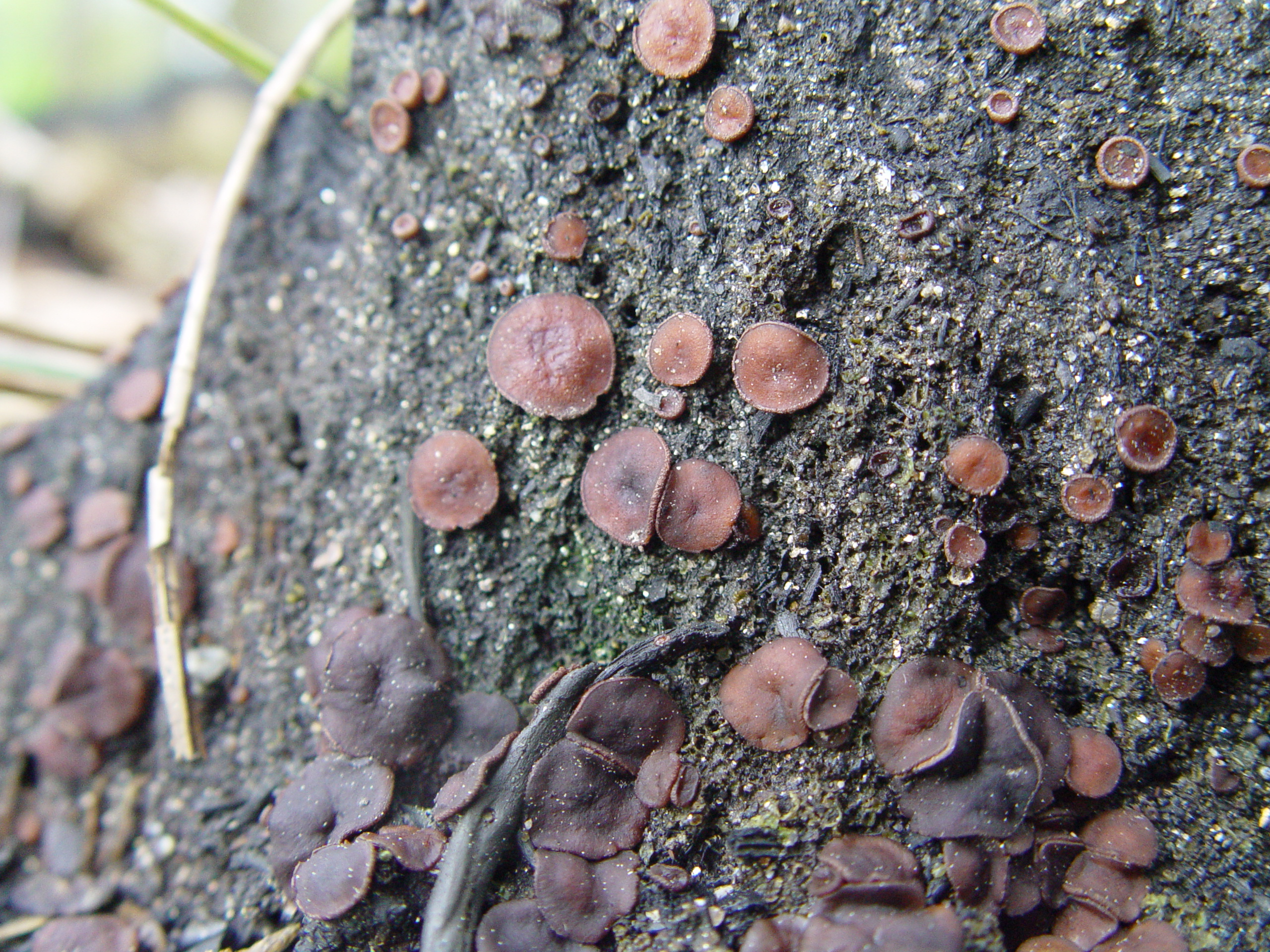

Scientific classification
- Kingdom: Fungi
- Division: Ascomycota
- Class: Pezizomycetes
- Order: Pezizales
- Family: Ascobolaceae
- Genus: Ascobolus
- Species: A. carbonarius

Binomial name
- Ascobolus carbonarius P.Karst, 1871

Synonyms
- Ascobolus atrofuscus W. Phillips & Plowr., 1874

= Ascobolus carbonarius =

Species of fungus

Ascobolus carbonarius is a species of apothecial fungus belonging to the family Ascobolaceae.

This is a European species appearing in spring and summer as olive-brown coloured discs up to 5 mm across on burned ground.
