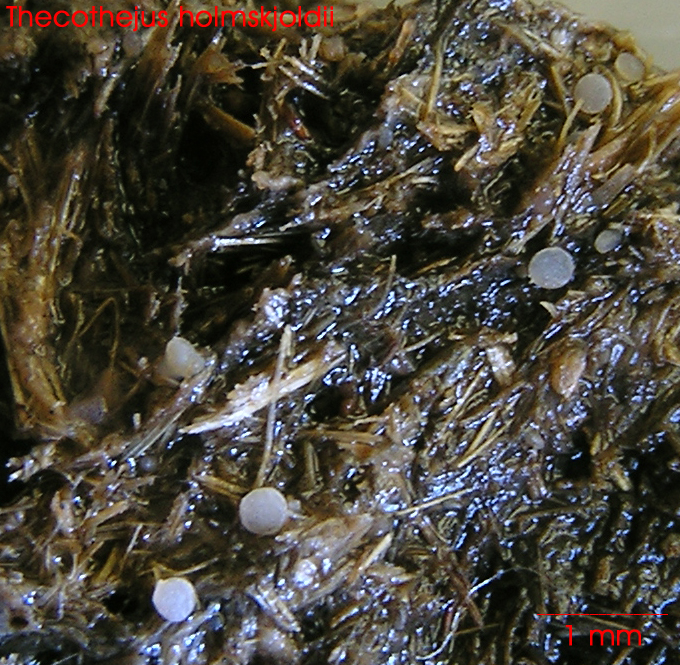
- Thecotheus holmskioldii

Scientific classification
- Kingdom: Fungi
- Division: Ascomycota
- Class: Pezizomycetes
- Order: Pezizales
- Family: Ascobolaceae
- Genus: Thecotheus; Boud.

Type species
- Thecotheus pelletieri (P. Crouan & H. Crouan) Boud. (1869)

= Thecotheus =

Genus of fungi

Thecotheus is a genus of fungi in the Ascobolaceae family. The genus has a widespread distribution, especially in temperate areas, and contains 17 species.
