= Sewage fungus =

Biofilm found in saprobic rivers

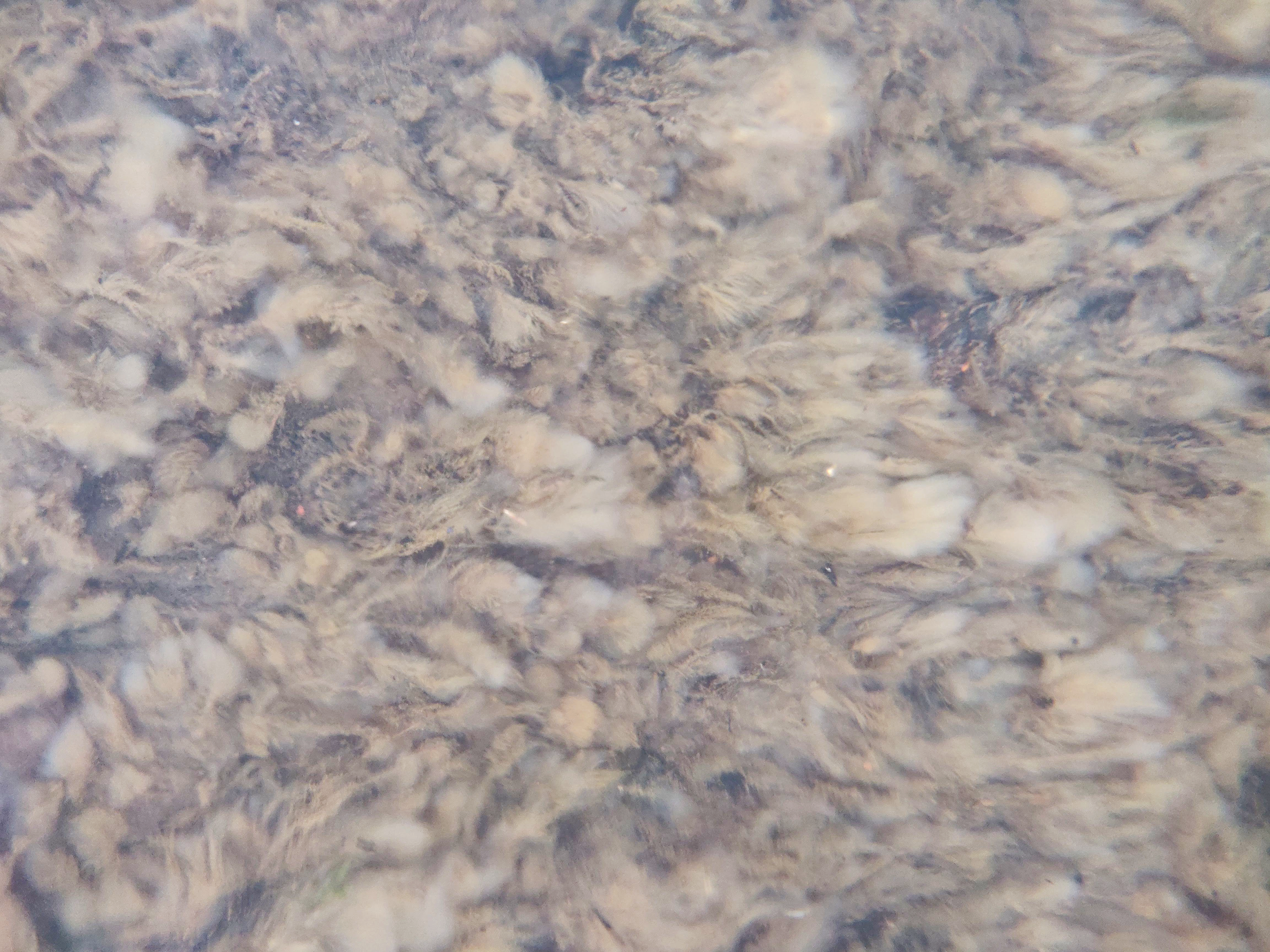
A photo of sewage fungus found in the River Crane (London, England)

Sewage fungus (also known as undesirable river biofilms, URBs) is a polymicrobial biofilm (a microbial mat) that proliferates in saprobic rivers and has been frequently used as a bioindicator of organic river pollution for the past century. Its presence has been strongly associated with discharges of untreated or inadequately treated sewage, yet its presence extends beyond these areas, with contributors including airport de-ice fluid runoff, papermill effluents, and agricultural runoff.

The name "sewage fungus" is somewhat of a misnomer, as these growths are not primarily fungal in nature. Instead, they are complex polymicrobial mats bound within a matrix of extracellular polymeric substances. The bacterial taxa most frequently associated with this phenomenon include Sphaerotilus natans, Zoogloea spp., Beggiatoa spp., and Rhodoferax spp.

== Environmental impacts ==
In addition to being a bioindicator of organic pollution in rivers and playing a vital role utilizing excess organic carbon in fluvial systems, sewage fungus causes significant ecological impacts through direct and indirect ecological pathways.

Sewage fungus thrives in the low dissolved oxygen (DO) environment of an organically polluted river. Whilst DO is required for sewage fungus growth, it readily outcompetes other benthic organisms at low DO, quickly smothering riverbeds, greatly altering the benthic habitat for invertebrates and fish spawning. The dominating growth of sewage fungus also reduces hyporheic exchange flows, an important part of a rivers self-cleaning system. Similar river biofilms are also reported to accumulate heavy metals and other toxic substances. within their matrix causing ecological impacts throughout the food web. As a heterotroph, sewage fungus uses considerably higher DO than an aquatic macrophyte of the same mass, it can maintain DO concentrations below thresholds required for other organisms. Once sewage fungus becomes established, it is difficult to remove, unless all sources of organic nutrients (pollution) are addressed, causing a further loss in biodiversity and other flora and fauna in the river. These ecological impacts and the striking visible presence of sewage fungus growth on a riverbed further affects people's perceptions and use of rivers.

== Microbial composition ==
Sewage fungus is a type of microbial mat, the specific composition of which is affected by the available nutrients (especially organic carbon sources) and the environmental drivers of each unique occurrence. However, several key taxa are reported as highly frequent and dominant within sewage fungus.

Sphaerotilus natans, has been strongly associated with this phenomenon since it was first studied and continues to be regarded as a key sewage fungus organism. Consequently, Sphaerotilus has been used seemingly synonymously with sewage fungus and a series of laboratory studies use S. natans as sewage fungus.

Other key taxa include the bacteria Zoogloea spp., Beggiatoa spp., Thiothrix spp., Flavobacterium spp., and Flexibacter spp. However, fungi (e.g., Leptomitus lacteus, Geotrichum candidum, and Fusarium aquaeductuum), algae (e.g., Cladophora glomerata) along with archaea and protozoa (e.g., Carchesium polypinum) also form integral and important pasts of the biofilm.

Recent genomic studies of sewage fungus composition have identified some of these taxa within airport de-icer implicated occurrences but have also identified new taxa not previously associated with sewage fungus: Rhodoferax as a dominant component of sewage fungus, and the presence of Thiothrix.

== Drivers of sewage fungus ==
Alongside the complex nutrient utilisation requirements of sewage fungus, there are several key environmental drivers including substrate type, flow velocity, temperature, shading/sunlight, and water chemistry (e.g. pH).

Flowing water is a requirement for sewage fungus growth, to provide a constant replenishment of nutrients. However, if the velocity of the river is too fast, then growths are scoured away, especially on more readily mobilised substrates. In turn, the specific flow of the river shapes the morphotype and structure of the biofilm. Intrinsically the substrate affects the upper limit of flow as more stable riverbeds are less readily mobilised in periods of higher flows. Surfaces such as large cobbles, anthropogenic litter (e.g., bricks), and concrete channels facilitate excellent sewage fungus growth, whereas fine sediments and gravel provide a less stable substrate.
