= Ascobolus immersus =

Scientific classification
- Domain: Eukaryota
- Kingdom: Fungi
- Division: Ascomycota
- Class: Pezizomycetes
- Order: Pezizales
- Family: Ascobolaceae
- Genus: Ascobolus
- Species: A. immersus

Binomial name
- Ascobolus immersus Pers., 1796

Species of fungus

Ascobolus immersus is a species of fungus belonging to the family Ascobolaceae.

It has cosmopolitan distribution. It is known to be coprophilous, growing on the dung of geese, sheep and cattle.
