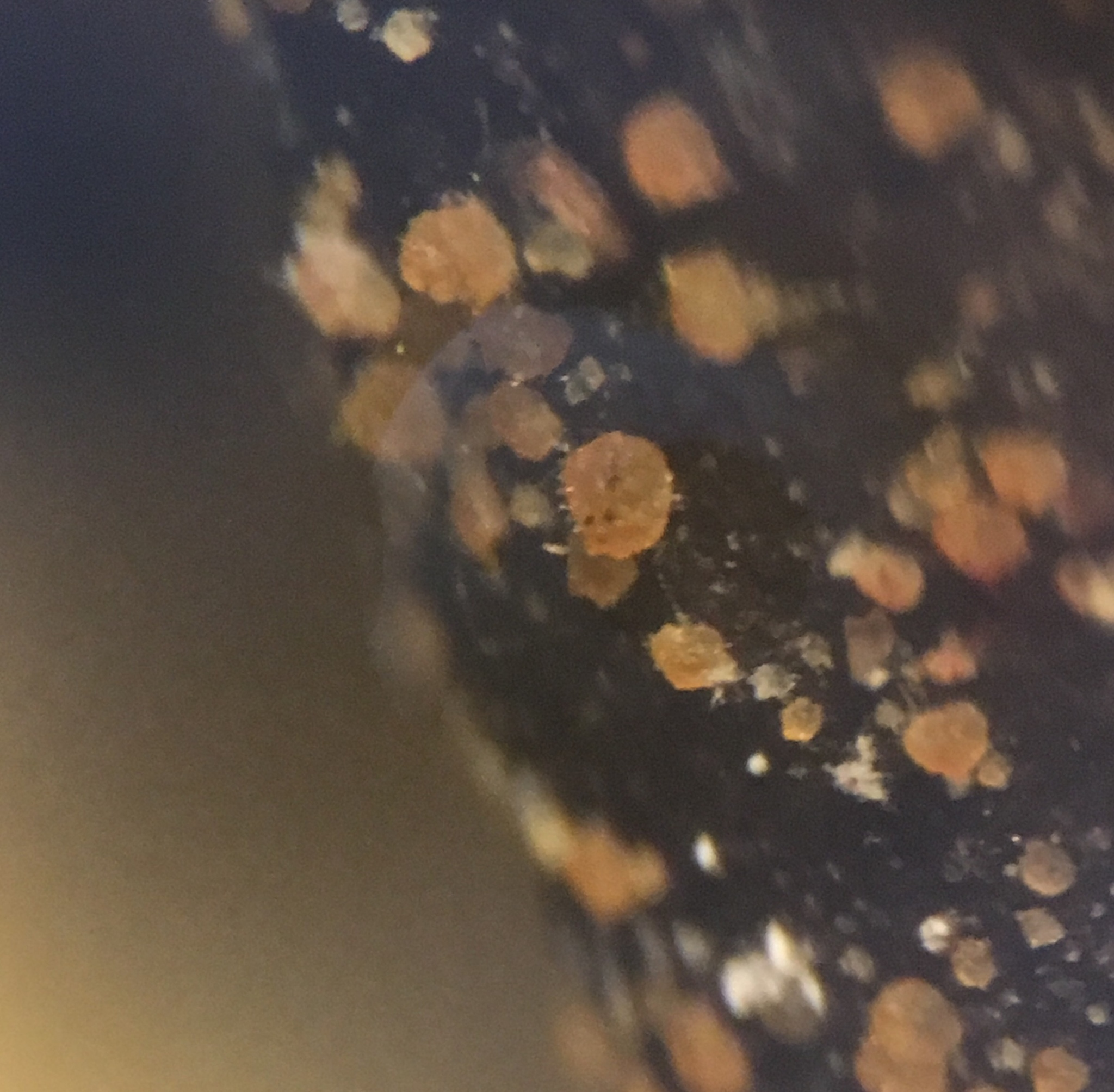
- Saccobolus citrinus

Scientific classification
- Kingdom: Fungi
- Division: Ascomycota
- Class: Pezizomycetes
- Order: Pezizales
- Family: Ascobolaceae
- Genus: Saccobolus; Boud.

Type species
- Saccobolus kervernii (P. Crouan & H. Crouan) Boud.

= Saccobolus =

Genus of fungi

Saccobolus is a genus of fungi in the family Ascobolaceae. The genus has a widespread distribution, and contains 27 species.

== Species ==
Species include:

- Saccobolus glaber
