= Ascobolus stercorarius =

Scientific classification
- Domain: Eukaryota
- Kingdom: Fungi
- Division: Ascomycota
- Class: Pezizomycetes
- Order: Pezizales
- Family: Ascobolaceae
- Genus: Ascobolus
- Species: A. stercorarius

Binomial name
- Ascobolus stercorarius Bull., 1788

Species of fungus

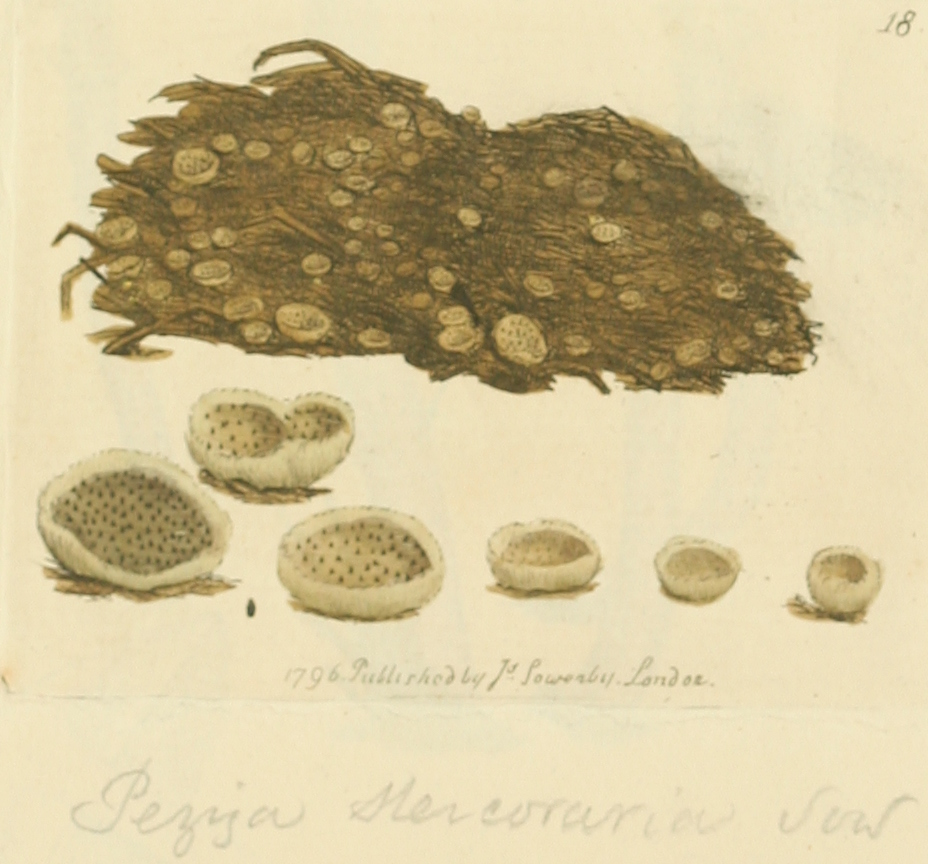

Ascobolus stercorarius is a species of apothecial fungus belonging to the family Ascobolaceae.

This is a European species appearing as yellowish discs, turning brown at maturity, up to 5 mm across on animal dung, especially cow, from spring to autumn.
