= Microbial mat =

Multi-layered sheet of microorganisms

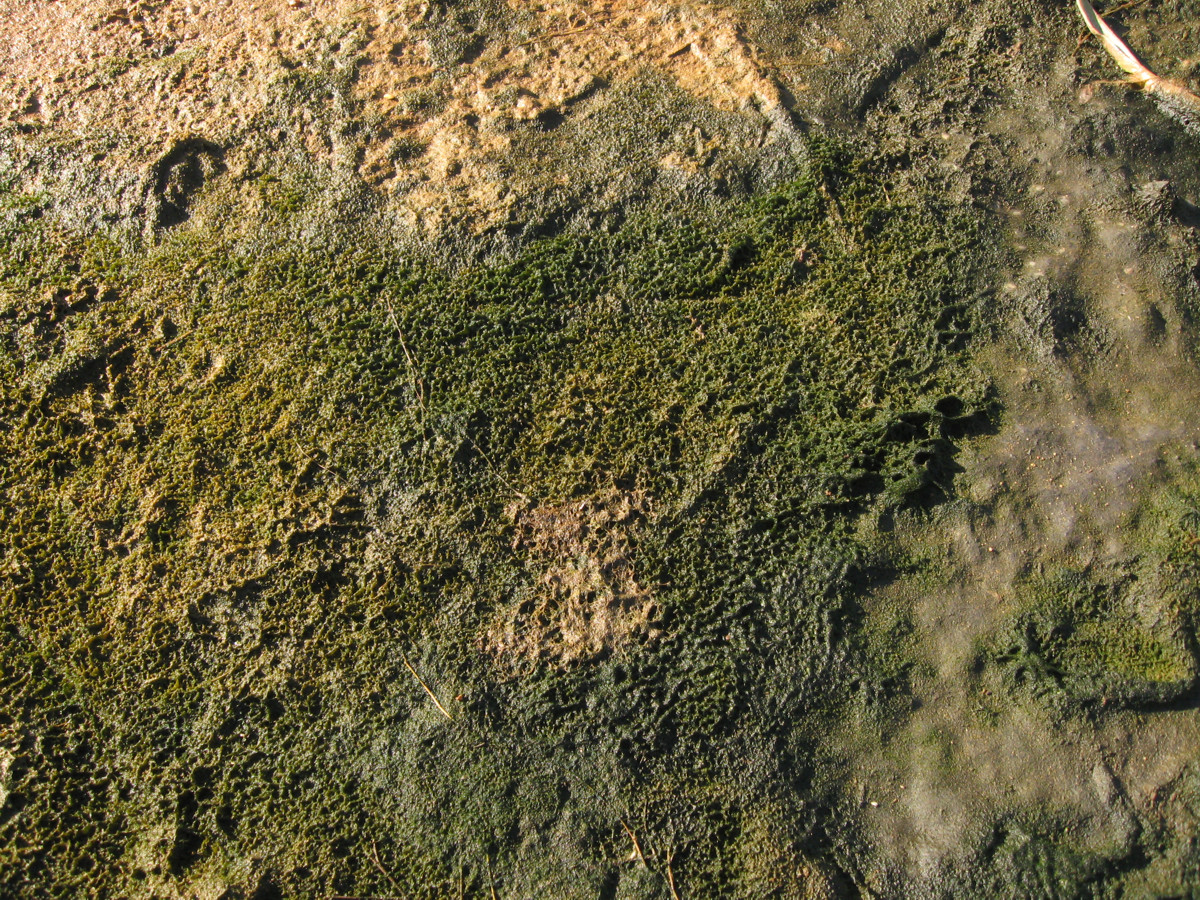
The cyanobacterial algal mat, salty lake on the White Sea seaside

A microbial mat is a multi-layered sheet or biofilm of microbial colonies, composed of mainly bacteria and/or archaea. Microbial mats grow at interfaces between different types of material, mostly on submerged or moist surfaces, but a few survive in deserts. A few are found as endosymbionts of animals.

Although only a few centimetres thick at most, microbial mats create a wide range of internal chemical environments, and hence generally consist of layers of microorganisms that can feed on or at least tolerate the dominant chemicals at their level and which are usually of closely related species. In moist conditions mats are usually held together by slimy substances secreted by the microorganisms. In many cases some of the bacteria form tangled webs of filaments which make the mat tougher. The best known physical forms are flat mats and stubby pillars called stromatolites, but there are also spherical forms.

Microbial mats are the earliest form of life on Earth for which there is good fossil evidence, from 3,500 million years ago, and have been the most important members and maintainers of the planet's ecosystems. Originally they depended on hydrothermal vents for energy and chemical "food", but the development of photosynthesis allowed mats to proliferate outside of these environments by utilizing a more widely available energy source, sunlight. The final and most significant stage of this liberation was the development of oxygen-producing photosynthesis, since the main chemical inputs for this are carbon dioxide and water.

As a result, microbial mats began to produce the atmosphere we know today, in which free oxygen is a vital component. At around the same time they may also have been the birthplace of the more complex eukaryote type of cell, of which all multicellular organisms are composed. Microbial mats were abundant on the shallow seabed until the Cambrian substrate revolution, when animals living in shallow seas increased their burrowing capabilities and thus broke up the surfaces of mats and let oxygenated water into the deeper layers, poisoning the oxygen-intolerant microorganisms that lived there. Although this revolution drove mats off soft floors of shallow seas, they still flourish in many environments where burrowing is limited or impossible, including rocky seabeds and shores, and hyper-saline and brackish lagoons. They are found also on the floors of the deep oceans.

Because of microbial mats' ability to use almost anything as "food", there is considerable interest in industrial uses of mats, especially for water treatment and for cleaning up pollution.

== Description ==
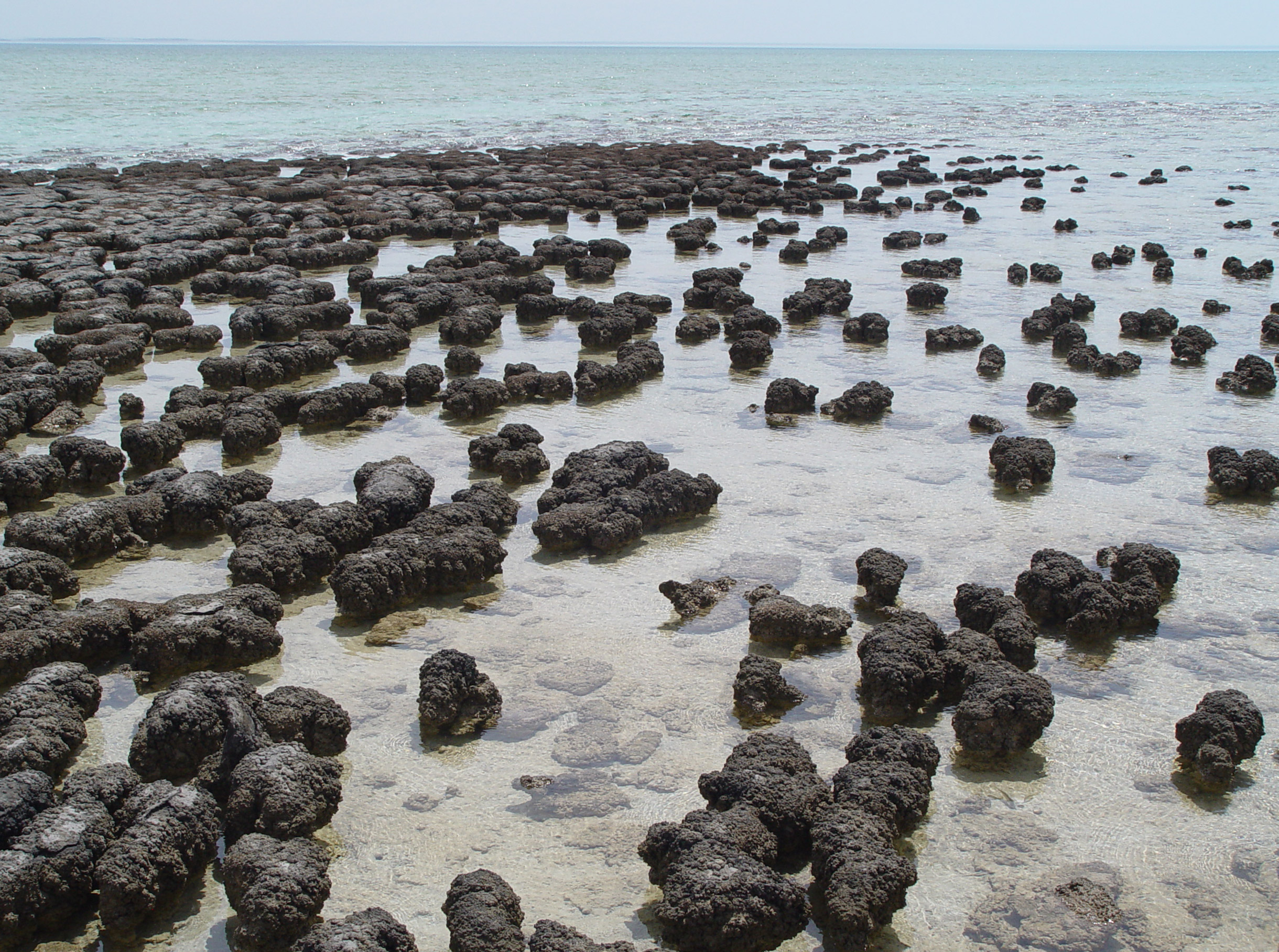
Stromatolites are formed by some microbial mats as the microbes slowly move upwards to avoid being smothered by sediment.

Microbial mats may also be referred to as algal mats and bacterial mats. They are a type of biofilm that is large enough to see with the naked eye and robust enough to survive moderate physical stresses. These colonies of bacteria form on surfaces at many types of interface, for example between water and the sediment or rock at the bottom, between air and rock or sediment, between soil and bed-rock, etc. Such interfaces form vertical chemical gradients, i.e. vertical variations in chemical composition, which make different levels suitable for different types of bacteria and thus divide microbial mats into layers, which may be sharply defined or may merge more gradually into each other. A variety of microbes are able to transcend the limits of diffusion by using "nanowires" to shuttle electrons from their metabolic reactions up to two centimetres deep in the sediment – for example, electrons can be transferred from reactions involving hydrogen sulfide deeper within the sediment to oxygen in the water, which acts as an electron acceptor.

The best-known types of microbial mat may be flat laminated mats, which form on approximately horizontal surfaces, and stromatolites, stubby pillars built as the microbes slowly move upwards to avoid being smothered by sediment deposited on them by water. However, there are also spherical mats, some on the outside of pellets of rock or other firm material and others inside spheres of sediment.

=== Structure ===
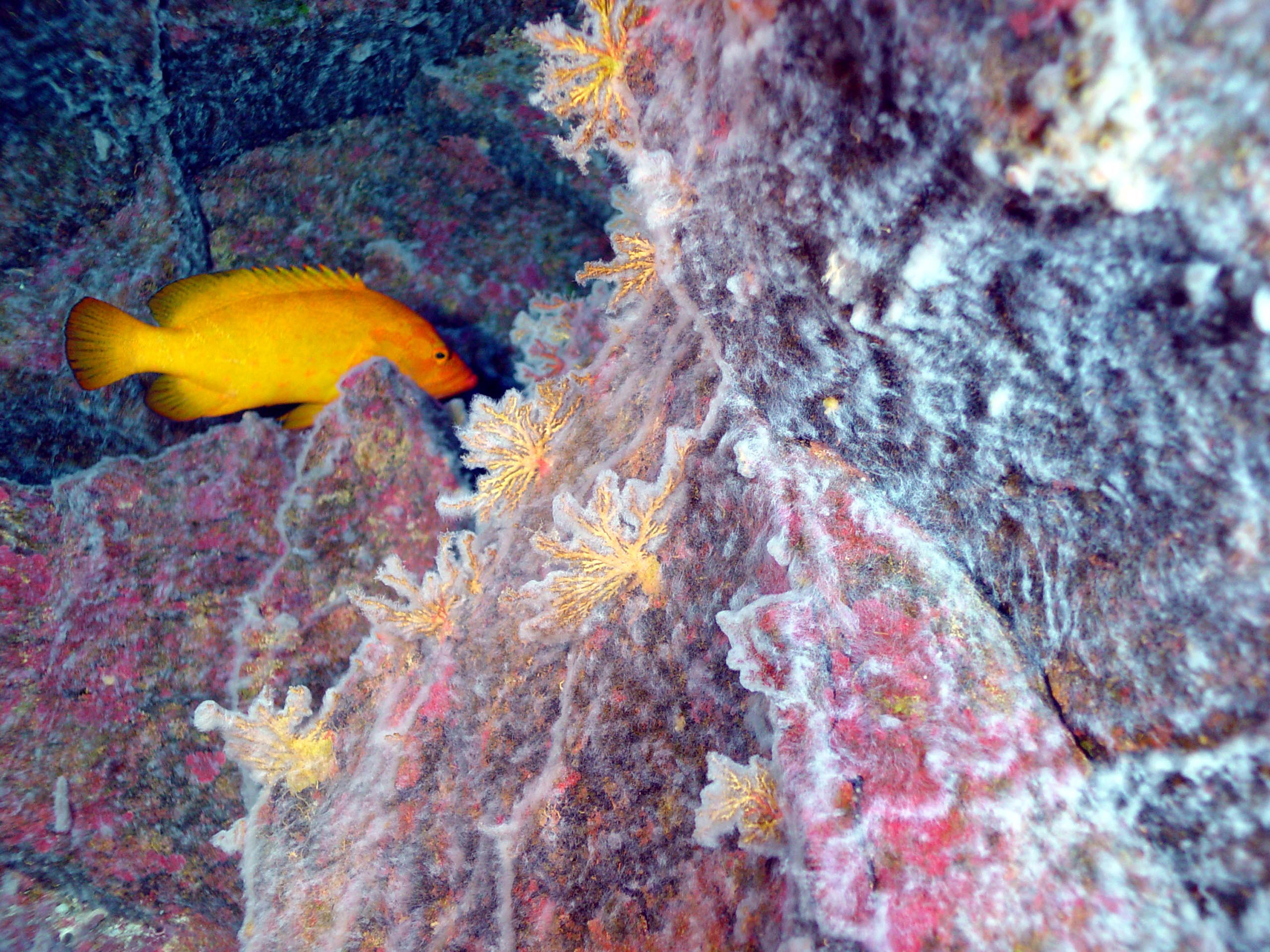
Chemosynthetic microbial mats covering photosynthetic red algae and coral. Hydrothermal vent and coral reef communities overlap at 190 m depth, at the Mariana arc. A golden hind swims nearby.

A microbial mat consists of several layers, each of which is dominated by specific types of microorganisms, mainly bacteria. Although the composition of individual mats varies depending on the environment, as a general rule the by-products of each group of microorganisms serve as "food" for other groups. In effect each mat forms its own food chain, with one or a few groups at the top of the food chain as their by-products are not consumed by other groups. Different types of microorganism dominate different layers based on their comparative advantage for living in that layer. In other words, they live in positions where they can out-perform other groups rather than where they would absolutely be most comfortable — ecological relationships between different groups are a combination of competition and co-operation. Since the metabolic capabilities of bacteria (what they can "eat" and what conditions they can tolerate) generally depend on their phylogeny (i.e. the most closely related groups have the most similar metabolisms), the different layers of a mat are divided both by their different metabolic contributions to the community and by their phylogenetic relationships.

In a wet environment where sunlight is the main source of energy, the uppermost layers are generally dominated by aerobic photosynthesizing cyanobacteria (blue-green bacteria whose color is caused by their having chlorophyll), while the lowest layers are generally dominated by anaerobic sulfate-reducing bacteria. Sometimes there are intermediate (oxygenated only in the daytime) layers inhabited by facultative anaerobic bacteria. For example, in hypersaline ponds near Guerrero Negro (Mexico) various kind of mats were explored. There are some mats with a middle purple layer inhabited by photosynthesizing purple bacteria. Some other mats have a white layer inhabited by chemotrophic sulfur oxidizing bacteria and beneath them an olive layer inhabited by photosynthesizing green sulfur bacteria and heterotrophic bacteria. However, this layer structure is not changeless during a day: some species of cyanobacteria migrate to deeper layers at morning, and go back at evening, to avoid intensive solar light and UV radiation at mid-day.

Microbial mats are generally held together and bound to their substrates by slimy extracellular polymeric substances which they secrete. In many cases some of the bacteria form filaments (threads), which tangle and thus increase the colonies' structural strength, especially if the filaments have sheaths (tough outer coverings).

This combination of slime and tangled threads attracts other microorganisms which become part of the mat community, for example protozoa, some of which feed on the mat-forming bacteria, and diatoms, which often seal the surfaces of submerged microbial mats with thin, parchment-like coverings.

Marine mats may grow to a few centimeters in thickness, of which only the top few millimeters are oxygenated.

=== Types of environment colonized ===
Underwater microbial mats have been described as layers that live by exploiting and to some extent modifying local chemical gradients, i.e. variations in the chemical composition. Thinner, less complex biofilms live in many sub-aerial environments, for example on rocks, on mineral particles such as sand, and within soil. They have to survive for long periods without liquid water, often in a dormant state. Microbial mats that live in tidal zones, such as those found in the Sippewissett salt marsh, often contain a large proportion of similar microorganisms that can survive for several hours without water.

Microbial mats and less complex types of biofilm are found at temperature ranges from –40 °C to +120 °C, because variations in pressure affect the temperatures at which water remains liquid.

They even appear as endosymbionts in some animals, for example in the hindguts of some echinoids.

=== Ecological and geological importance ===
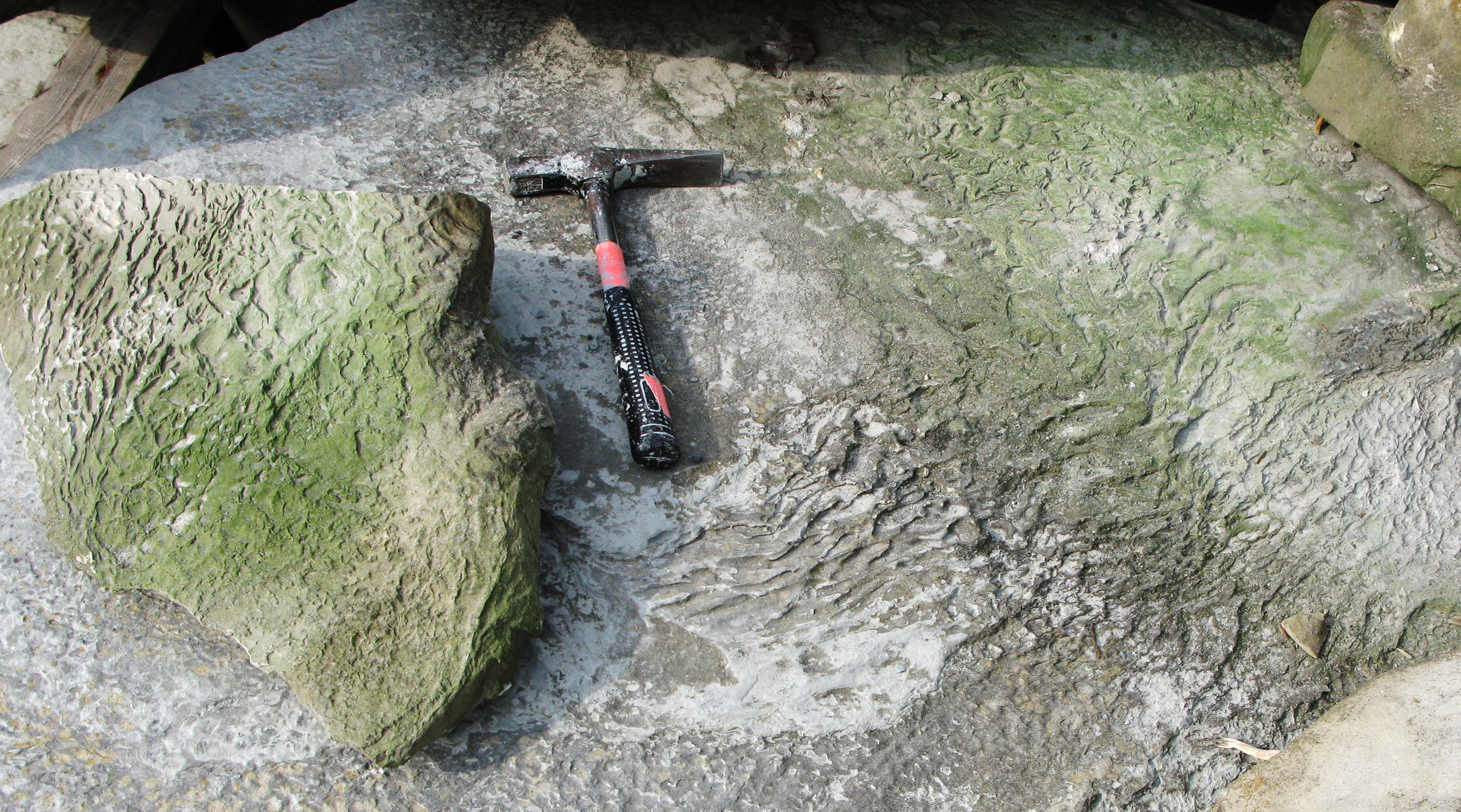
Wrinkled Kinneyia-type fossil sedimentary structures formed beneath cohesive microbial mats in peritidal zones. The image shows the location, in the Burgsvik beds of Sweden, where the texture was first identified as evidence of a fossil microbial mat.

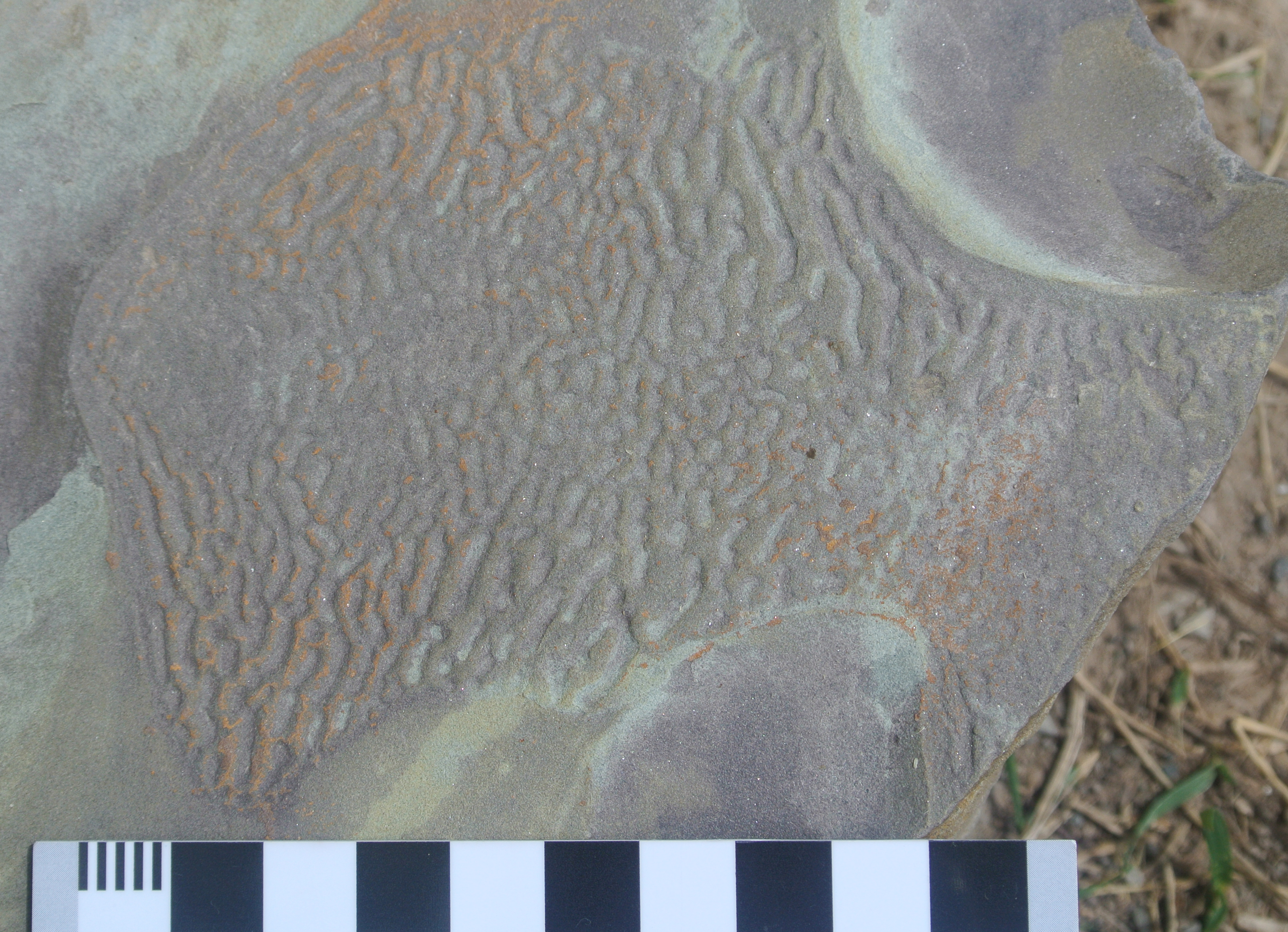
Fossil Kinneyia-like structure in the Grimsby Formation (Silurian) exposed in Niagara Gorge, New York

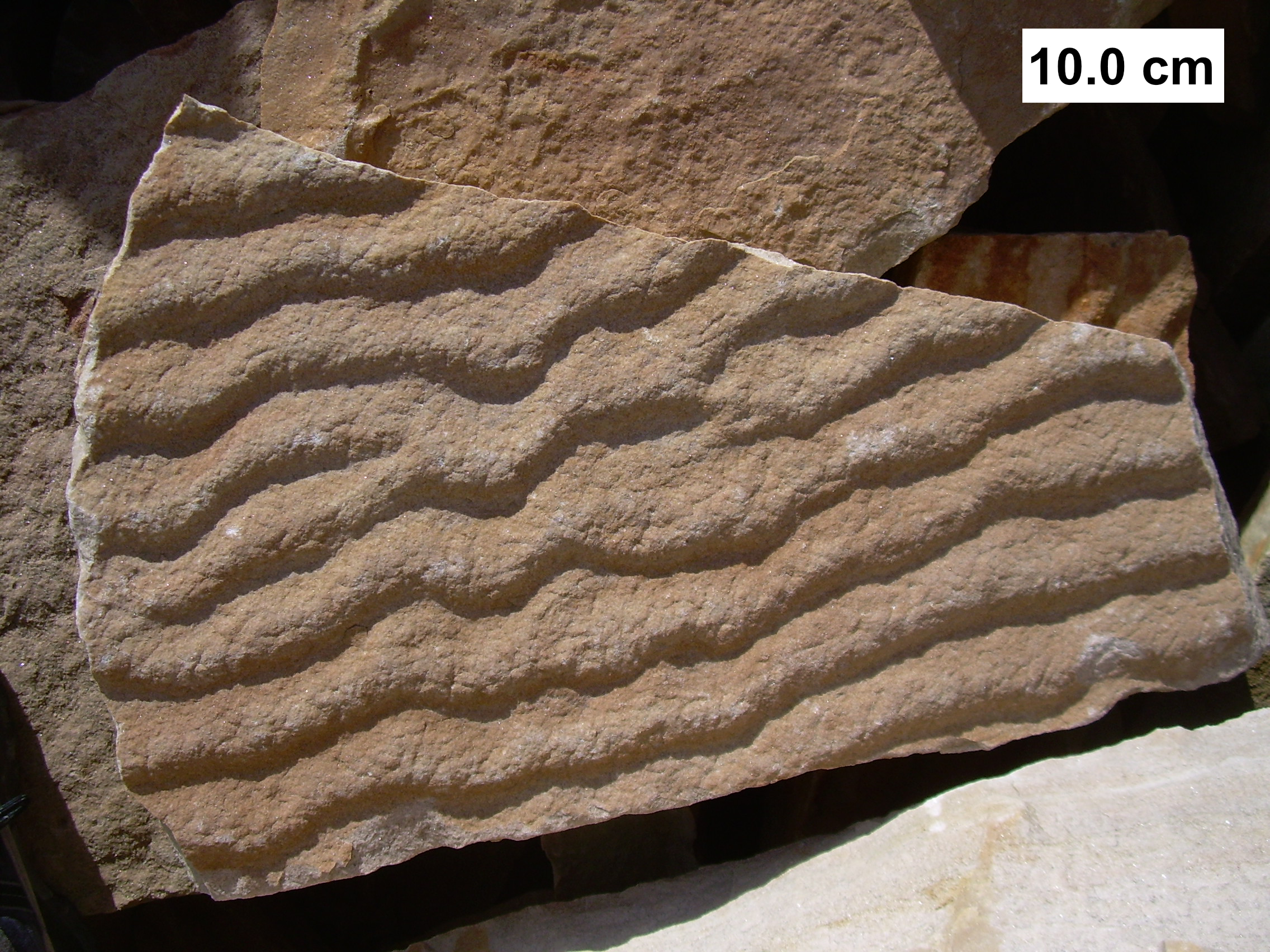
Blister-like fossil microbial mat on ripple-marked surface of a Cambrian tidal flat at Blackberry Hill, Wisconsin

Microbial mats use all of the types of metabolism and feeding strategy that have evolved on Earth—anoxygenic and oxygenic photosynthesis; anaerobic and aerobic chemotrophy (using chemicals rather than sunshine as a source of energy); organic and inorganic respiration and fermentation (i..e converting food into energy with and without using oxygen in the process); autotrophy (producing food from inorganic compounds) and heterotrophy (producing food only from organic compounds, by some combination of predation and detritivory).

Most sedimentary rocks and ore deposits have grown by a reef-like build-up rather than by "falling" out of the water, and this build-up has been at least influenced and perhaps sometimes caused by the actions of microbes. Stromatolites, bioherms (domes or columns similar internally to stromatolites) and biostromes (distinct sheets of sediment) are among such microbe-influenced build-ups. Other types of microbial mat have created wrinkled "elephant skin" textures in marine sediments, although it was many years before these textures were recognized as trace fossils of mats. Microbial mats have increased the concentration of metal in many ore deposits, and without this it would not be feasible to mine them—examples include iron (both sulfide and oxide ores), uranium, copper, silver and gold deposits.

== Role in the history of life ==
History of life

←	Meteor Bombardment ends; first geochemical signs of life

←	Earliest stromatolites

←	? Beginning of photosynthesis

←	? Beginning of atmospheric oxygen

←	? First eukaryotes

←	? First multicellular organisms

←	Ediacaran organisms

←	Cambrian substrate revolution

Phanerozoic eon
Proterozoic eon
Archean eon
Hadean eon

A very brief history of life on Earth.
Axis scale is in millions of years ago.

=== The earliest mats ===
Microbial mats are among the oldest clear signs of life, as microbially induced sedimentary structures (MISS) formed 3,480 million years ago have been found in western Australia. At that early stage the mats' structure may already have been similar to that of modern mats that do not include photosynthesizing bacteria. It is even possible that non-photosynthesizing mats were present as early as 4,000 million years ago. If so, their energy source would have been hydrothermal vents (high-pressure hot springs around submerged volcanoes), and the evolutionary split between bacteria and archea may also have occurred around this time.

The earliest mats may have been small, single-species biofilms of chemotrophs that relied on hydrothermal vents to supply both energy and chemical "food". Within a short time (by geological standards) the build-up of dead microorganisms would have created an ecological niche for scavenging heterotrophs, possibly methane-emitting and sulfate-reducing organisms that would have formed new layers in the mats and enriched their supply of biologically useful chemicals.

=== Photosynthesis ===
It is generally thought that photosynthesis, the biological generation of chemical energy from light, evolved shortly after 3,000 million years ago (3 billion). However an isotope analysis suggests that oxygenic photosynthesis may have been widespread as early as 3,500 million years ago. There are several different types of photosynthetic reaction, and analysis of bacterial DNA indicates that photosynthesis first arose in anoxygenic purple bacteria, while the oxygenic photosynthesis seen in cyanobacteria and much later in plants was the last to evolve.

The earliest photosynthesis may have been powered by infra-red light, using modified versions of pigments whose original function was to detect infra-red heat emissions from hydrothermal vents. The development of photosynthetic energy generation enabled the microorganisms first to colonize wider areas around vents and then to use sunlight as an energy source. The role of the hydrothermal vents was now limited to supplying reduced metals into the oceans as a whole rather than being the main supporters of life in specific locations. Heterotrophic scavengers would have accompanied the photosynthesizers in their migration out of the "hydrothermal ghetto".

The evolution of purple bacteria, which do not produce or use oxygen but can tolerate it, enabled mats to colonize areas that locally had relatively high concentrations of oxygen, which is toxic to organisms that are not adapted to it. Microbial mats could have been separated into oxidized and reduced layers.

==== Cyanobacteria and oxygen ====
The last major stage in the evolution of microbial mats was the appearance of cyanobacteria, photosynthesizers which both produce and use oxygen. This gave undersea mats their typical modern structure: an oxygen-rich top layer of cyanobacteria; a layer of photosynthesizing purple bacteria that could tolerate oxygen; and oxygen-free, H_{2}S-dominated lower layers of heterotrophic scavengers, mainly methane-emitting and sulfate-reducing organisms.

It is estimated that the appearance of oxygenic photosynthesis increased biological productivity by a factor of between 100 and 1,000. All photosynthetic reactions require a reducing agent, but the significance of oxygenic photosynthesis is that it uses water as a reducing agent, and water is much more plentiful than the geologically produced reducing agents on which photosynthesis previously depended. The resulting increases in the populations of photosynthesizing bacteria in the top layers of microbial mats would have caused corresponding population increases among the chemotrophic and heterotrophic microorganisms that inhabited the lower layers and which fed respectively on the by-products of the photosynthesizers and on the corpses and / or living bodies of the other mat organisms. These increases would have made microbial mats the planet's dominant ecosystems. From this point onwards life itself would have produced significantly more of the resources it needed than did geochemical processes.

Oxygenic photosynthesis in microbial mats would also have increased the free oxygen content of the Earth's atmosphere, both directly by emitting oxygen and because the mats emitted molecular hydrogen (H_{2}), some of which would have escaped from the Earth's atmosphere before it could re-combine with free oxygen to form more water. Microbial mats thus likely played a major role in the evolution of organisms which could first tolerate free oxygen and then use it as an energy source. Oxygen is toxic to organisms that are not adapted to it, but greatly increases the metabolic efficiency of oxygen-adapted organisms — for example anaerobic fermentation produces a net yield of two molecules of adenosine triphosphate, cells' internal "fuel", per molecule of glucose, while aerobic respiration produces a net yield of 36. The oxygenation of the atmosphere was a prerequisite for the evolution of the more complex eukaryote type of cell, from which all multicellular organisms are built.

Cyanobacteria have the most complete biochemical "toolkits" of all the mat-forming organisms: the photosynthesis mechanisms of both green bacteria and purple bacteria; oxygen production; and the Calvin cycle, which converts carbon dioxide and water into carbohydrates and sugars. It is likely that they acquired many of these sub-systems from existing mat organisms, by some combination of horizontal gene transfer and endosymbiosis followed by fusion. Whatever the causes, cyanobacteria are the most self-sufficient of the mat organisms and were well-adapted to strike out on their own both as floating mats and as the first of the phytoplankton, which forms the basis of most marine food chains.

=== Origin of eukaryotes ===
The time at which eukaryotes first appeared is still uncertain: there is reasonable evidence that fossils dated between 1,600 million years ago and 2,100 million years ago represent eukaryotes, but the presence of steranes in Australian shales may indicate that eukaryotes were present 2,700 million years ago. There is still debate about the origins of eukaryotes, and many of the theories focus on the idea that a bacterium first became an endosymbiont of an anaerobic archean and then fused with it to become one organism. If such endosymbiosis was an important factor, microbial mats would have encouraged it. There are two known variations of this scenario:

- The boundary between the oxygenated and oxygen-free zones of a mat would have moved up when photosynthesis shut down at night and back down when photosynthesis resumed after the next sunrise. Symbiosis between independent aerobic and anaerobic organisms would have enabled both to live comfortably in the zone that was subject to oxygen "tides", and subsequent endosymbiosis would have made such partnerships more mobile.
- The initial partnership may have been between anaerobic archea that required molecular hydrogen (H_{2}) and heterotrophic bacteria that produced it and could live both with and without oxygen.

=== Life on land ===
Microbial mats from ~1,200 million years ago provide the first evidence of life in the terrestrial realm.

=== The earliest multicellular animals ===
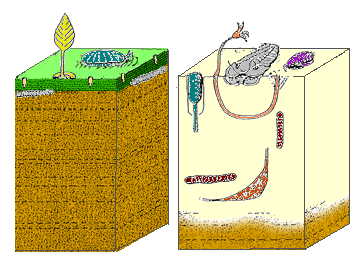
Before and after the Cambrian substrate revolution

The Ediacara biota are the earliest widely accepted evidence of multicellular animals. Most Ediacaran strata with the "elephant skin" texture characteristic of microbial mats contain fossils, and Ediacaran fossils are hardly ever found in beds that do not contain these microbial mats. Adolf Seilacher categorized the animals as: "mat encrusters", which were permanently attached to the mat; "mat scratchers", which grazed the surface of the mat without destroying it; "mat stickers", suspension feeders that were partially embedded in the mat; and "undermat miners", which burrowed underneath the mat and fed on decomposing mat material.

=== The Cambrian substrate revolution ===
In the Early Cambrian, however, organisms began to burrow vertically for protection or food, breaking down the microbial mats, and thus allowing water and oxygen to penetrate a considerable distance below the surface and kill the oxygen-intolerant microorganisms in the lower layers. As a result of this Cambrian substrate revolution, marine microbial mats are confined to environments in which burrowing is non-existent or negligible: very harsh environments, such as hyper-saline lagoons or brackish estuaries, which are uninhabitable for the burrowing organisms that broke up the mats; rocky "floors" which the burrowers cannot penetrate; the depths of the oceans, where burrowing activity today is at a similar level to that in the shallow coastal seas before the revolution.

=== Current status ===
Although the Cambrian substrate revolution opened up new niches for animals, it was not catastrophic for microbial mats, but it did greatly reduce their extent.

== Use of microbial mats in paleontology ==
Most fossils preserve only the hard parts of organisms, e.g. shells, and so provide direct information only about those structures. That makes the rare cases where soft-bodied fossils are preserved (the remains of soft-bodied organisms and also of the soft parts of organisms for which only hard parts such as shells are usually found) extremely valuable. Microbial mats help to preserve soft-bodied fossils by:

- Capturing corpses on the sticky surfaces of mats and thus preventing them from floating or drifting away.
- Physically protecting them from being eaten by scavengers and broken up by burrowing animals, and protecting fossil-bearing sediments from erosion. For example, the speed of water current required to erode sediment bound by a mat is 20–30 times as great as the speed required to erode a bare sediment.
- Preventing or reducing decay both by physically screening the remains from decay-causing bacteria and by creating chemical conditions that are hostile to decay-causing bacteria.
- Preserving tracks and burrows by protecting them from erosion. Many trace fossils date from significantly earlier than the body fossils of animals that are thought to have been capable of making them and thus improve paleontologists' estimates of when animals with these capabilities first appeared.

== Industrial uses ==
The ability of microbial mat communities to use a vast range of "foods" has recently led to interest in industrial uses. There have been trials of microbial mats for purifying water, both for human use and in fish farming, and studies of their potential for cleaning up oil spills. As a result of the growing commercial potential, there have been applications for and grants of patents relating to the growing, installation and use of microbial mats, mainly for cleaning up pollutants and waste products.

== See also ==
- Biological soil crust
- Cambrian substrate revolution
- Cyanobacteria
- Ediacaran type preservation
- Evolutionary history of life
- Sippewissett Microbial Mat
- Sewage fungus
- Taisui (biological object)
