= Ascobolus brassicae =

Scientific classification
- Domain: Eukaryota
- Kingdom: Fungi
- Division: Ascomycota
- Class: Pezizomycetes
- Order: Pezizales
- Family: Ascobolaceae
- Genus: Ascobolus
- Species: A. brassicae

Binomial name
- Ascobolus brassicae P.Crouan & H.Crouan (1857)

Species of fungus

Ascobolus brassicae is a species of apothecial fungus belonging to the family Ascobolaceae.

This is a European species appearing as tiny off-white (later turning purple) discs, with toothed edges, up to 1 mm across on animal dung, especially that of rodents. It is also found on rotting Brassica stems which gives rise to the specific name.
