= Cleistoiodophanus =

Scientific classification
- Kingdom: Fungi
- Division: Ascomycota
- Class: Pezizomycetes
- Order: Pezizales
- Family: Ascobolaceae
- Genus: Cleistoiodophanus; J.L. Bezerra & Kimbr.

Type species
- Cleistoiodophanus conglutinatus J.L. Bezerra & Kimbr.

Genus of fungi

Cleistoiodophanus is a genus of fungi in the Ascobolaceae family. The genus is monotypic, containing the species Cleistoiodophanus conglutinatus, found in the United States.
