= Ascophanus =

Scientific classification
- Domain: Eukaryota
- Kingdom: Fungi
- Division: Ascomycota
- Class: Pezizomycetes
- Order: Pezizales
- Family: Ascobolaceae
- Genus: Ascophanus; Boud.

Type species
- Ascophanus granuliformis (P. Crouan & H. Crouan) Boud.

Genus of fungi

Ascophanus is a genus of fungi in the Ascobolaceae family. The genus has a widespread distribution (especially in temperate areas), and contains 20 species, most of which grow on dung.

== Selected species ==
Note : this list is not complete.

Ascophanus bresadolae Boud.
Ascophanus cinerellus (P. Karst.) Speg.
Ascophanus coemansii Boud.
Ascophanus consociatus (Berk. & Broome) W. Phillips
Ascophanus globosopulvinatus (Crossl.) Boud. ex Ramsb.
Ascophanus glumarum (Desm.) Boud.
Ascophanus minutellus (P. Karst.) P. Karst.
Ascophanus minutissimus Boud.
Ascophanus subfuscus (P. Crouan & H. Crouan) Boud.

List source :
