= Cubonia =

Scientific classification
- Kingdom: Fungi
- Division: Ascomycota
- Class: Pezizomycetes
- Order: Pezizales
- Family: Ascobolaceae
- Genus: Cubonia; Sacc.

Type species
- Cubonia brachyasca (Marchal & É.J. Marchal) Sacc.

Species
- Cubonia brachyasca Cubonia bulbifera Cubonia dentata

Genus of fungi

Cubonia is a genus of fungi in the Ascobolaceae family. The genus contains three species found in Europe.
