= Algal mat =

Microbial mat that forms on the surface of water or rocks

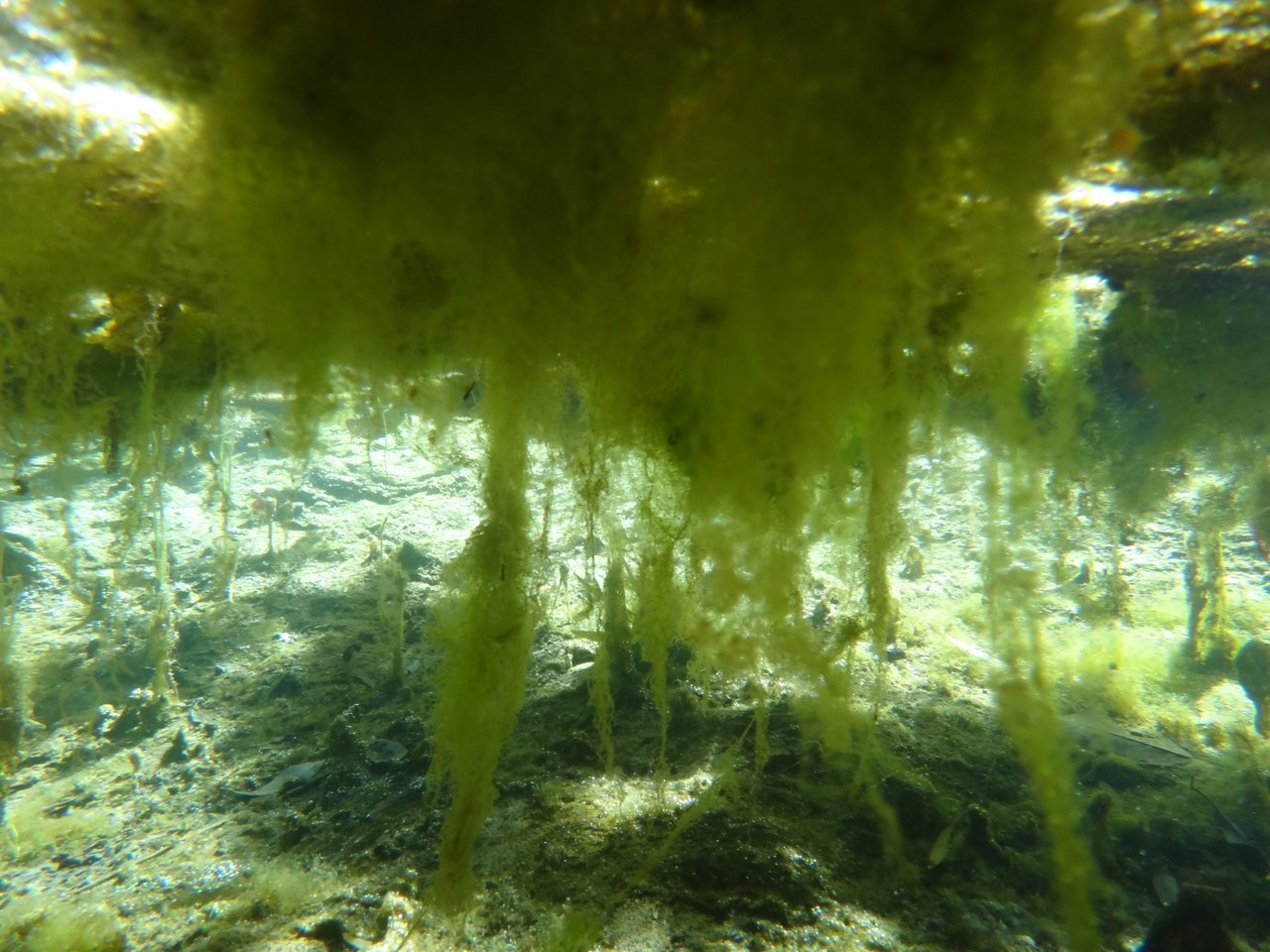
Beneath a floating algal mat

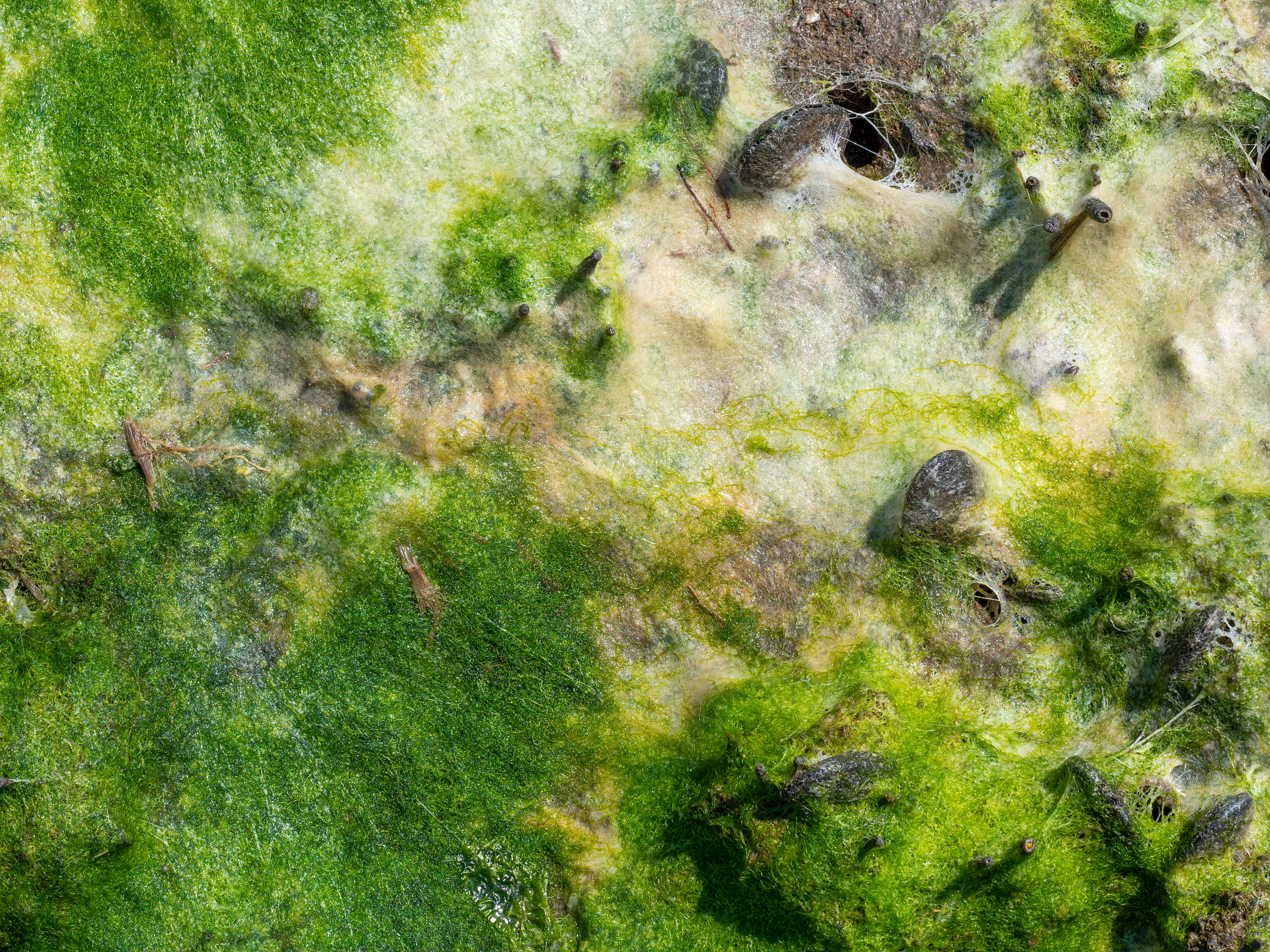
Algal mat from above

Algal mats are one of many types of microbial mat that forms on the surface of water or rocks. They are typically composed of blue-green cyanobacteria and sediments. Formation occurs when alternating layers of blue-green bacteria and sediments are deposited or grow in place, creating dark-laminated layers. Stromatolites are prime examples of algal mats. Algal mats played an important role in the Great Oxidation Event on Earth some 2.3 billion years ago. Algal mats can become a significant ecological problem, if the mats grow so expansive or thick as to disrupt the other underwater marine life by blocking the sunlight or producing toxic chemicals.

== Cyanobacteria forming algal mats ==
Cyanobacteria found in sedimentary rocks indicate that bacterial life began on Earth during the Precambrian age. Fossilized cyanobacteria are commonly found in rocks that date back to Mesoproterozoic. Cyanobacteria are photoautotrophs in nature; they convert carbon dioxide and sunlight into food and energy via photosynthesis. Some species are also able to fix atmospheric nitrogen and convert it into the biologically usable form of nitrate or nitrite. This gives them competitive advantage over other organisms that may be limited by the shortage of biologically available nitrogen. The cyanobacteria colonies contain two types of cells, the regular cells with chlorophyll carrying out the photosynthesis, and heterocysts which fix the nitrogen. These heterocysts have thick walls and lack chlorophyll, both of which limits their exposure to oxygen, the presence of which inhibits nitrogen fixation. For the same reason, fixation may also be limited to nighttime when the light-dependent reactions of photosynthesis are shut down, minimizing oxygen production.

== Stromatolites ==
Stromatolites are alternating layers of cyanobacteria and sediments. The grain size of sediment portion of stromatolites is affected by the depositional environment. During the Proterozoic, stromatolites' compositions were dominated by micrite and thinly laminated lime mud, with thicknesses no greater than 100 microns. Modern stromatolites are characterized by their thicker and more irregular laminations due to coarser grain size. Stromatolites trap sediment particles when the particles come to a rest from wave agitation. Trapping is separate process where filaments of bacteria traps the particle, provided the angle of the filaments are still within the limits before the grain rolls off due to overcoming the friction of the film. The length of the cyanobacterial filaments plays an important role in deciding the grain size trapped. It has been noted that these bacterial mats were marked by geochemical areas, such as volcanism and tectonics. They favour harsh environments that are either nutrient-depleted or have high salinity levels. This resilience may also be due to the autotrophic lifestyle of the bacteria, which enables them to thrive in a variety of harsh environments. Stromatolites can be found in places with ranging temperature such as in the marine, limnic and soil

== The importance of algal mats in the past ==
Algal mats consist largely of filaments made of autotrophic bacteria and fine-grained particles. These bacterial are well known for the formation of stromatolites. Phototrophic bacteria such as cyanobacteria are evolutionary organisms responsible for the increased oxygen levels during the Proterozoic age. The event was known as The Great Oxidation Event, during which complex eukaryotic life forms originated, potentially due to the increased oxygen availability. Preserved stromatolites are called stromatoliths. They can be easily recognized by their crystallized, thinly laminated layers and their domed, columnar or conical shapes. However, the same cannot be said for stromatolites that were not crystallized. The lack of many well-preserved stromatolites has been proposed as a consequence of ongoing diagenesis during formation. Diagenesis is a weathering process where newly deposited sediments lies on top of the old sedimentary bed, buried and compacted, lithified and uplifted to the surface as sedimentary rocks.

== Negative impacts of algal mats ==
The rapid formation of algal mats can result in harmful algal blooms (HABs), also known as red tides or green tides. HABs have been known to produce a wide range of toxins, with newer toxins discovered frequently, which makes the task of understanding these phenomena increasingly difficult. HABs can be found in water of high importance for economic and environment; with salinity ranging from low to high such as in rivers and lakes to reservoirs and oceans. Toxins can seep into the water column, from which they may be introduced into the local water supply, affecting humans and livestock. Toxins can have either direct or indirect effects on an organism. Some marine life is directly susceptible to toxins caused by HABs, while others are affected through accumulation of toxins over a period of time. This bioaccumulation process typically affects organisms such as filter-feeding shellfish and secondary consumers. It has been estimated that there are thousands of human poisoning cases annually in Asia from toxic water. Single HAB fish-kill events in Korea have been estimated to have cost millions of dollars, and in Japan such events have been estimated to have resulted in losses of fish worth more than $300 million.

Moreover, some HABs are harmful to the ecosystem simply by their sheer biomass accumulation. Such biomass accumulation can lead to a multitude of negative consequences. For one, their growth and proliferation can reduce the light penetration in the water column, thereby reducing habitat suitability for the growth of submersed grasses. Exceedingly high biomass can also cause fish gills to clog, leading to suffocation. High biomass blooms can also lead to the development of “dead zones”, formed when the algae begin to die and their decomposition depletes the water of oxygen. Dead zones are unable to support (aerobic) aquatic life, and are responsible for losses of millions of dollars’ worth of fish annually.

== Potential applications of algal mats ==
Third generation biofuel feedstocks are represented by both micro- and macro- algae, which present further advantages over the previous generations. (The first generation biofuels are made from edible feedstock like corn, soybean, sugarcane, and rapeseed. Second generation of biofuels from waste and dedicated lignocellulosic feedstock shave advantages over those of first generation.) Marine and aquatic biomass tentatively demonstrates high yield while requiring minimal use of arable land. Major advantages of algae are: no competition with food crops for arable land, high growth rates, and low fractions of lignin which reduces the need for energy-intensive pretreatment and compatibility with biorefinery approach implementation. It has been proven that macroalgae can reach 2–20 times the production potential of conventional terrestrial energy crops However, some disadvantages such as the presence of high water content, seasonal chemical composition and the occurrence of inhibitory phenomena during anaerobic digestion, make algal biofuels not yet economically feasible although they are more environmental friendly than fossil fuels.
