= Taisui (biological object) =

Microbial mat in traditional Chinese medicine

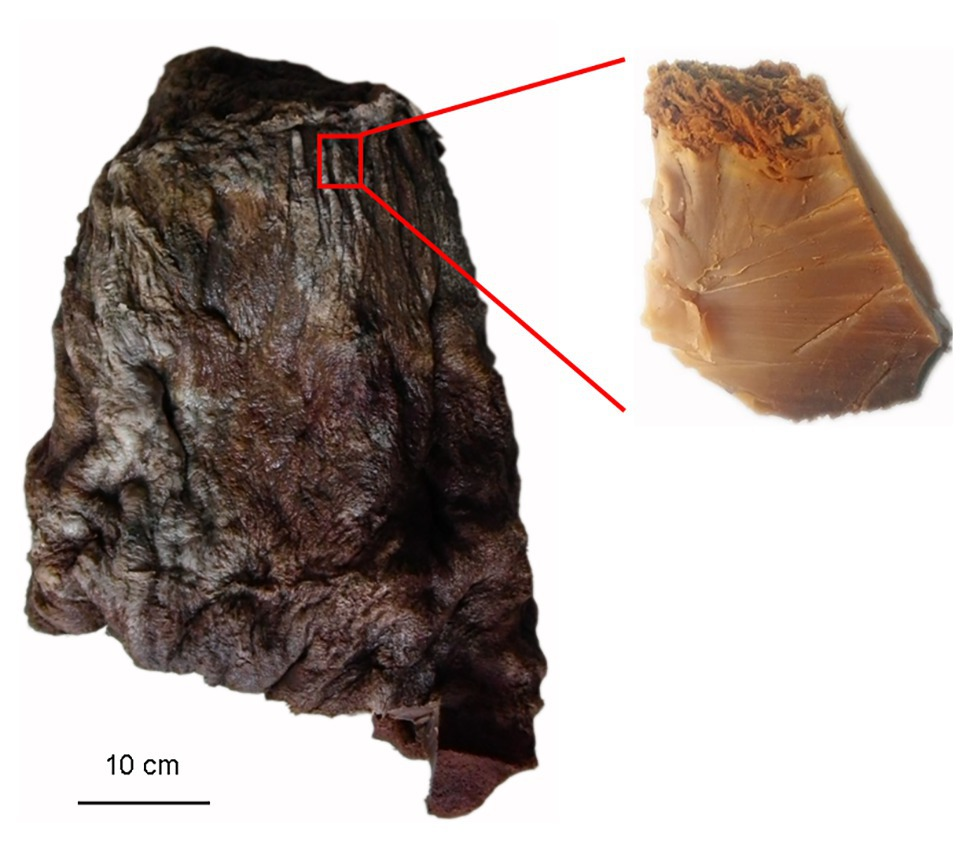
Taisui sample TS-2007S which was subjected to analysis

Taisui (太岁) is the Chinese name used for a biological object thought to be a microbial mat that is found in subsoil and made up of fungi, bacteria, archaea, myxomycetes and their metabolic products. They appear like jelly and have a meat-like fibrous structure. Ancient Chinese medical literature attributed health-giving and longevity-enhancing medical properties to taisui. Taisui specimens are rare and nearly 200 modern finds have been reportedly dug up since 1963. They grow slowly in arid and barren soils and their compositions have varied with sample and include myxomycetes, bacteria, fungi, and archaea. Sequencing of a sample identified the bacteria Pseudomonas, Acinetobacter; and Cladosporium, Trichoderma, Penicillium, Fusarium as the main fungi. The archaea included Methanobacterium, Methanobrevibacter, and Methanosphaera, while other samples have shown variations in the compositions of the dominant organisms.

Meat-like samples of taisui have polyvinyl alcohol and polyacrylic acid. They have been traditionally used in Chinese medicine with claims of a range of health benefits.
