= NADH-ubiquinone oxidoreductase =

NADH-ubiquinone oxidoreductase may refer to:

- NADH dehydrogenase
- NADH:ubiquinone reductase (non-electrogenic)
