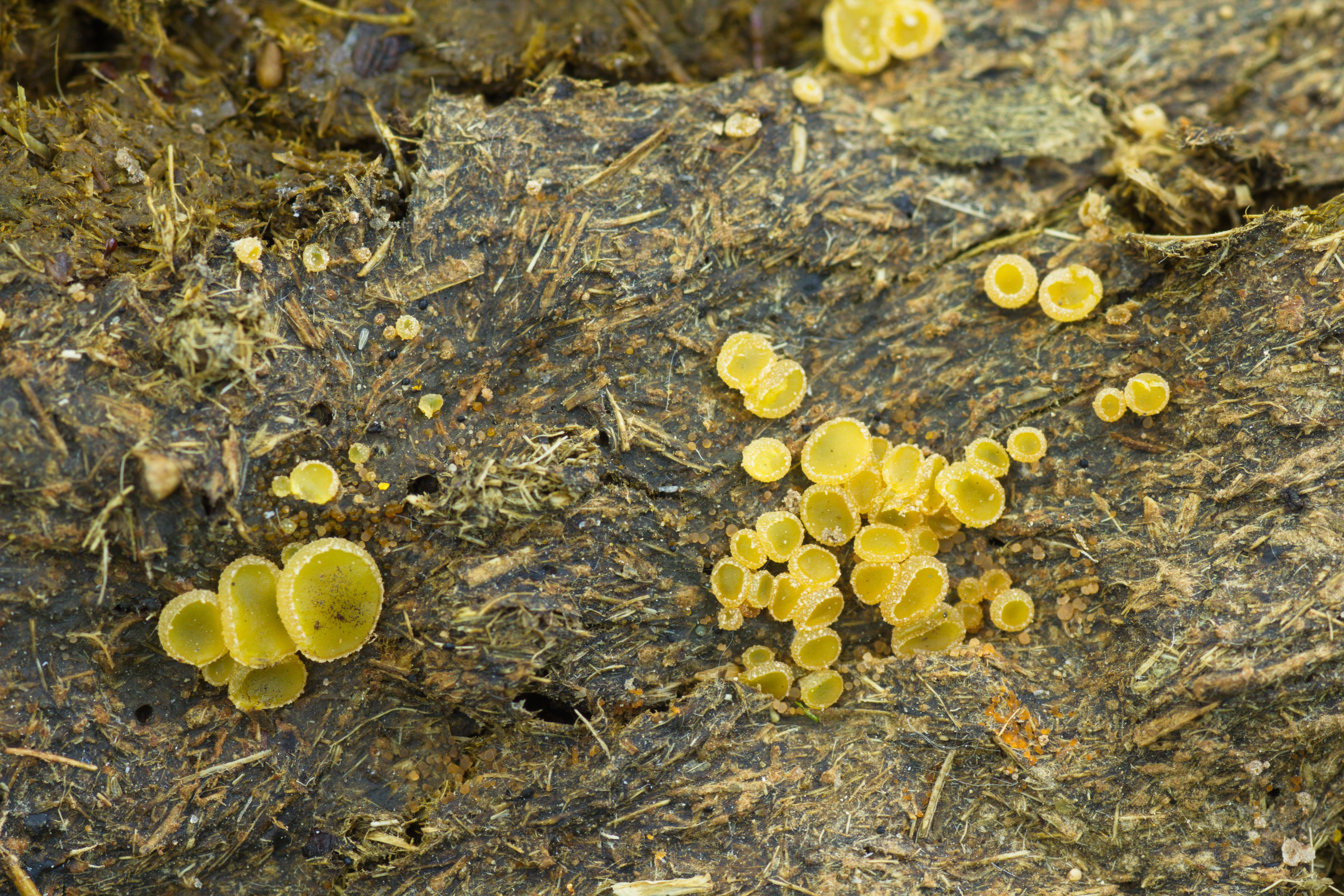
- Ascobolus spp. growing on cow dung

Scientific classification
- Kingdom: Fungi
- Division: Ascomycota
- Class: Pezizomycetes
- Order: Pezizales
- Family: Ascobolaceae; Boud. ex Sacc. (1984)

Type genus
- Ascobolus Pers. (1972)

Genera
- Ascobolus; Ascophanus; Cleistoiodophanus; Cubonia; Saccobolus; Thecotheus

= Ascobolaceae =

Family of fungi

The Ascobolaceae are a family of fungi in the order Pezizales. A 2008 estimate places 6 genera and 129 species in the family.

== Description ==
Most fruiting bodies of the disk-like ascobolaceae examined, are round and without conidium. All members of this family of fungi have a saprobiontic lifestyle, feeding on decaying and dead matter.

== Taxonomy ==
- Ascobolaceae with 4 different genera
  - Ascobolus
  - Cubonia
  - Saccobolus
  - Thecotheus

== Examples ==
Ascobolus michaudii and Ascobolus albidus live as decomposers on the feces of large herbivore and omnivore mammals and depend on their survival, due to the specialized habitat they inhabit.

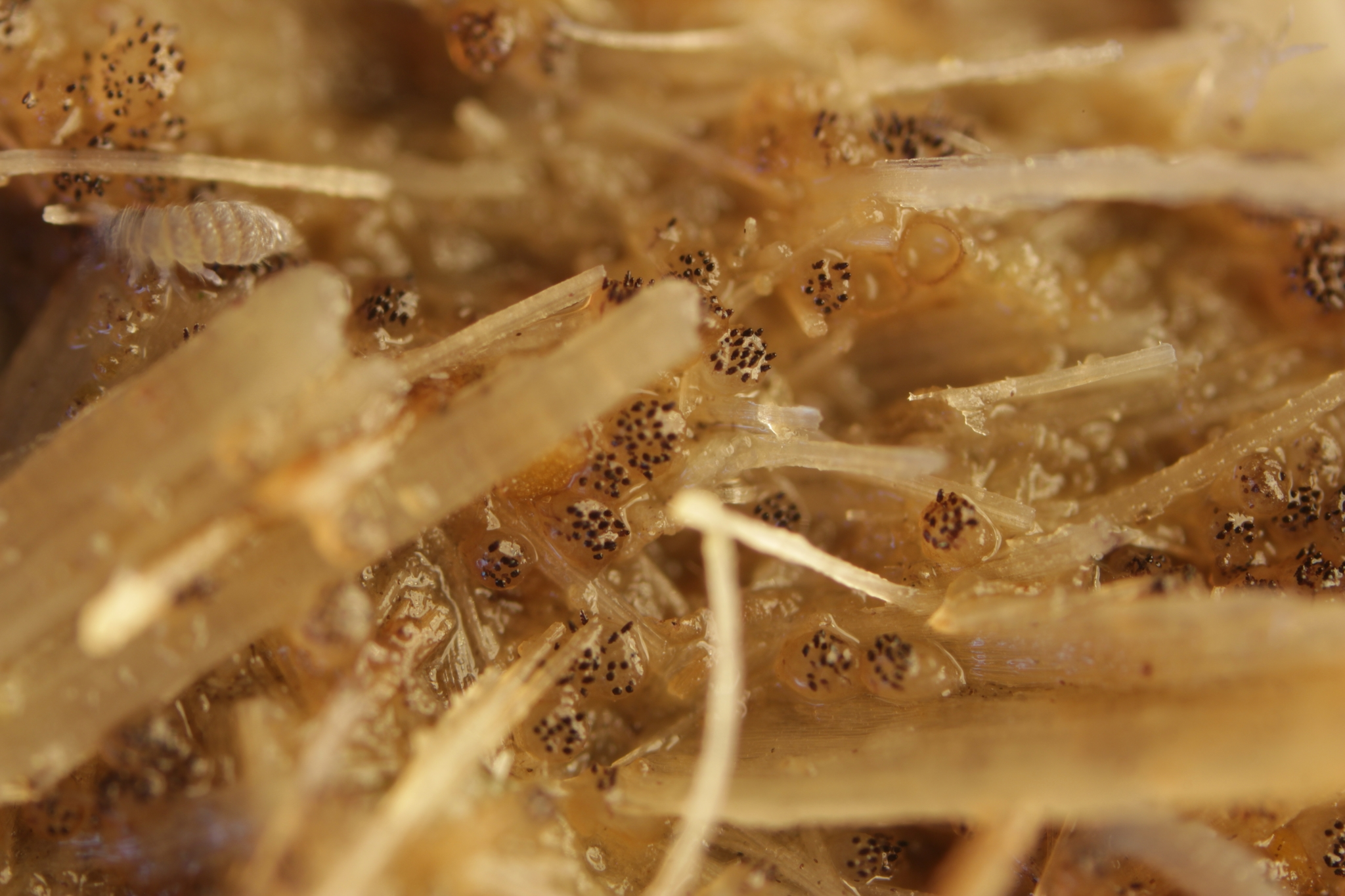
Weißlicher Kotling Ascobolus albidus, Northern Velebit National Park

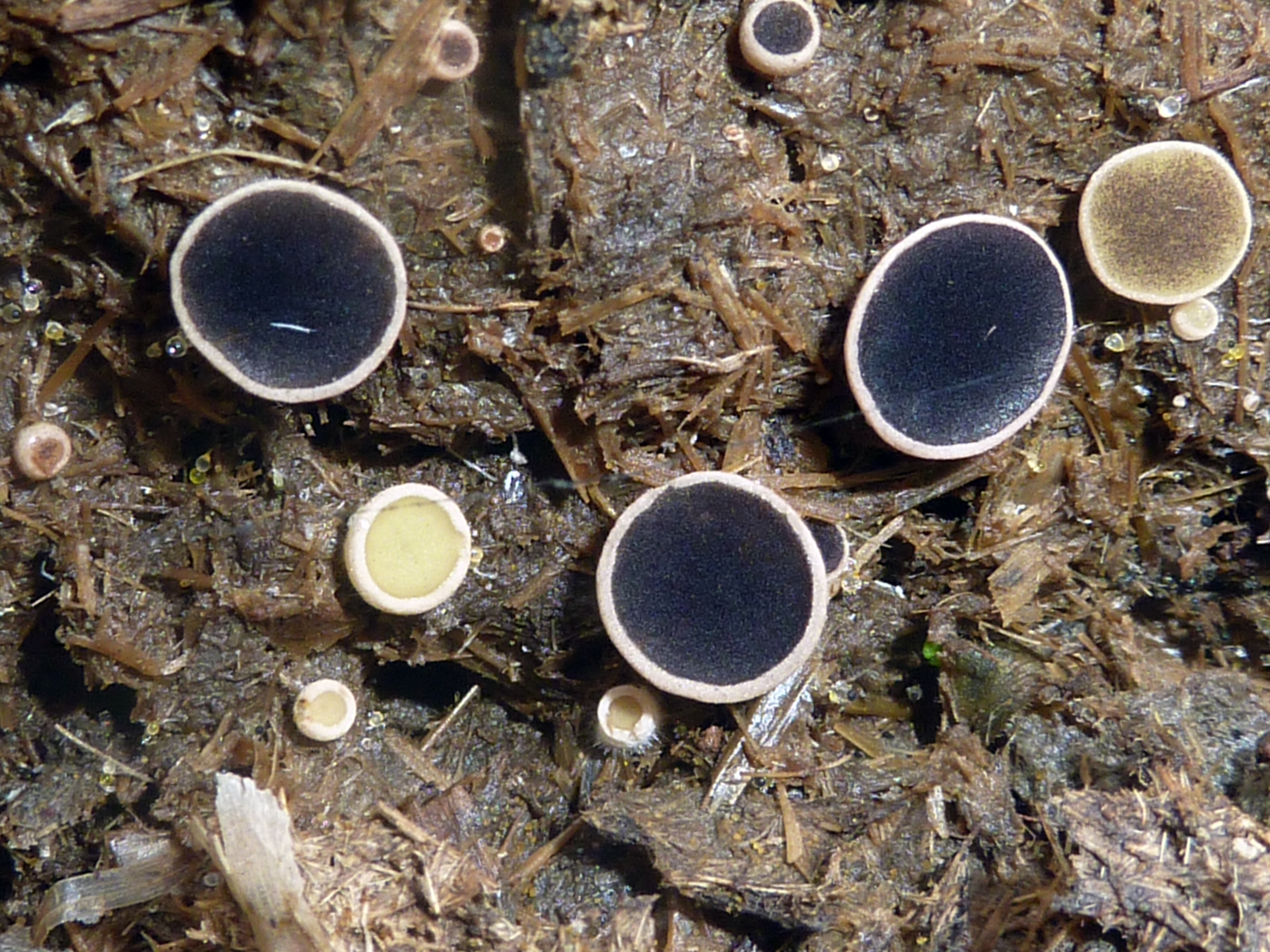
Ascobolus scatigenus

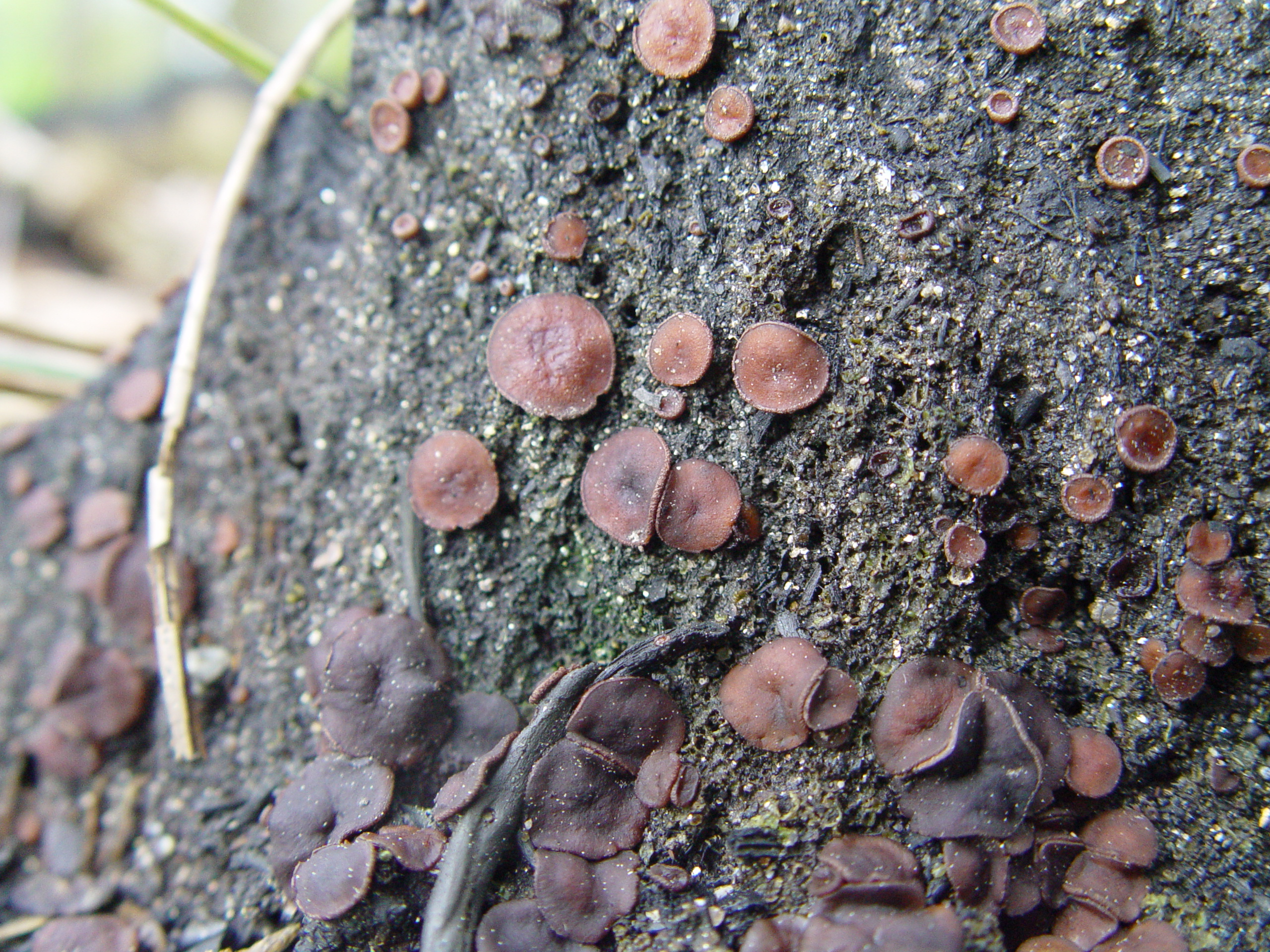
Ascobolus carbonarius dwells on burnt material

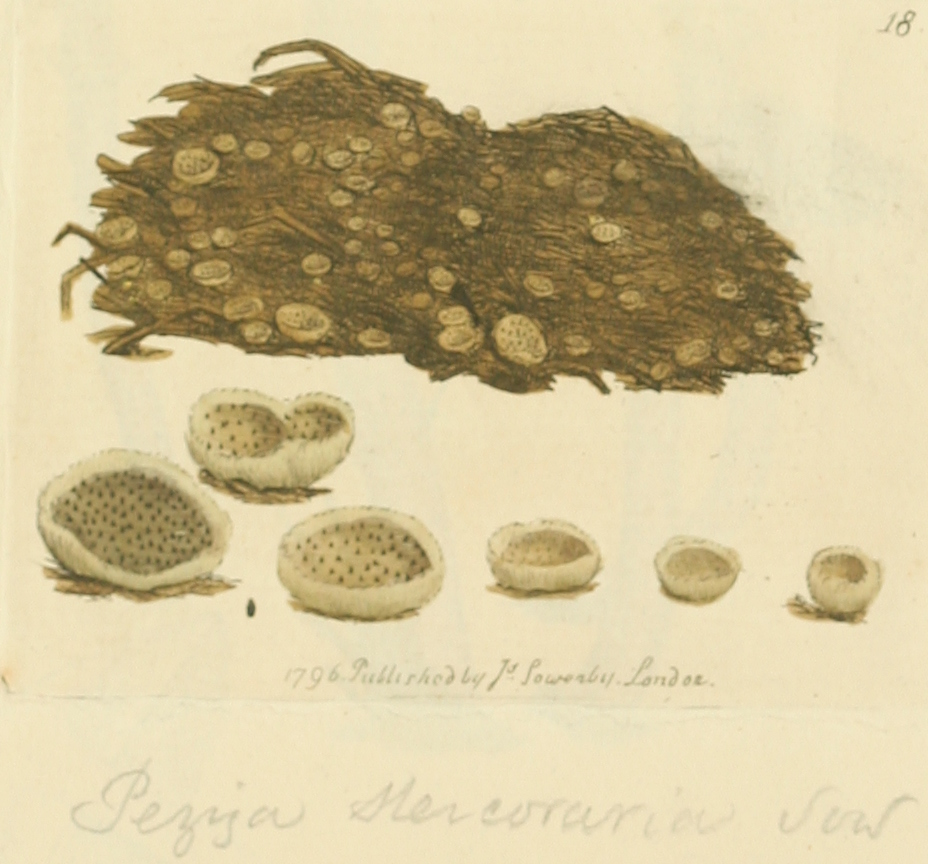
Ascobolus stercorarius:James Sowerbys Coloured Figures of English Fungi or Mushrooms

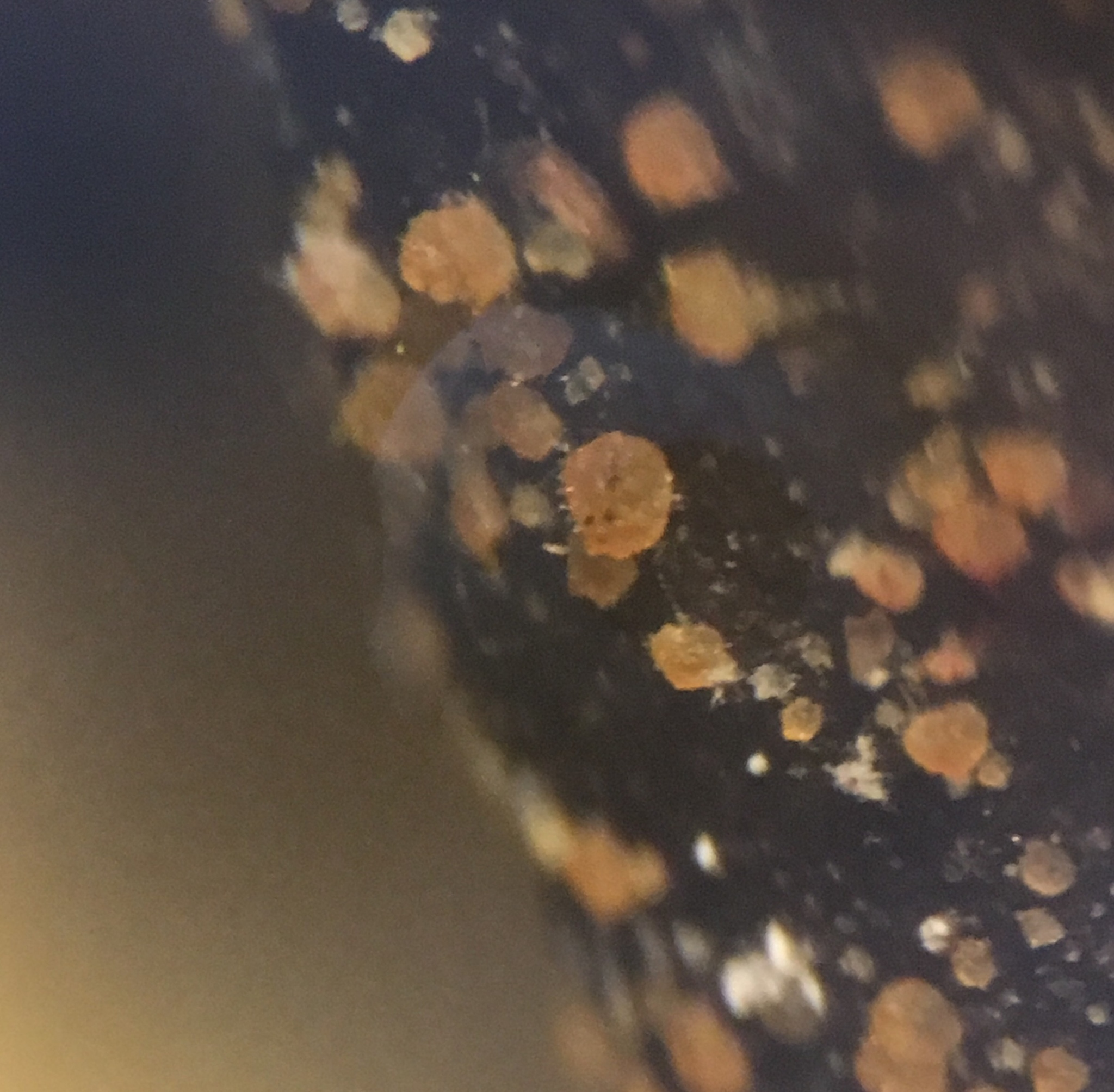
Saccobolus citrinus

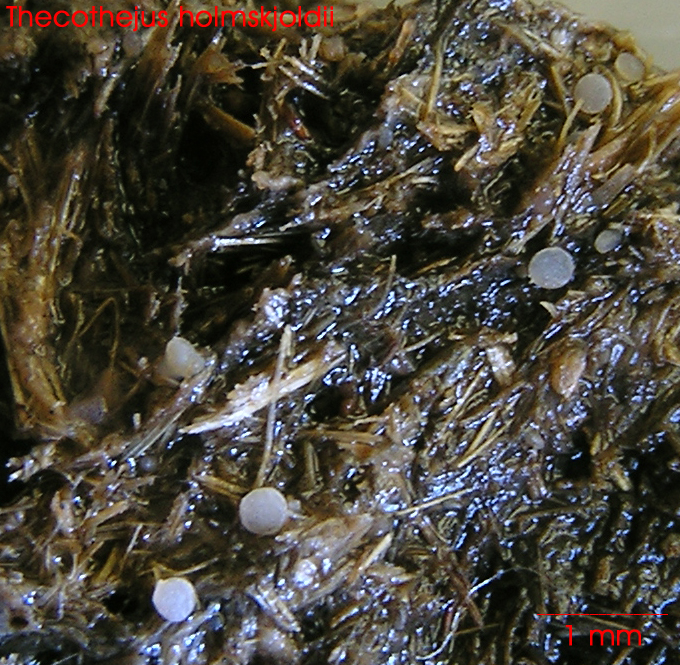
Thecotheus holmskioldii
