= Plant disease =

Diseases of plants

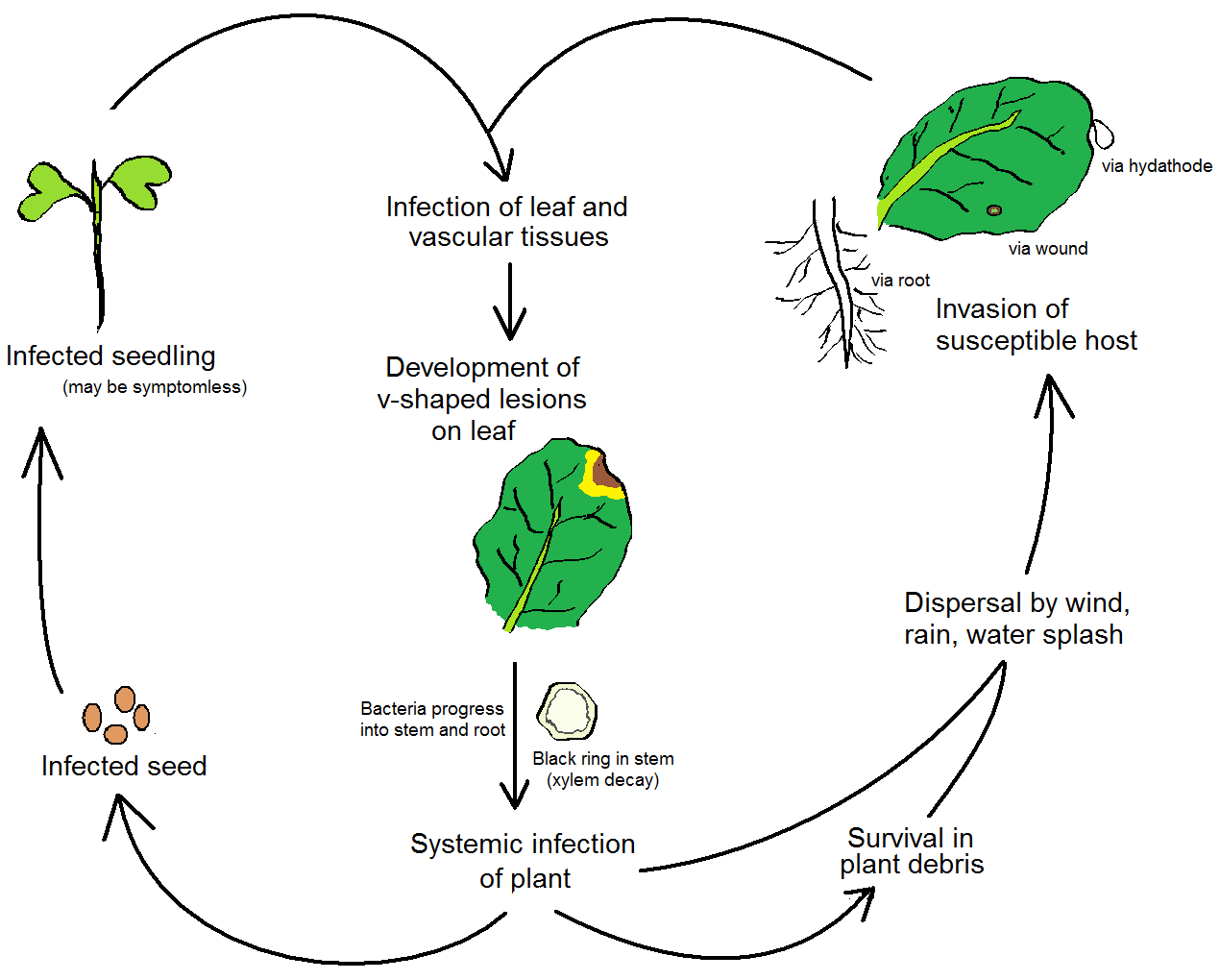
Life cycle of the black rot pathogen, the gram negative bacterium Xanthomonas campestris pathovar campestris

Plant diseases are diseases in plants caused by pathogens (infectious organisms) and environmental conditions (physiological factors). Organisms that cause infectious disease include fungi, oomycetes, bacteria, viruses, viroids, virus-like organisms, phytoplasmas, protozoa, nematodes and parasitic plants. Not included are ectoparasites like insects, mites, vertebrates, or other pests that affect plant health by eating plant tissues and causing injury that may admit plant pathogens. The study of plant disease is called plant pathology.

== Plant pathogens ==
=== Fungi ===
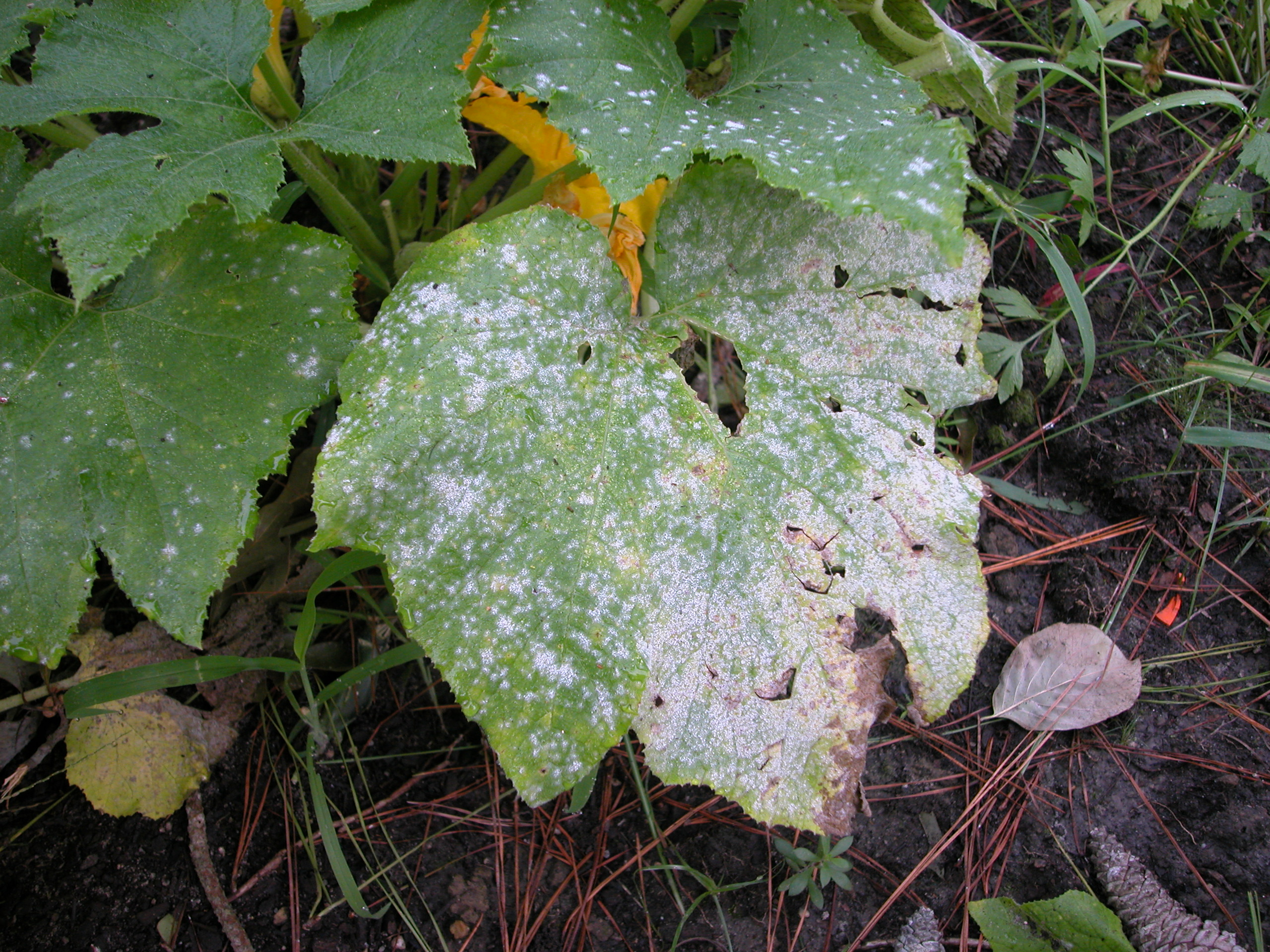
Powdery mildew, a biotrophic Ascomycete fungus

Most phytopathogenic fungi are Ascomycetes or Basidiomycetes. They reproduce both sexually and asexually via the production of spores and other structures. Spores may be spread long distances by air or water, or they may be soil borne. Many soil inhabiting fungi are capable of living saprotrophically, carrying out the role of their life cycle in the soil. These are facultative saprotrophs.

Fungal diseases may be controlled through the use of fungicides and other agricultural practices. However, new races of fungi often evolve that are resistant to various fungicides.

Biotrophic fungal pathogens colonize living plant tissue and obtain nutrients from living host cells. Necrotrophic fungal pathogens infect and kill host tissue and extract nutrients from the dead host cells.

Significant fungal plant pathogens include:

==== Ascomycetes ====
- Fusarium spp. (Fusarium wilt disease)
- Magnaporthe grisea (rice blast)
- Rhizosphaera needle cast (e.g. in spruce)
- Sclerotinia sclerotiorum (cottony rot)
- Thielaviopsis spp. (canker rot, black root rot, Thielaviopsis root rot)
- Verticillium spp. (Verticillium wilt of dicots)

==== Basidiomycetes ====
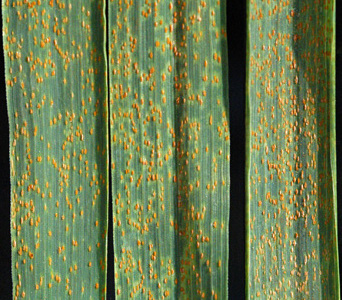
Wheat leaf rust caused by the Basidiomycete Puccinia tricicina

- Ustilago spp. (smuts)
- Rhizoctonia spp.
- Phakospora pachyrhizi (soybean rust)
- Puccinia spp. (severe rusts of cereals and grasses)(fungus)|rusts]].
- Armillaria spp. (honey fungus species, virulent pathogens of trees)

=== Fungus-like organisms ===
==== Oomycetes ====
The oomycetes are fungus-like organisms among the Stramenopiles. They include some of the most destructive plant pathogens, such as the causal agents of potato late blight root rot, and sudden oak death.

Despite not being closely related to the Fungi, the oomycetes have developed similar infection strategies, using effector proteins to turn off a plant's defenses.

==== Phytomyxea ====
Some Phytomyxea cause important diseases, including clubroot in cabbage and its relatives and powdery scab in potatoes. These are caused by species of Plasmodiophora and Spongospora, respectively.

=== Bacteria ===
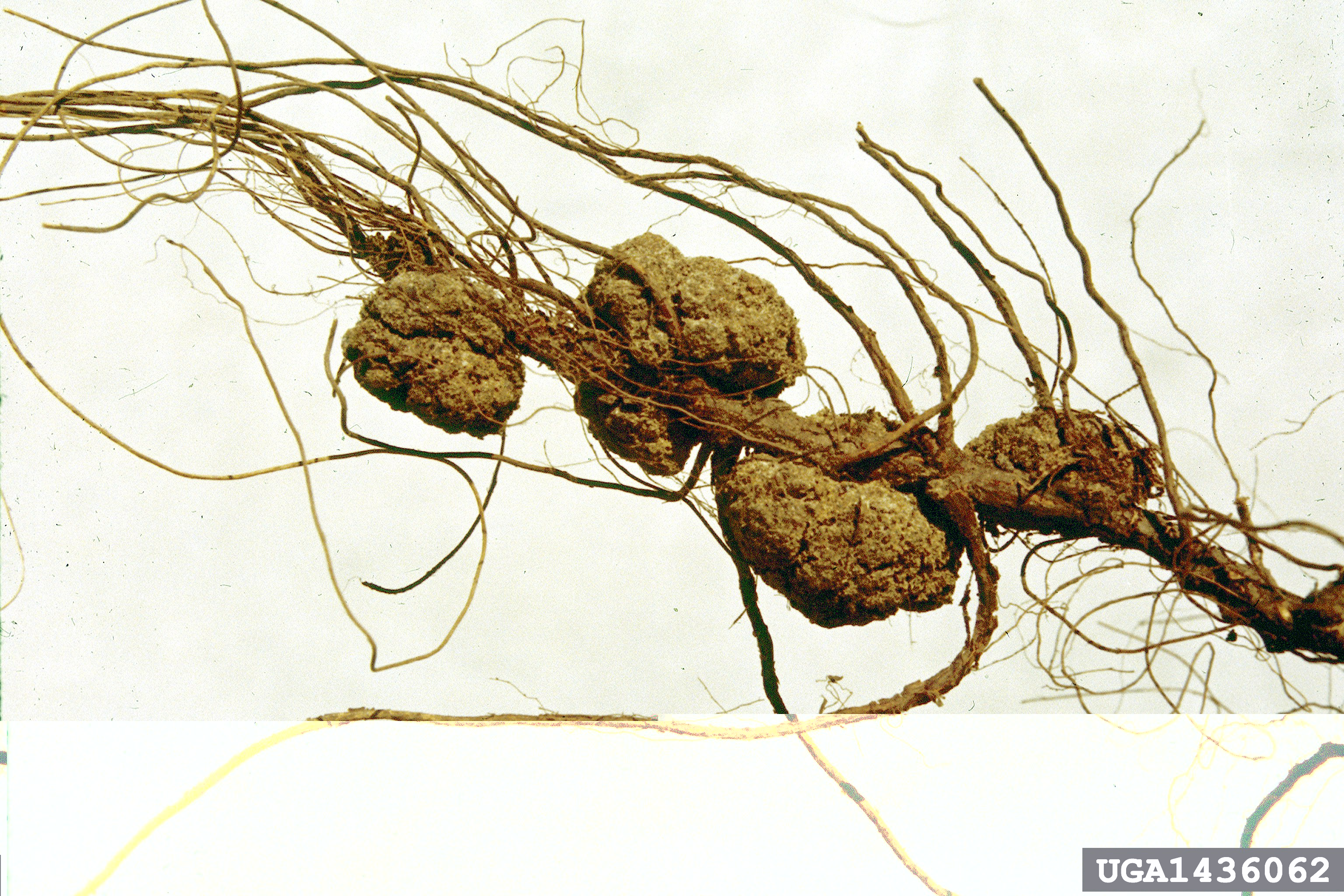
Crown gall disease caused by Agrobacterium

==== Pathogenic bacteria ====
Most bacteria associated with plants are saprotrophic and do no harm to the plant itself. However, a small number, around 100 known species, cause disease, especially in subtropical and tropical regions of the world.

Most plant pathogenic bacteria are bacilli. Erwinia uses cell wall–degrading enzymes to cause soft rot. Agrobacterium changes the level of auxins to cause tumours with phytohormones.

Bacterial plant pathogens include:

- Burkholderia
- Pseudomonadota
  - Xanthomonas spp.
  - Pseudomonas spp.
- Pseudomonas syringae pv. tomato causes tomato plants to produce less fruit, and it "continues to adapt to the tomato by minimizing its recognition by the tomato immune system."

==== Mollicutes ====
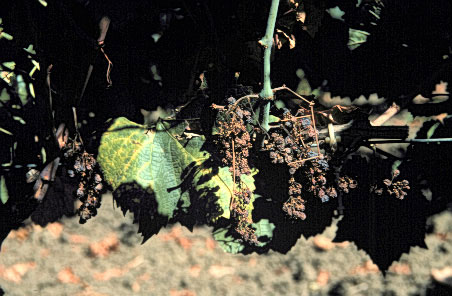
Vitis vinifera with "Ca. Phytoplasma vitis" infection

Phytoplasma and Spiroplasma are obligate intracellular parasites, bacteria that lack cell walls and, like the mycoplasmas, which are human pathogens, they belong to the class Mollicutes. Their cells are extremely small, 1 to 2 micrometres across. They tend to have small genomes (roughly between 0.5 and 2 Mb). They are normally transmitted by leafhoppers (cicadellids) and psyllids, both sap-sucking insect vectors. These inject the bacteria into the plant's phloem, where it reproduces.

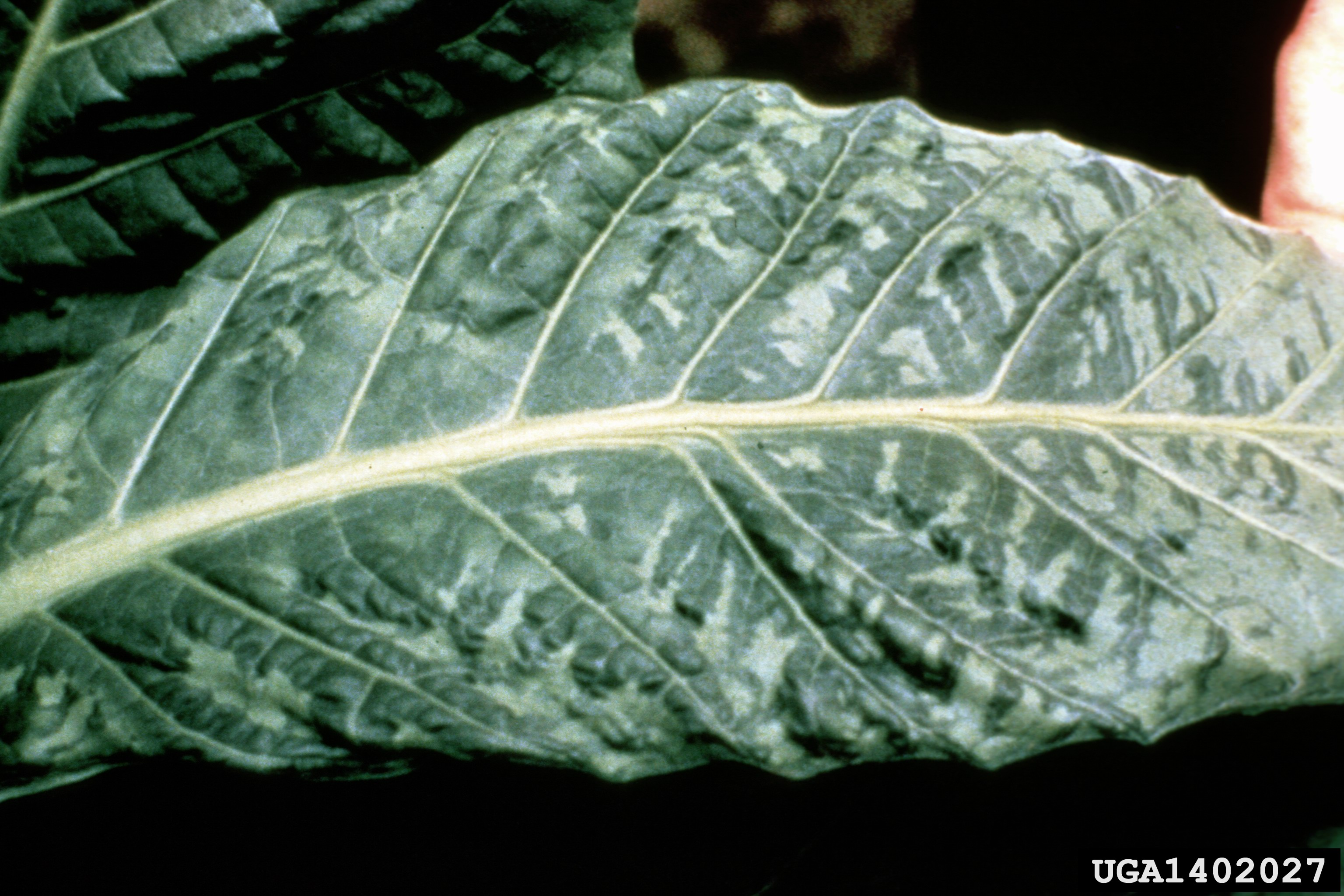
Tobacco mosaic virus

=== Viruses ===
Many plant viruses cause only a loss of crop yield. Therefore, it is not economically viable to try to control them, except when they infect perennial species, such as fruit trees.

Most plant viruses have small, single-stranded RNA genomes. Some also have double stranded RNA or single or double stranded DNA. These may encode only three or four proteins: a replicase, a coat protein, a movement protein to facilitate cell to cell movement through plasmodesmata, and sometimes a protein that allows transmission by a vector.

Plant viruses are generally transmitted by a vector, but mechanical and seed transmission also occur. Vectors are often insects such as aphids; others are fungi, nematodes, and protozoa. In many cases, the insect and virus are specific for virus transmission such as the beet leafhopper that transmits the curly top virus causing disease in several crop plants.

=== Nematodes ===
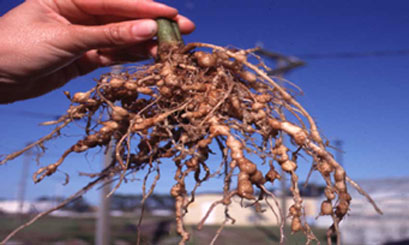
Root-knot nematode galls

Some nematodes parasitize plant roots. They are a problem in tropical and subtropical regions. Potato cyst nematodes (Globodera pallida and G. rostochiensis) are widely distributed in Europe and the Americas, causing $300 million worth of damage in Europe annually. Root knot nematodes have quite a large host range, they parasitize plant root systems and thus directly affect the uptake of water and nutrients needed for normal plant growth and reproduction, whereas cyst nematodes tend to be able to infect only a few species. Nematodes are able to cause radical changes in root cells in order to facilitate their lifestyle.

=== Protozoa ===
A few plant diseases are caused by protozoa such as Phytomonas, a kinetoplastid. They are transmitted as durable zoospores that may be able to survive in a resting state in the soil for many years. Further, they can transmit plant viruses. When the motile zoospores come into contact with a root hair they produce a plasmodium which invades the roots.

== Physiological plant disorders ==
Some abiotic disorders can be confused with pathogen-induced disorders. Abiotic causes include natural processes such as drought, frost, snow and hail; flooding and poor drainage; nutrient deficiency; deposition of mineral salts such as sodium chloride and gypsum; windburn and breakage by storms; and wildfires.

== Economic impact ==
Plant diseases cause major economic losses for farmers worldwide. Across large regions and many crop species, it is estimated that diseases typically reduce plant yields by 10% every year in more developed settings, but yield loss to diseases often exceeds 20% in less developed settings. The Food and Agriculture Organization estimates that pests and diseases are responsible for about 25% of crop loss. To solve this, new methods are needed to detect diseases and pests early, such as novel sensors that detect plant odours and spectroscopy and biophotonics that are able to diagnose plant health and metabolism.

As of 2018 the most costly diseases of the most produced crops worldwide are:

| Crop | Disease Latin name | Disease common name |
|---|---|---|
| Banana and plantain | banana bunchy top virus (BBTV) | banana bunchy top |
| Banana and plantain | Mycosphaerella fijiensis | black sigatoka |
| Banana and plantain | Fusarium oxysporum f.sp. cubense | Panama disease |
| Barley | Fusarium graminearum | Fusarium head blight |
| Barley | Blumeria hordei (=Blumeria graminis f. sp. hordei) | powdery mildew |
| Barley | Puccinia hordei (=Puccinia graminis f. sp. hordei) | barley stem rust |
| Cassava | African cassava mosaic virus (ACMVD) | African cassava mosaic disease |
| Cassava | Xanthomonas axonopodis pv. manihotis | bacterial blight |
| Cassava | cassava brown streak virus (CBSV) | cassava brown streak disease |
| Cotton | Xanthomonas citri pv. malvacearum | bacterial blight |
| Cotton | Fusarium oxysporum f. sp. vasinfectum | Fusarium wilt |
| Cotton | Verticillium dahliae | Verticillium wilt |
| Maize/corn | Aspergillus flavus | Aspergillus ear rot |
| Maize/corn | Fusarium graminearum | Giberella stalk and ear rot |
| Maize/corn | Cercospora zeae-maydis | grey leaf spot |
| Palm fruit | Ganoderma orbiforme/Ganoderma boninense | Basal stem rot |
| Palm fruit | Phytophthora palmivora | bud rot |
| Peanut | groundnut rosette virus (GNV) | Groundnut rosette disease |
| Peanut | GNV satellite RNA | Groundnut rosette disease |
| Peanut | groundnut rosette assistor virus (GRAV) | Groundnut rosette disease |
| Potato | Ralstonia solanacearum | Potato brown rot |
| Potato | Phytophthora infestans | late blight |
| Rapeseed and mustard | Leptosphaeria maculans | Phoma stem canker |
| Rapeseed and mustard | Sclerotinia sclerotiorum | Sclerotinia stem rot |
| Rice | Magnaporthe oryzae | rice blast |
| Rice | Xanthomonas oryzae pv. oryzae | rice bacterial blight |
| Rice | Rhizoctonia solani | sheath blight |
| Sorghum and millet | Colletotrichum sublineolum | Anthracnose |
| Sorghum and millet | Exserohilum turcicum | Turcicum leaf blight |
| Soybean | Heterodera glycines | soybean cyst nematode disease |
| Soybean | Phakopsora pachyrhizi | Asian soybean rust |
| Sugar beet | Cercospora beticola | Cercospora leaf spot |
| Sugar beet | beet necrotic yellow vein virus (BNYVV) | rhizomania |
| Sugarcane | Leifsonia xyli subsp. xyli | Ratoon stunting |
| Sugarcane | Colletotrichum falcatum | red rot |
| Sweet potato | sweet potato feathery mottle virus (SPFMV) | sweet potato virus disease (SPVD) |
| Sweet potato | sweet potato chlorotic stunt virus (SPCSV) | sweet potato virus disease (SPVD) |
| Tomato | Phytophthora infestans | late blight |
| Tomato | tomato yellow leaf curl virus (TYLCV) | tomato yellow leaf curl |
| Wheat | Fusarium graminearum | Fusarium head blight |
| Wheat | Puccinia graminis | wheat stem rust |
| Wheat | Puccinia striiformis | wheat yellow rust |
| Yam | Colletotrichum gloeosporioides | anthracnose |
| Yam | yam mosaic virus (YMV) | yam mosaic disease |

== Control measures ==
Given the economic harm that plant disease can cause, countries may attempt to mitigate harms with border controls and other measures.

=== Port and border inspection and quarantine ===
The introduction of harmful non native organisms into a country can be reduced by controlling human traffic (e.g., the Australian Quarantine and Inspection Service). Global trade provides unprecedented opportunities for the introduction of plant pests. (Note: p. 17, "It is clear, however, that continuing increases in global trade and travel will provide opportunities for non indigenous species to be transported into the U.S. at rates that are unprecedented in world history.") In the United States, even to get a better estimate of the number of such introductions would require a substantial increase in inspections. (Note: p. 17, " A more comprehensive estimate of the frequency and diversity of non indigenous plants, particularly those introduced as contaminants in cargo, would likely require a substantial increase in inspection efforts by APHIS personnel.") In Australia a similar shortcoming of understanding has a different origin: Port inspections are not very useful because inspectors know too little about taxonomy. There are often pests that the Australian Government has prioritised as harmful to be kept out of the country, but which have near taxonomic relatives that confuse the issue. (Note: p. 39, Table 2)

X-ray and electron-beam/E-beam irradiation of food has been trialed as a quarantine treatment for fruit commodities originating from Hawaii. The US FDA (Food and Drug Administration), USDA APHIS (Animal and Plant Health Inspection Service), producers, and consumers were all accepting of the results - more thorough pest eradication and lesser taste degradation than heat treatment.

The International Plant Protection Convention (IPPC) anticipates that molecular diagnostics for inspections will continue to improve. Between 2020 and 2030, IPPC expects continued technological improvement to lower costs and improve performance, albeit not for less developed countries unless funding changes.

=== Chemical ===
Many natural and synthetic compounds can be employed to combat plant diseases. This method works by directly eliminating disease-causing organisms or curbing their spread; however, it has been shown to have too broad an effect, typically, to be good for the local ecosystem. From an economic standpoint, all but the simplest natural additives may disqualify a product from "organic" status, potentially reducing the value of the yield.

=== Biological ===
Crop rotation is a traditional and sometimes effective means of preventing pests and diseases from becoming well-established, alongside other benefits.

Other biological methods include inoculation. Protection against infection by Agrobacterium tumefaciens, which causes gall diseases in many plants, can be provided by dipping cuttings in suspensions of Agrobacterium radiobacter before inserting them in the ground to take root.

== See also ==
- Burl or Burr
- Common names of plant diseases
- Plant disease forecasting
- Stunting
