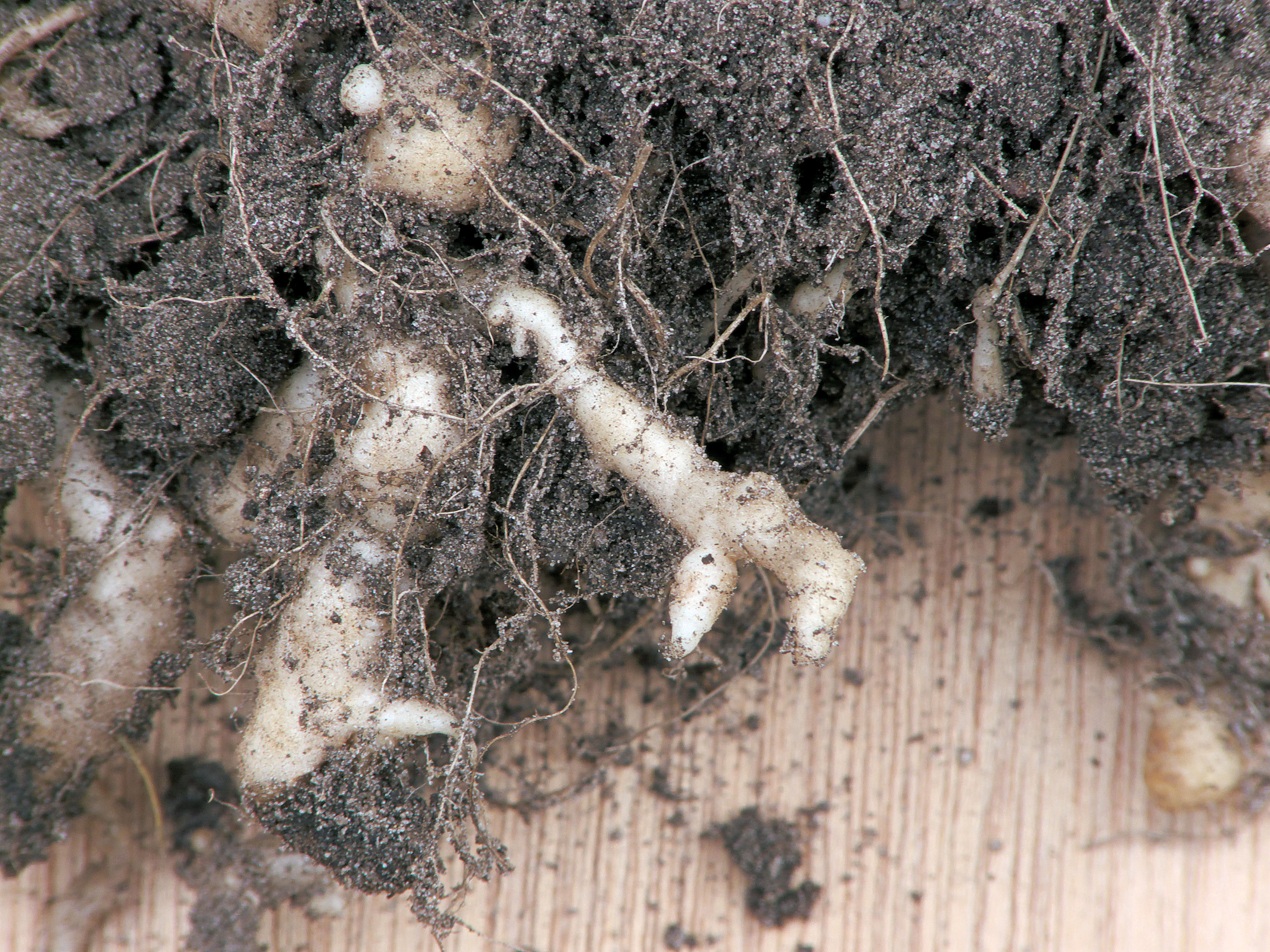

Scientific classification
- Domain: Eukaryota
- Supergroup: Rhizaria
- Phylum: Cercozoa
- Subphylum: Endomyxa
- Class: Phytomyxea
- Order: Plasmodiophorida
- Family: Plasmodiophoridae
- Genus: Plasmodiophora
- Species: P. brassicae

Binomial name
- Plasmodiophora brassicae Woronin

= Plasmodiophora brassicae =

Species of single-celled soilborne organism

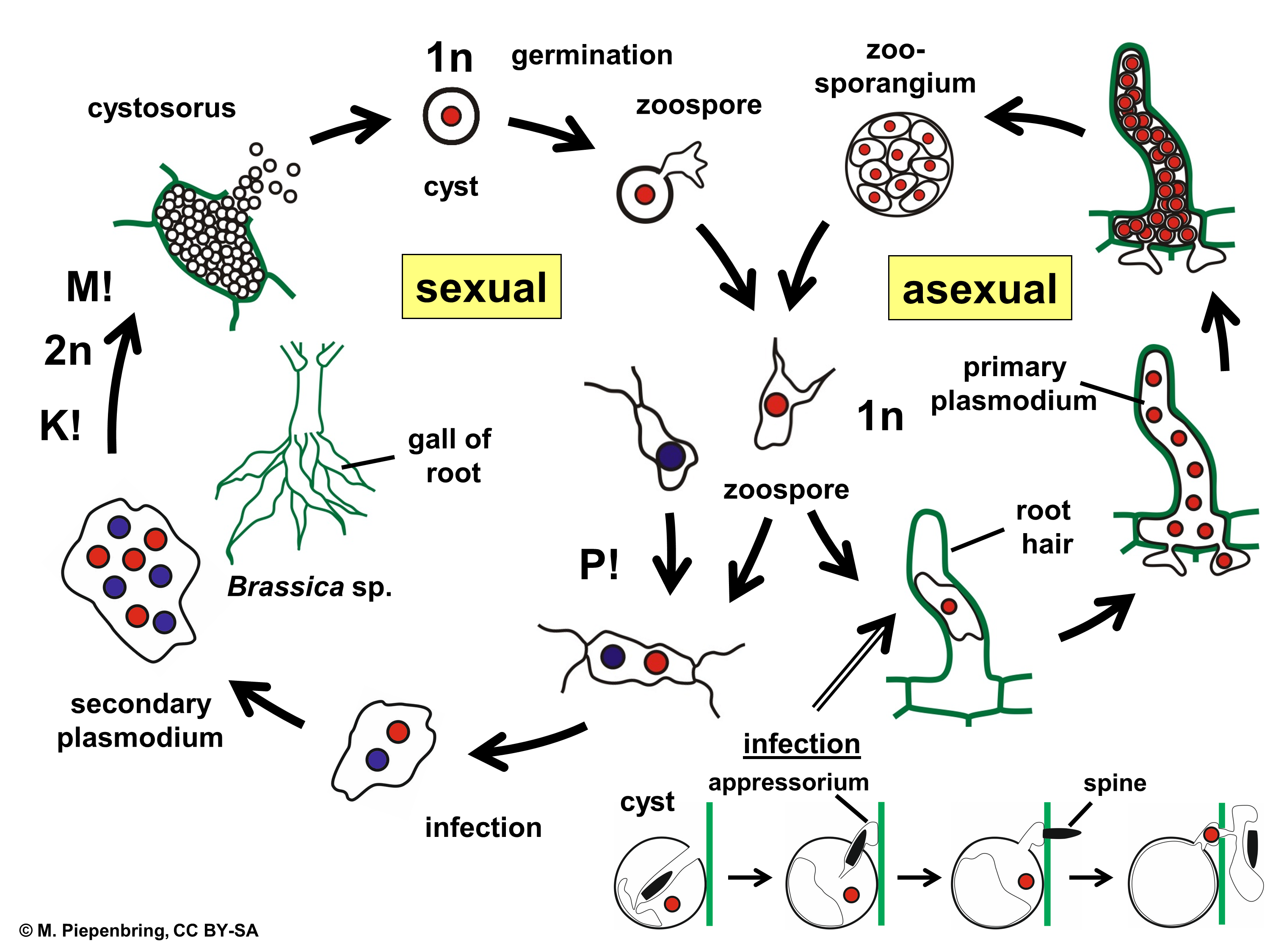
Life cycle of P. brassicae

Plasmodiophora brassicae is a soilborne organism that is best known for its high economic impact on Brassica oil and vegetable crops. It infects 30 different cruciferous plants, which consists of up to 16 crop species, 9 ornamentals, and 5 weeds. The fungus-like organisms on those plants causes a disease referred to as clubroot.

== Taxonomy ==
Plasmodiophora brassicae was once referred to as a slime mold but was then transferred to the Phytomyxea group.

== Description ==
Plasmodiophora brassicae exhibits two main forms within its life cycle. It is either a spore that is ready to infect roots or it becomes a persistent spore in the soil. That, or the fungus can become a somewhat mobile zoospore, which is a spindle shaped biflagellate cell.

== Life cycle ==
Plasmodiophora brassicae life cycle consists of two main phases. Phase one is a sporangial stage which will lead to a short-lived zoospore. Stage two leads to a sporogenic phase which creates persistent resting spores. Within the two phases P. brassicae has three distinct stages within its lifecycle. Starting with survival within the soil, from there it will find a host and infect the root hairs of the plant, and finally it will start the cortical infection.

== Habitat and distribution ==
It was first discovered in Europe in the 13th century and has since traveled across the globe. It has been reported in over sixty countries. including countries such as China, United States, and most other major countries. It survives in the soil around its target host while also being found in particular waterways, which most likely came from runoff of fields and soil that has already been infected with club root.

== Affected crops ==
P. brassicae can, as well as crops, also infect ornamental flowers and weeds, though the primary focus of investigation of the organism has been on its effects on crops that have had the most detrimental effect to humans and other species. It has been found to infect most consequentially many crops that we use as a main food source, including cabbage, brussels sprouts, turnips, broccoli, mustard, and radishes, but the pathogen has the ability to disturb almost all cruciferous species.

== Symptoms ==
Symptoms of P. brassicae are the swelling of the roots which cause "clubs". These clubs can be found on primary roots, secondary roots, tap roots, and even the area of the stalk just under ground level. Larger clubs are formed on larger roots especially just under the surface of the soil.

== Control ==
Controlling P. brassicae can be quite difficult. There are two main ways to help control this organism. The first way would be cultural control and the other is chemical control. Within cultural control the objective is to keep the fungi under control so that it does not affect the farmers' profit. Do this by removing the fungus' favorable conditions which are excessive moisture in the soil, temperatures ranging from 18 to 25 degrees Celsius, and low pH in the soil. Good draining soil while also raising the pH of the soil by adding lime powder are good non-chemical ways to control P. brassicae. Within chemicals there are soil sterilants and Fungicides that can be sprayed into the fields of affected soils.
