= Ligniera pilorum =

Scientific classification
- Domain: Eukaryota
- Supergroup: Rhizaria
- Phylum: Cercozoa
- Subphylum: Endomyxa
- Class: Phytomyxea
- Order: Plasmodiophorida
- Family: Plasmodiophoridae
- Genus: Ligniera
- Species: L. pilorum

Binomial name
- Ligniera pilorum Fron & Gaillat (1925)

Species of single-celled organism

Ligniera pilorum is a plant pathogen infecting wheat.
