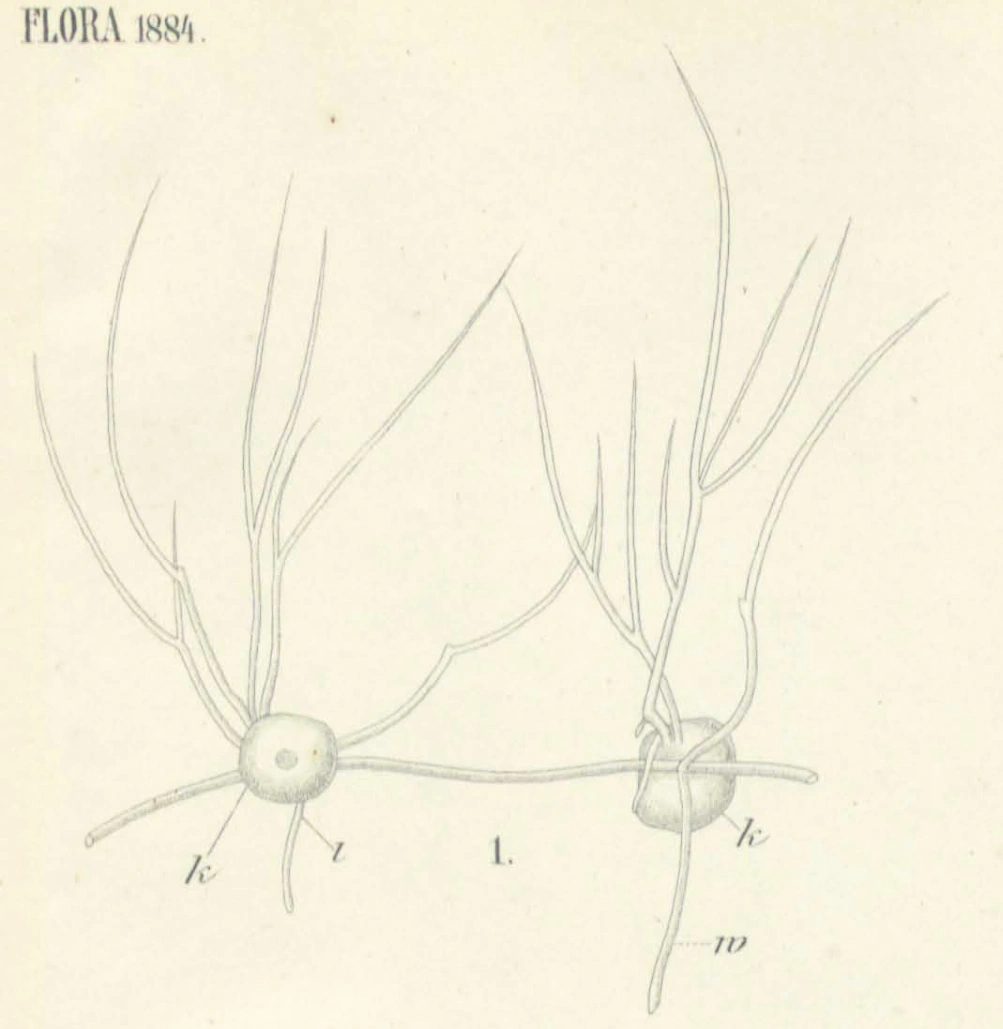
- T. parasitica in Ruppia tubers

Scientific classification
- Domain: Eukaryota
- Clade: Sar
- Clade: Rhizaria
- Phylum: Endomyxa
- Class: Phytomyxea
- Order: Plasmodiophorales
- Family: Plasmodiophoridae
- Genus: Tetramyxa
- Species: T. parasitica

Binomial name
- Tetramyxa parasitica K.I. Goebel, 1884
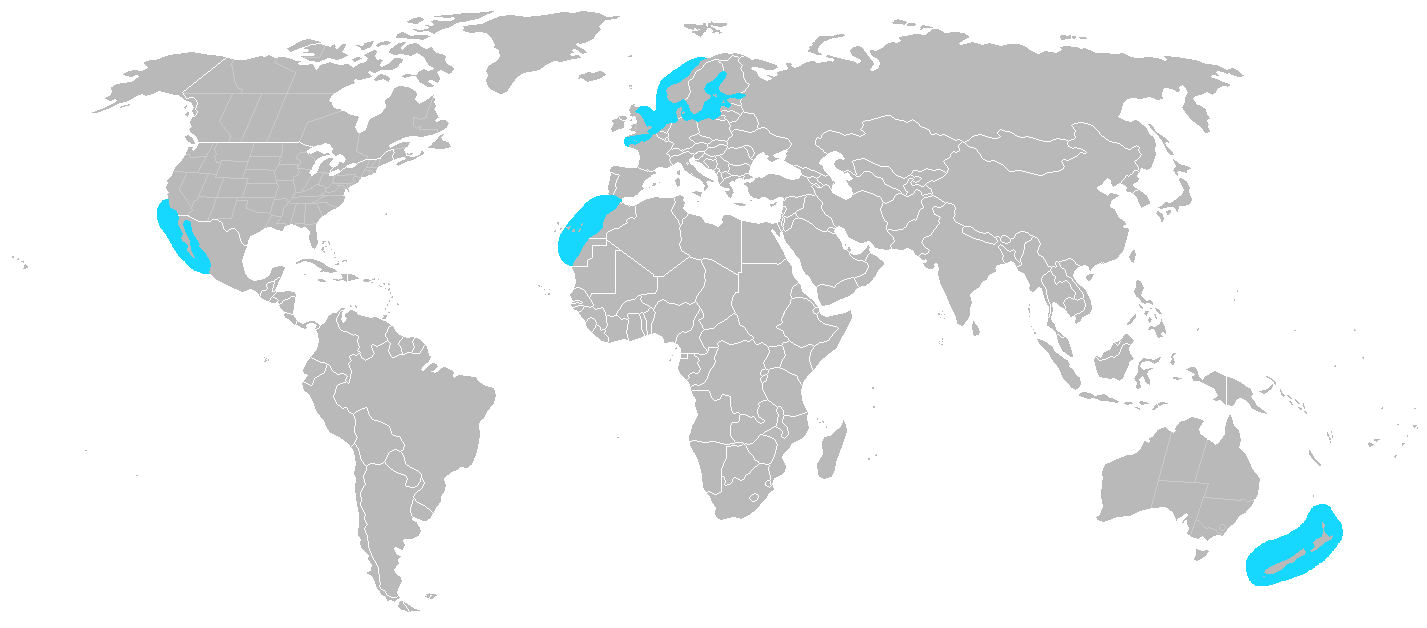
- T. parasitica marine distribution map.

= Tetramyxa parasitica =

Species of parasitic cercozoan

Tetramyxa parasitica is a species of parasitic cercozoan, member of the plasmodiophorids, that causes gall formation on multiple genera of aquatic plants. It was first discovered on roots of Ruppia and described by Karl von Goebel in 1884 in his work Flora, where it became the type species of the genus Tetramyxa.

== Ecology and pathology ==
T. parasitica is found in freshwater environments, brackish waters and estuaries. It is an obligate endoparasite of several species of the aquatic plants Ruppia (cirrhosa, rastellata, maritima, brachypus), Zannichellia (palustris, repens) and Potamogeton (pusillus, panormitanus, striatus, berteroanus).

When attacking a plant stem, the species generates galls that are roughly spherical in shape, with a diameter of 1-5 mm, and with color ranging from light cream and green (during the phase of sporogenic development where small plasmodia become mature resting spores) to dark brown (after the resting spores reach maturity).

Due to the pressure generated by the growth of the parasite at the largest galls, the epidermis and pseudoepidermis appear as 1-3 layers of flattened cells with no differentiated cuticle, this way preventing the gall from being easily damaged. The aerenchyma tissue suffers from hyperplasia, due to the hypertrophy of its cells, losing the air pockets and becoming a compact tissue with no defined characteristics. The surrounding cells accumulate big quantities of starch granules of up to 12 μm. However, even in the most advanced growth stages, the vascular tissue seems unaffected.
