= Plasmodiophora bicaudata =

Scientific classification
- Domain: Eukaryota
- Clade: Sar
- Clade: Rhizaria
- Phylum: Endomyxa
- Class: Phytomyxea
- Order: Plasmodiophorida
- Family: Plasmodiophoridae
- Genus: Plasmodiophora
- Species: P. bicaudata

Binomial name
- Plasmodiophora bicaudata Feldmann, 1941
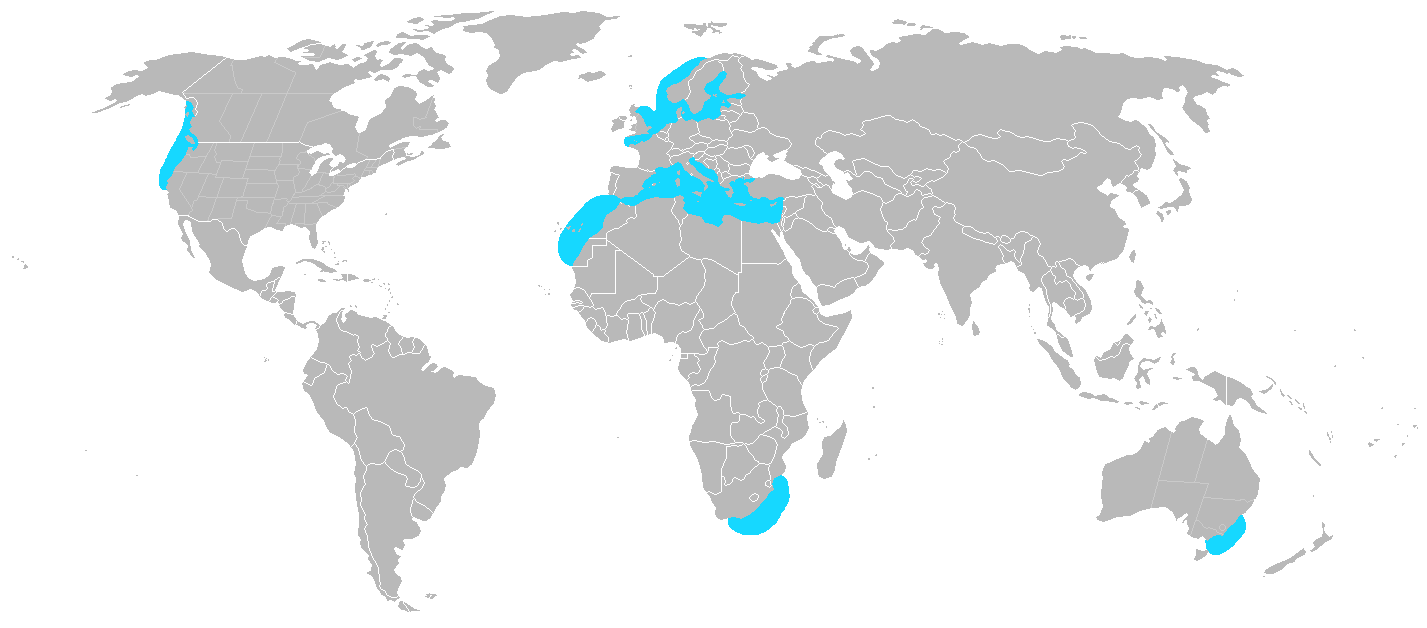
- P. bicaudata marine distribution map.

Parasitic species of protist affecting plants

Plasmodiophora bicaudata is a marine pathogen, an obligate parasite of seagrass of the genus Zostera and the causal agent of wasting disease in the genus. These marine plants grow in fine sediment in shallow seas and the pathogen seems to have a worldwide distribution.

== Biology ==
The life cycle of Plasmodiophora bicaudata is complex. It includes resting spores which can lie dormant, awaiting suitable conditions to infect a new plant. Its other forms include two types of plasmodia, the feeding stage that derive their energy from the host cells, and two types of zoospores. The motile zoospores are the only form that can move outside the host cells. They have whiplash flagella and can swim to reach new seagrass plants and can also crawl on the surface of the leaves in an amoeboid way by extending pseudopodia forward. This parasite causes galls to form in the internodes of the rhizomes of its host seagrasses, species of the genus Zostera. The condition is known as wasting disease, the nodes bunch up together and root development is poor so the plants are more easily uprooted in storms. Detached floating plants may spread the infection to new areas and when the seagrass has been planted for erosion control, the target seabed cover may not be achieved. The growth of leaves seems little affected by the parasite but flowering of the seagrass does not take place. The galls contain a large number of thick-walled, dormant spores 4-6 μm in diameter that are separate from one another. The infection of seagrasses by this parasite has been little studied but it is possible that it is a vector, able to transmit disease-causing viruses between plants as happens in some terrestrial species in this genus. This has not yet been observed in the marine environment.
