= Octave Lignier =

Élie Antoine Octave Lignier (25 February 1855, in Pougy – 19 March 1916, in Caen) was a French botanist, known for his work in the field of paleobotany.

From 1880 to 1887 he worked as assistant to Charles Eugène Bertrand at the University of Lille. He obtained his doctorate in sciences at Paris, and from 1887 gave lectures in botany at the University of Caen. In 1889 he received the title of professor, and from 1896 served as director of the botanical garden at Caen.

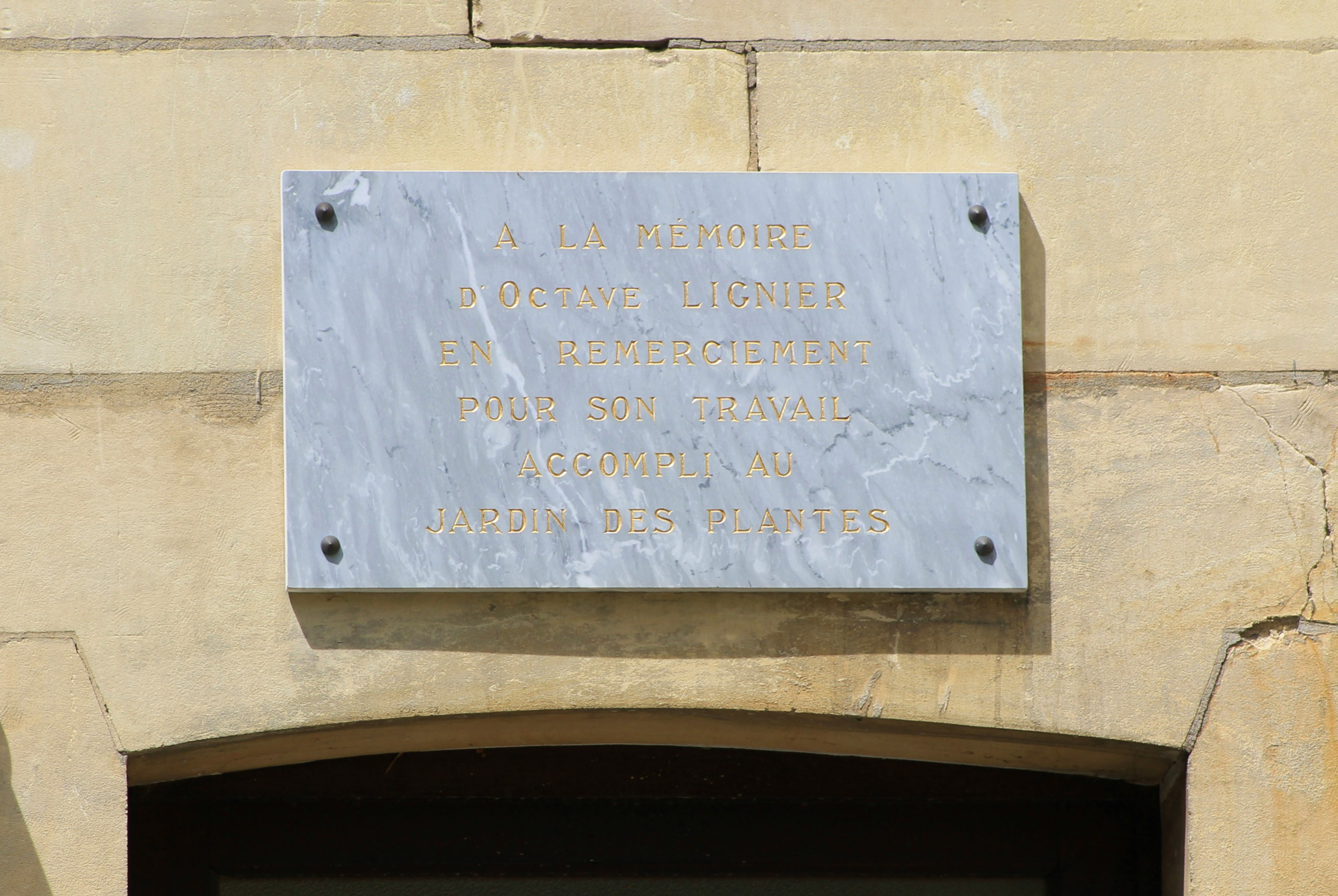
Memorial plaque dedicated to Lignier at the botanical institute in Caen

He is known for his pioneer research of what would become known as the "telome theory", a concept involving the evolutionary history of land plants. The fungus genera Ligniera (Maire & A.Tison, 1911; family Plasmodiophoraceae) and Lignieria (A.Chev.; family Melastomataceae, now a synonym of Dissotis Benth.), commemorate his name.

== Selected works ==
- La Graine et le fruit des Calycanthées, 1891 – The seed and the fruit of Calycanthaceae.
- Végétaux fossiles de Normandie (7 parts 1894–1913) – Fossil plants of Normandy.
- Essai sur l'évolution morphologique du Règne végétal, 1909 – Essay on the morphological evolution of the plant kingdom.
