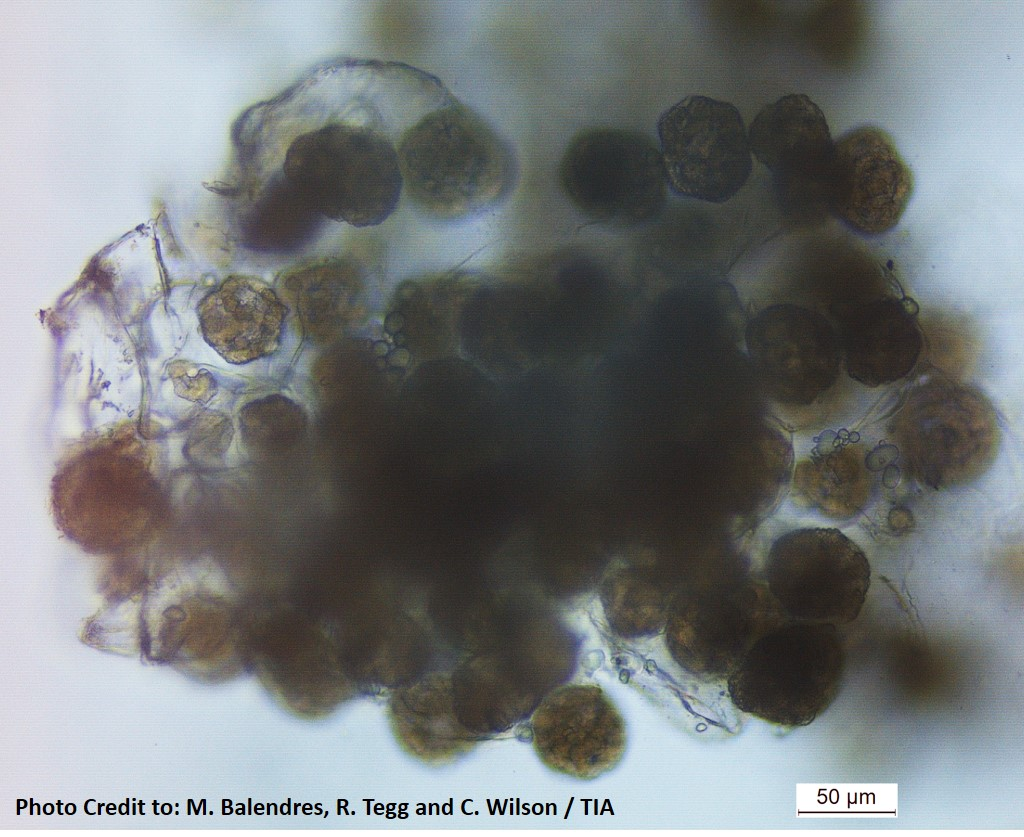
- Sporosori (survival structure) of the powdery scab pathogen

Scientific classification
- Domain: Eukaryota
- (unranked): SAR
- (unranked): Rhizaria
- Phylum: Cercozoa
- Class: Phytomyxea
- Order: Plasmodiophorida
- Family: Plasmodiophoraceae
- Genus: Spongospora
- Species: Spongospora subterranea

Trinomial name
- Spongospora subterranea f. sp. subterranea (Wallr.) Lagerh. 1892

= Powdery scab =

Disease of potatoes

Powdery scab is a disease of potato tubers. It is caused by the cercozoan Spongospora subterranea f. sp. subterranea and is widespread in potato growing countries. Symptoms of powdery scab include small lesions in the early stages of the disease, progressing to raised pustules containing a powdery mass. These can eventually rupture within the tuber periderm. The powdery pustules contain resting spores that release anisokont zoospores (asexual spore with two unequal length flagella) to infect the root hairs of potatoes or tomatoes. Powdery scab is a cosmetic defect on tubers, which can result in the rejection of these potatoes. Potatoes which have been infected can be peeled to remove the infected skin and the remaining inside of the potato can be cooked and eaten.

== Disease cycle ==
In general, not a lot is known about the life cycle of Spongospora subterranea f.sp subterranea (Sss). Most of the currently-proposed life cycle is based on that of Plasmodiophora brassicae, a closely related and better-studied protozoan. It has been proposed, due to this similarity, that there are two distinct stages that Sss can exist as; the asexual and sexual stages.

=== Asexual stage ===
A zoospore infects root tissue and becomes a uninucleate plasmodium. This plasmodium undergoes mitotic nuclear division (creates many nuclei within a single cell) and turns into a multinucleate plasmodium. Then, the multinucleate plasmodium forms zoosporangium, which eventually release more zoospores. This process can happen relatively quickly and can act as an important source of secondary inoculum within a field.

=== Sexual stage ===
This stage follows a similar pattern to the asexual stage, but with a few exceptions. It is hypothesized that two zoospores fuse together to form a dikaryotic zoospore (with two separate haploid nuclei, n+n) and then infect the roots. Once the infection occurs, the dikaryotic zoospore develops into a binucleate plasmodium (one pair on nuclei, n+n). Similar to the asexual stage, this plasmodium will also replicate its nucleus to create a multinucleate plasmodium (many pairs of nuclei, n+n). The second main different between stages occurs here. The pairs of nuclei (n+n) will fuse by karyogamy, and the plasmodium will quickly divide into numerous resting spores within a sporosori (spore sack, alternatively called cystosori). These resting spores have three-layered walls and are extremely resistant to the environment, allowing them to persist in the soil for longer than 10 years.

As a reminder, most of the life cycle is still unclear. However, the presence of zoospores, plasmodia, zoosporangia, and resting spores have been observed in the field and lab. The ploidy levels and karyogamy events are only theorized and have yet to be proven.

== Environment ==
Spongospora subterranea pathogenesis is most effective in cool, damp environments, such as northern Britain, the Columbia Basin of south-central Washington, and north-central Oregon. The environmental condition is particularly critical during the release of infective agents (zoospores) into the soil-environment. Upon release from resting spores, zoospores require moisture to swim towards the host tuber or roots. One study, found powdery scab was significantly more common on plants grown in constant dampness compared to plants grown with varying moisture levels. In this same study it was concluded that disease risk was related more to the environment, or moisture level, than the level of inoculum present. Inoculum may be present but not able to disperse due to environmental conditions, and therefore does not reach host tissue to infect. Other environmental factors that affect Spongospora subterranea infection are directly related to agronomic practices. Increased use of fertilizers containing nitrate or ammonium nitrogen increase the incidence and severity of powdery scab. It is thought that the fertilization increases root growth, and thus provides more tissue for infection and disease cycling to occur. Also, reduced cellulose within the cell walls caused by excess nitrogen may increase susceptibility of host to infection. It is apparent that the environment can directly affect both the host susceptibility and the dispersal of the pathogen ultimately setting the pace for the disease cycle.

== Pathogenesis ==
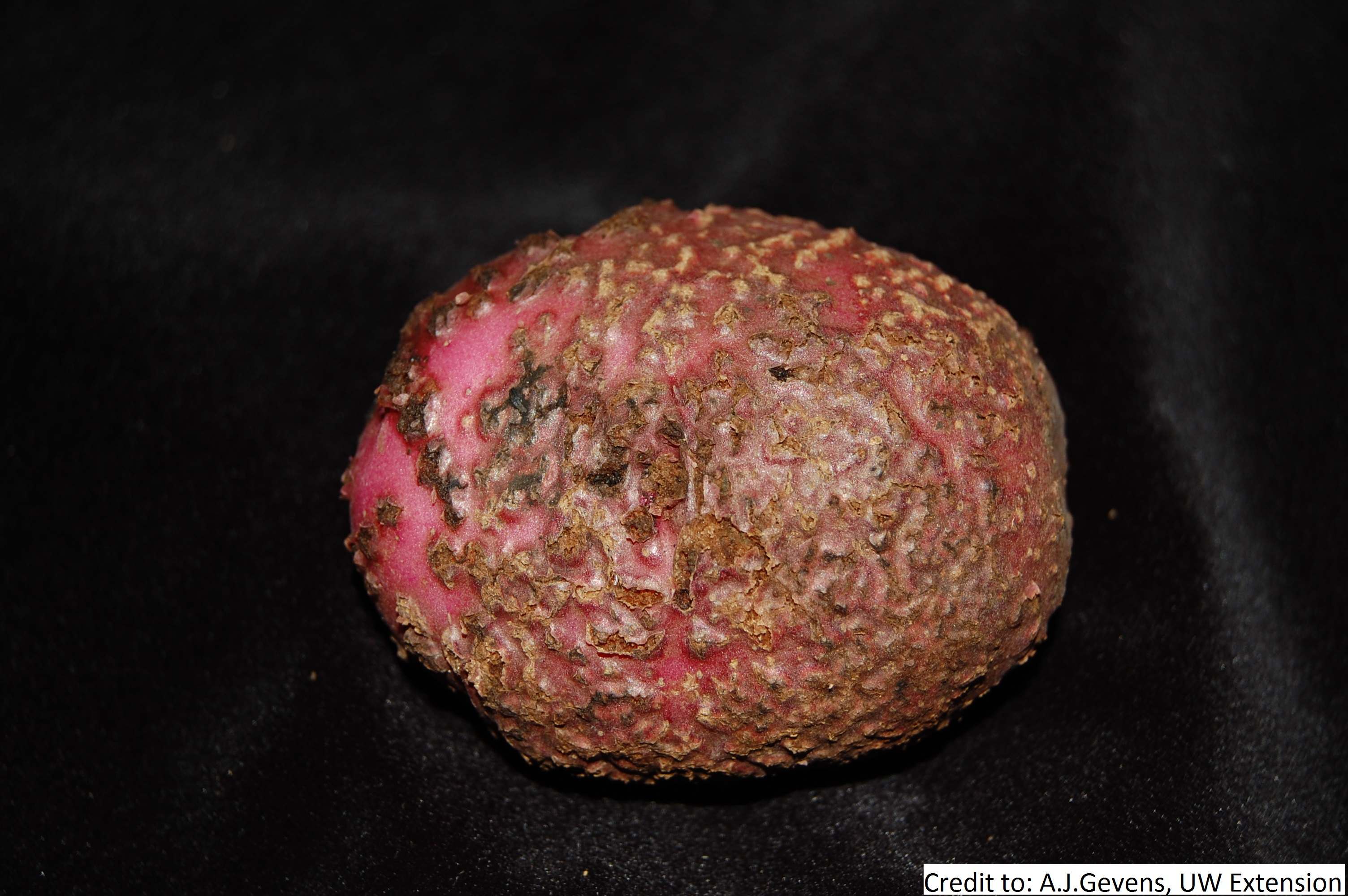
Potato tuber covered in powdery scabs

S. subterranea is an obligate parasite phytomyxea that infects the below ground structures of the host. Infection leads to hypertrophy and hyperplasia of the host cells and eventual bursting. However, the mechanism behind this is still unknown. Zoospores infect the root hairs by attaching to the outer surface, encysting, and then penetrating the epidermis through lenticels and stomata. Once inside, the multinucleate plasmodium divides to spread and produce more zoospores. The plasmodium causes the infected host cells to multiply rapidly and enlarge into a gall. This rapid multiplication also produces uninucleate cells that aggregate together as sporosori. The sporosori look like a powdery mass within the gall, which gives this disease its name. Eventually the gall swells and bursts out the epidermis of the tuber, releasing the spores back into the soil. Gall severity depends on inoculum level, environment, and potato skin type. Infection is most prevalent in the early stages of tuber formation while the potato tissue is unsuberized. But, infection can occur at all stages on development. White and red skinned potatoes and highly susceptible while russet skinned are somewhat resistant. Russet skin is thicker and has higher levels of the LOX protein which is used as a marker for resistance. There is little known about variation and sexual recombination within S. subterranea, therefore high priority is given to researching the variations within potato cultivars for researching host/pathogen relationships and management.

== Importance ==
Powdery Scab has important implications for commercial farming. Not only does the pathogen itself cause harm, but the pathogen is also a vector for potato mop-top virus, another plant pathogen. As a result, its presence greatly threatens potato marketability for farmers. The burst pustules can also act as a wound for other fungi to infect, such as Phytophthora erythroseptica and Phytophthora infestans. Thus, tubers with powdery scab can have increased incidences of other devastating diseases, including pink rot, dry rot, black dot, and late blight. Potato tubers will form powdery scab pustules that inhibit their ability to be sold. Many markets decline to buy potatoes with ugly scarring even if they are safe to eat. Research has not yet found an effective way to peel the scabs without damaging the potato. Potatoes that are rejected for sale create a large financial burden on farmers. Additionally, because soil borne inoculum can survive for years as spores, the pathogen is very difficult to eliminate once present. In Great Britain a recent Potato Council funded diagnostic project discovered that as much as 82% of fields tested positive for soil inoculum.

== Management ==
S. subterranea currently has no effective chemical controls. Therefore, other cultural management techniques must be used. Using certified clean seeds and planting in fields that have been historically healthy is the best form of control. These methods may prevent infestation from resting spores. Since infection is promoted by cool soil temperatures and high soil moisture, delayed planting can also help reduce negative effects of the pathogen. Delayed planting reduces the growth period in cooler soils subsequently decreasing germination of the spores. One limitation to this method is an additional decrease of early market yield. Pre-planting chemigation with metam sodium can reduce the propagules of the pathogen. Other common means of control include using resistant potatoes and crop rotations. Several cultivars of resistant potatoes include Granola, Nicola, Ditta, and Gladiator. Because soil-borne inoculum can survive for many years, crop rotations should involve alternate species that will promote a partial life cycle of the pathogen. This way the zoospores will germinate without producing new spores. Researchers have investigated the use of beta-aminobutyric acid (BABA) in promoting potato resistance. BABA triggers a plants systemic acquired resistance (SAR), a natural plant defense mechanism. When potatoes are inoculated with BABA and then later inoculated with the pathogen, S. subterranea, they exhibit overall reduction in disease. While pathogen reduction has been experimentally supported, further experimentation needs to be performed. Genomic data inclusive a genome draft became available in 2018, that might hold information that can be used to improve disease management.
