= Waddensea of Hamburg =

German Biosphere reserve

Coordinates: 53.9353°N 8.4727°E

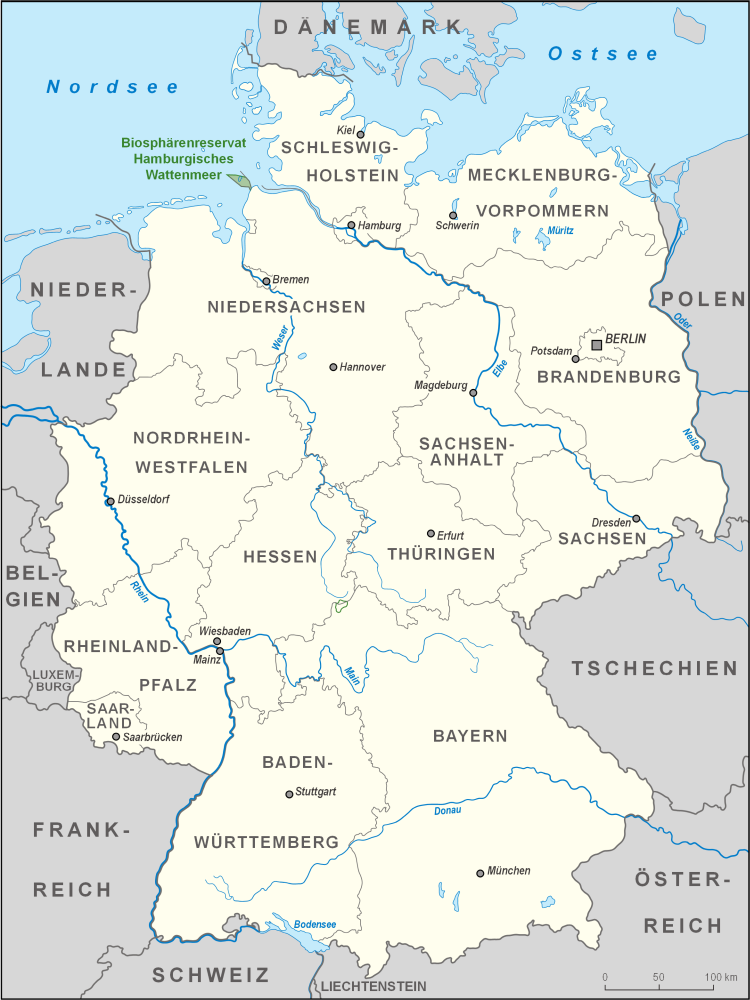
Area of the Waddensea of Hamburg on German map marked as Biosphärenreservats Hamburgisches Wattenmeer

The Waddensea of Hamburg between Elbe and Weser is a German Biosphere reserve. It was added in 1992 by the UNESCO in their "man and biosphere" (MAB).

This site is a part of the Wadden Sea on the North Sea coast, about 40 km (25 mi) north of the city of Bremerhaven in the Land of Hamburg. Situated close to the mouth of the Elbe River, it represents an estuary system which is the habitat for the seal Phoca vitulina and a large diversity of birds and fish. The nutrient-rich waters of the Elbe support a high biomass production and are important for fish spawning. The site includes sand and mudflats with channels, islands and saltmarshes. The site has been designated as a National Park, Ramsar site and EU Special Protection Area for wild birds.

The major ecosystem type is temperate coastal/marine zone. The major habitats and land cover types are tidal flats with benthic microalgae and seagrass (Zostera marina and Z. nana); salt marshes with Puccinellia maritima, Festuca rubra, Juncus gerardii, and Aster tripolium; sand dunes with Agropyron spp., lyme grass (Elymus arenarius) and marram (Ammophila arenaria).

The adjacent waters north of the biosphere reserve are intensively used by ships, so that potential oil spills are a major threat to the site. Also, pollution from the Elbe River impacts the ecosystem. An information centre on the Neuwerk Island provides an exhibition and educational materials for tourists.

As of 1998, 38 people lived in the biosphere reserve. The main human activities at the site are recreation and tourism, and some agricultural practices such as livestock grazing.

== Sources ==
This article incorporates text from a free content work (license statement/permission). Text taken from UNESCO - MAB Biosphere Reserves Directory, UNESCO, UNESCO.
