= Velma (mudflat) =

Velma (plural velme) is a Venetian dialect term derived from "melma" (mud). It is also used by Italian scientists to refer to lagunar mudflats (also called tidal flats), such as those found in the Lagoon of Venice. They are areas of shallow lagunar bottoms which are normally submerged, but emerge at low tides. They are generally without vegetation. Only associations of Zostera noltii (dwarf eelgrass) can be found. They originate from sediments carried by sea and stronger currents which are deposited on the lagoon bottom. They often surround the edges of the lagoon's barene (a venetian term for saltmarshes).

The velma, together with the barene (saltmarshes) and the shallow bottoms, constitute one of the most characteristic but also most fragile environments of the ecosystem of the Lagoon of Venice. They are subject to variations in their extent depending on the amount of materials (silt, sand and other sediments) they lose or acquire. Sediment acquisition leads to the consolidation of the velma's sediment soil and sediment loss leads to erosion of this soil. If the balance between consolidation and erosion fails, the velma and saltmarshes risk disappearing.

== Erosion and loss of velma areas ==
The loss of velma areas in the Lagoon of Venice has been occurring for more than two centuries. From the early 19th century the combined saltmarsh area had decreased from 155 km2 to 40 km2. This has also involved a loss of velma areas because many of them surround the saltmarshes.

Velma areas are often under bathymetric (depth) pressure, which makes them less likely to emerge at low tides, leading to loss of stability and potential loss of their ecological function. This has been caused by infrastructural works carried out in the last two centuries. In the 19th century breakwaters were built at the lagoon inlets to stabilise their shape and orientation and to intensify the inflow of sea current in order to create conditions for deepening them and the channels which start from them. This was done to facilitate the transit of larger ships into the lagoon. In the 20th century, an even deeper and wider navigation canal was dug from the Malamocco inlet to the port of Marghera for large container ships and oil tankers to sail to new industrial areas. The depth of the channel from the Lido inlet was also increased to let large modern cruise ships through. These kinds of interventions have led to the displacement of sediments which are lost out of the lagoon and an increase in depth of the lagoon floor form and average of -0.75 m to one of -1.5 m since 1902.

The average loss of sediments is 2.2 million m3 per year. Erosion in the Lido basin was 14 cm in 1930-1970 and 12 cm in 1970–2000; in the Malamocco basin it was 20 cm and 33 cm respectively; in the Chioggia basin it was 8 cm and 20 cm; in the mid lagoon 14 cm and 20 cm.

The average deepening of lagoon floor has also made the wave action created by winds stronger, producing a further erosive effect. In addition to normal strength winds, Venice can also be hit by strong winds caused the Bora from the northeast, especially in the winter, or the Scirocco from the southeast, which can occur from March to November. The latter, when combined a rising tide, can cause the acqua alta phenomenon (exceptionally high tides which cause flooding). Another erosive problem is caused by wave action created by passing motorboats.

== Shelter for benthic species ==
The velme are ecologically important because strong variations in salinity and oxygenation created by submersion and emersion turn them into an environment which is even more selective than that of the saltmarshes. As a result, they form Benthic zones. Their substratum gives shelter to Benthos (lagoon bottom species): polychaetes (bristle worms), Daphnia (water fleas), molluscs (particularly bivalves) and some small crustaceans, such as caridean shrimps, from the low tide. These, in turn, provide food for some species of water birds, both nesting and migratory.

== Food source for birds ==
Waders (called shorebirds in North America) are associated with the tidal variations in water level. They are found in mudflats which are exposed at low tide and or just about underwater in very shallow waters, where they search for their Benthos preys in the mud. Their thin, pointed beaks penetrate the mud to catch preys which do not have significant reactions. Their short legs allow them to walk where the water is only a few centimetres deep. Their legs and beaks are often brightly coloured, but their prey cannot see them and flee. During high tides, when their food is underwater, they rest at Roost sites. Some species feed throughout the tidal cycle shifting their feeding between mudflats and saltmarshes in synchrony with the tide rises and falls. The loss of mudflats and saltmarshes and disturbance at feeding and roosting sites poses a considerable threat to these populations. Their dependence on the presence of mudflats is a problem as these are one of the most difficult lagunar areas to restore and maintain. Many species are strongly migratory. They nest in northern Europe and Asia and winter on the Atlantic and Mediterranean coasts. Decreased food availability forces migratory species to prolong their flight periods, which results in a decrease in reproductive success and increase mortality.

Common waders in the lagoon are the black-winged stilt (Himantopus himantopus), pied avocet (Recurvirostra avosetta), Eurasian curlew (Numenius arquata), black-tailed godwit (Limosa limosa), common redshank (Tringa totanus), spotted redshank (Tringa erythropus), common greenshank (Tringa nebularia) and Eurasian oystercatcher (Haematopus ostralegus). The common redshank's nesting colony in the lagoon the largest in the Mediterranean, with 2000 specimens.

== Seagrass of the velma ==
Zostera noltii (dwarf seagrass) and especially its subspecies Nanozostera noltii, which is more common in the Lagoon of Venice, are found in velma areas. Like other seagrasses, they are important for stabilising, re-suspending and consolidating sediments. They provide a defence against erosion and reduce wave energy. They also protect the benthic species that live in the velme. An area where it has been planted in a raised artificial velma habitat at Punta vecia Sud had been colonised by 47 benthic taxa. The biomass is seven times higher than that of the areas nearby. Zostera is, however, sensitive to being smothered by shifting sediments and has a low capacity to recover when buried. This may be due to its relatively short leaves and its lack of vertical rhizomes.

In addition the mentioned roles, it plays an important part in the winter diet of the whooper and mute swan, the brent goose, wigeon and wildfowl.

== Protection of the velme ==
In the Lagoon of Venice some velma areas have been undergoing marked degradation due to the inconsistent nature of the bottom sediments or erosion. Consequently, there is degradation of the benthic species in the bottom sediments of the lagoon with pronounced bathymetric (depth) pressure. Projects to recover and regenerate these areas have been undertaken with the creation of new velma structures by creating confined areas and pouring sedimentary materials which include sandy and loamy components into them, using in part or totally materials from the dredging of the lagoon inlets. In areas under bathymetric pressure the bottom of the lagoon was increased in height to make it shallower. Small vivification canals were dug to direct the flow of water, improve sea water turnover and activate the processes of stabilisation of the bottom through an increase of primary production. Since these structures reach their highest physical and environmental value when they are colonised by Nanozostera noltii, a seagrass typical of the intertidal flats, these were planted in the intervention areas.

In the twenty-five years up to 2016, 18 artificial velma habitats covering a total of 2 km2 were created. This, together with the creation 11 km2 of saltmarshes, involved the reuse of 20 million m3 of sediments from the dredging of channels and canals. The creation of more velma habitats was in progress and more were planned. There is also a wider programme of planting seagrasses which also involves the planting of Cymodocea nodosa (little Neptune grass). It is found mainly near the inlets or in places with medium to high hydrodynamics and where salinity is not variable. It likes sediments with a high sand content. As it is of tropical origin, it starts growing rapidly in late spring, assuming an emerald colour, and does not grow in the winter, assuming a brownish colour. It is planted by the inlets or in canals or channels not far from them at a depth on -1.5 m or in artificial velma habitats in conjunction with Nanozostera noltii.
