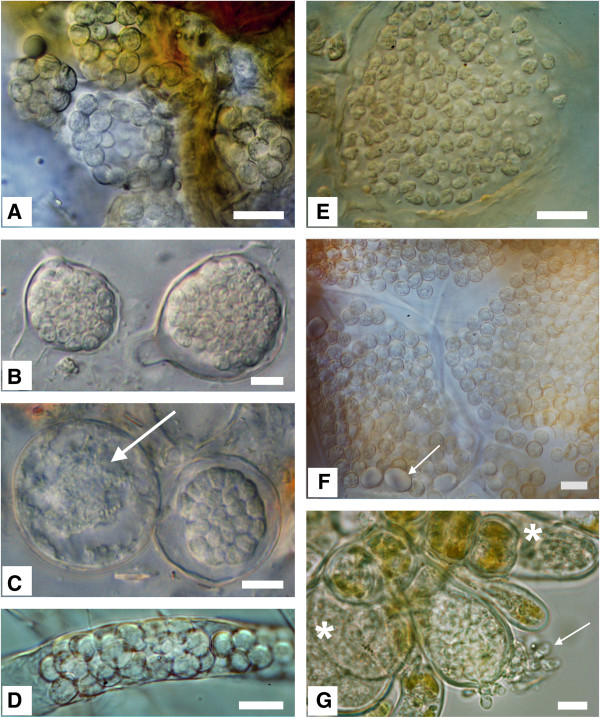
- Right column: Phagomyxida.

Scientific classification
- Domain: Eukaryota
- Clade: Sar
- Clade: Rhizaria
- Phylum: Cercozoa
- Subphylum: Endomyxa
- Class: Phytomyxea
- Order: Phagomyxida; Cavalier-Smith, 1993
- Family: Phagomyxidae; Cavalier-Smith, 1993

Genera
- Phagomyxa; Maullinia

= Phagomyxid =

Phagomyxids

Group of pathogenic protists

Phagomyxids are a group of obligate endoparasitic protists belonging to the subphylum Endomyxa in Cercozoa. Taxonomically, they are united under a single family Phagomyxidae, order Phagomyxida, sister to the plasmodiophores.

== Ecology ==
Phagomyxids are mainly parasites of brown algae, but some can parasite oomycetes.

== Taxonomy ==
The group was created in 1993 by Cavalier-Smith, when it contained only the genus Phagomyxa. Since then, Maullinia, a genus previously in Plasmodiophoridae, has joined the phagomyxids.

- Phagomyxa Karling, 1944
- Maullinia I. Maier, E.R. Parodi, Westermeier & D.G. Müll., 2000
