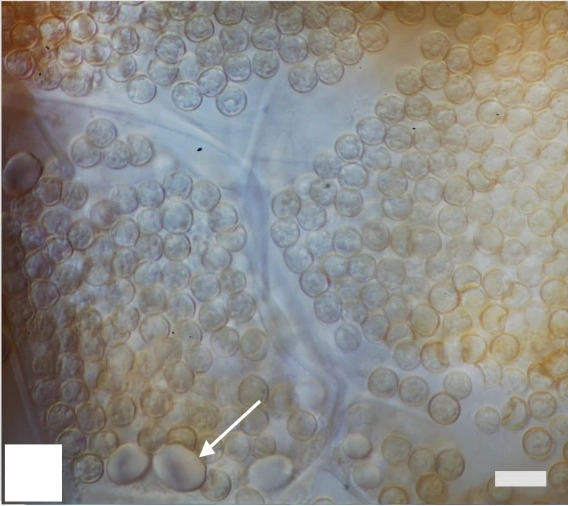
- P. diplantherae resting spores

Scientific classification
- Domain: Eukaryota
- Clade: Sar
- Clade: Rhizaria
- Phylum: Cercozoa
- Subphylum: Endomyxa
- Class: Phytomyxea
- Order: Plasmodiophorida
- Family: Plasmodiophoridae
- Genus: Plasmodiophora; Woronin 1877

Species
- Plasmodiophora bicaudata Feldmann 1941; Plasmodiophora brassicae Woronin 1877; Plasmodiophora diplantherae (Ferdinandsen & Winge 1914) Ivimey-Cook 1932; Plasmodiophora fici-repentis Andreucci 1926; Plasmodiophora halophilae Ferdinandsen & Winge 1913; Plasmodiophora maritima Feldmann 1958

Synonyms
- Ostenfeldiella Ferdinandsen & Winge 1914

= Plasmodiophora =

Genus of single-celled organisms

Plasmodiophora is a genus in class Phytomyxea.

It includes the species Plasmodiophora brassicae, which causes the disease cabbage clubroot.
