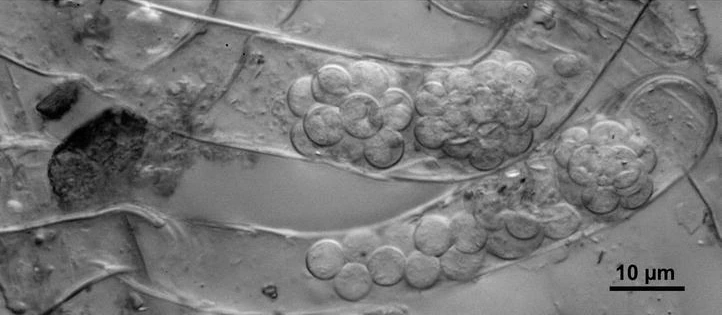
- Ligniera junci

Scientific classification
- Domain: Eukaryota
- Clade: Sar
- Clade: Rhizaria
- Phylum: Endomyxa
- Class: Phytomyxea
- Order: Plasmodiophorida
- Family: Plasmodiophoridae
- Genus: Ligniera; Maire & A. Tison 1911

Species
- L. betae (Němec 1911) Karling 1968; L. hypogaea (Borzí 1884) Karling 1968; L. isoëtis Palm 1919; L. junci (Schwartz 1910) Maire & Tison 1911; L. pilorum Fron & Gaillat 1925; L. plantaginis (Němec 1913) Karling 1968; L. vasculorum (Matz 1920) Cook 1929; L. verrucosa Maire & Tison 1911

Synonyms
- Anisomyxa Němec 1913; Rhizomyxa Borzí 1884; Sorolpidium Němec 1911

= Ligniera =

Genus of single-celled organisms

Ligniera is a protist genus of the family Plasmodiophoraceae.

The genus name of Ligniera is in honour of Élie Antoine Octave Lignier (1855–1916), who was a French botanist, known for his work in the field of paleobotany.
