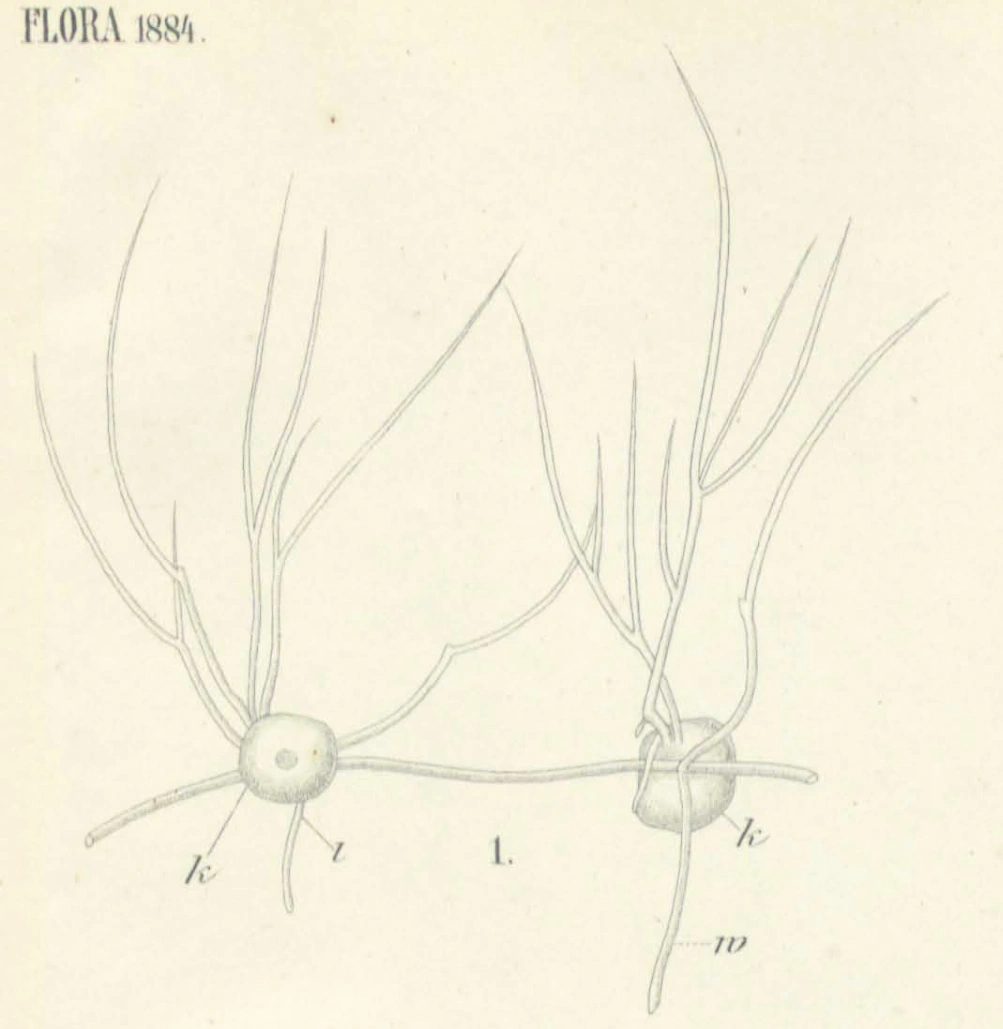
- T. parasitica in Ruppia tubers

Scientific classification
- Domain: Eukaryota
- Clade: Sar
- Clade: Rhizaria
- Phylum: Endomyxa
- Class: Phytomyxea
- Order: Plasmodiophorales
- Family: Plasmodiophoridae
- Genus: Tetramyxa; K. Goebel, 1884

Type species
- Tetramyxa parasitica K. Goebel, 1884

Species
- T. elaeagni; T. marina; T. parasitica; T. rhizophaga; T. triglochinis

Synonyms
- Molliardia R. Maire & A. Tison, 1911; Thecaphora W. A. Setchell, 1924

= Tetramyxa =

Genus of parasitic cercozoan

Tetramyxa is a cercozoan protist, member of the plasmodiophores, parasite of several flowering plants. It was first described by Karl von Goebel in 1884, in his work Flora. The genus is characterized by the appearance of resting spores (or cysts) in groups of four.

== Taxonomy ==
There are two accepted species:

- Tetramyxa parasitica K. Goebel, 1884 (=Thecaphora ruppiae W. A. Setchell, 1924) – parasite of Zannichellia, Potamogeton and Ruppia roots.
- Tetramyxa marina Y. Lipkin & A. Avidor, 1974 – parasite of Halophila stipulacea petioles.

The following additional species, though recognized as Tetramyxa, are listed as doubtful in some sources:

- Tetramyxa rhizophaga D. Lihnell, 1942 – parasite of Juniperus communis roots.
- Tetramyxa triglochinis M. Molliard, 1909 (=Molliardia triglochinis (M. Molliard) R. Maire & A. Tison, 1911) – parasite of Triglochin maritimum stems, ovaries and stamens.
- Tetramyxa elaeagni Y. Yendo & K. Takase, 1932 – parasite of Elaeagnus multiflora roots.
