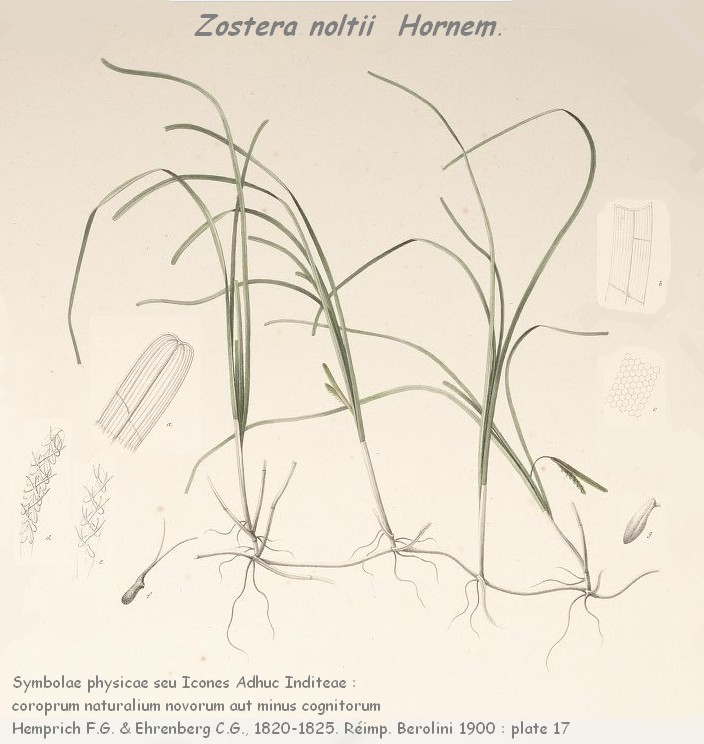

Conservation status
- Least Concern (IUCN 3.1)

Scientific classification
- Kingdom: Plantae
- Clade: Tracheophytes
- Clade: Angiosperms
- Clade: Monocots
- Order: Alismatales
- Family: Zosteraceae
- Genus: Zostera
- Species: Z. noltii

Binomial name
- Zostera noltii Hornem.

Synonyms
- List: Phucagrostis minor Cavolini; Nanozostera noltii (Hornem.) Toml. & Posl.; Zostera angustifolia Loser; Zostera emarginata Ehrenb. & Hemprich ex Asch.; Zostera minor Nolte ex Rchb.; Zostera nana Roth; Zostera nodosa Guss.; Zostera pumila Le Gall; Zostera trinervis Stokes; Zostera uninervis Vahl ex Rchb.

= Zostera noltii =

Dwarf eelgrass

Species of plant

Zostera noltii is a species of seagrass known by the common name dwarf eelgrass. It is found in shallow coastal waters in north western Europe, the Mediterranean Sea, Black Sea, Caspian Sea and Aral Sea and on islands in the Atlantic off the coast of northwest Africa. It is an important part of the intertidal and shallow subtidal ecosystems of estuaries, bays and lagoons.

== Description ==
Zostera noltii has a creeping rhizome that runs along under the surface of the seabed. Groups of two to five strap-shaped leaves grow out of nodes on the rhizome and each node also bears a tuft of up to four short roots that anchor the plant in the sediment. The leaves have three irregular, longitudinal veins and blunt, notched ends. They are up to 22 cm (9 in) long and contain air spaces which make them buoyant. Several separate male and female flowers grow on a short, spear-shaped lateral stem. The smooth white seeds develop inside a green capsule with membranous walls and are about 2 mm (0.08 in) long.

== Distribution and habitat ==
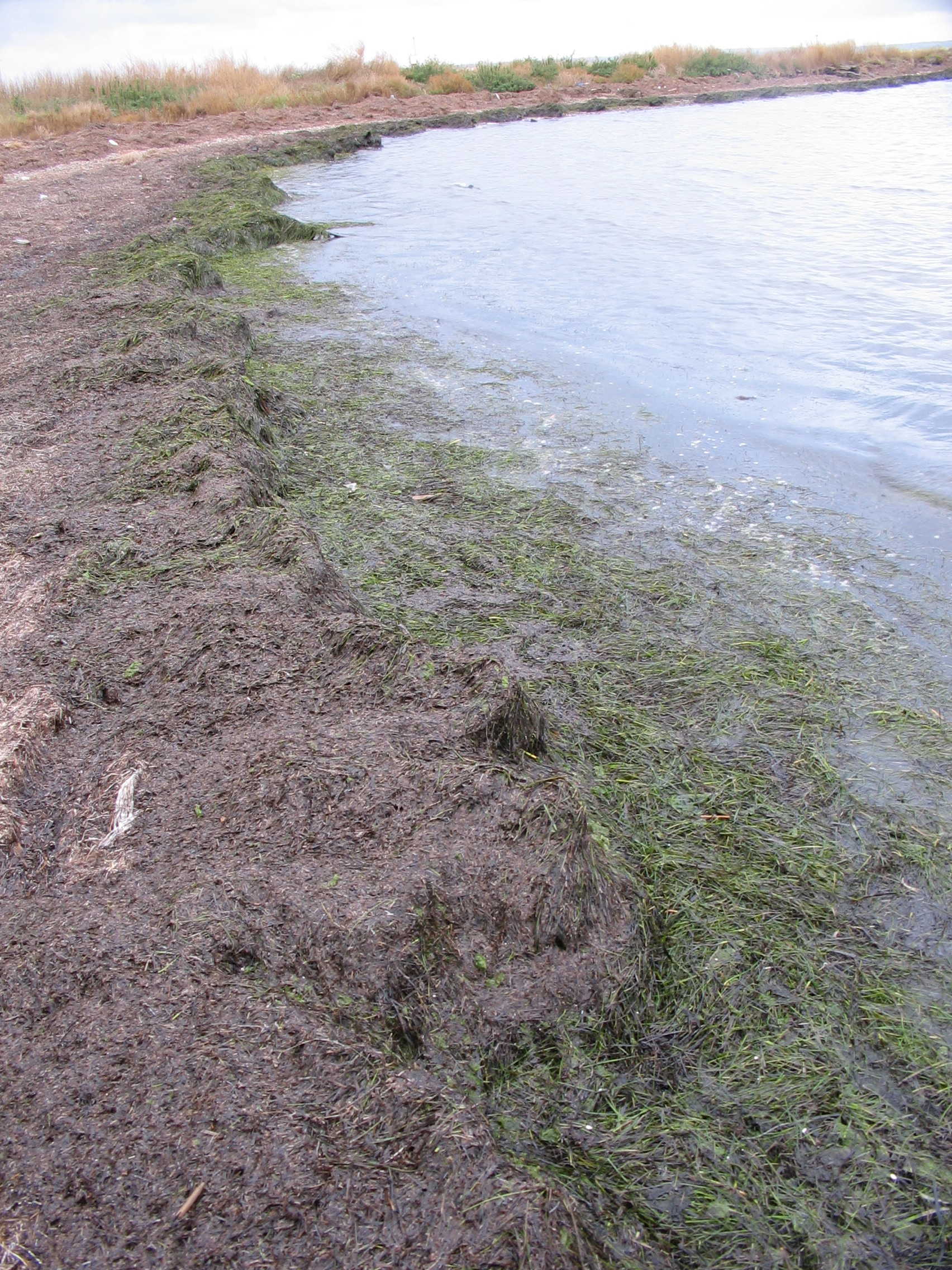
Beds of dwarf eelgrass on the beach at Port-Saint-Louis-du-Rhône, France

Zostera noltii is found in the eastern Atlantic Ocean along the coasts of Europe as far north as Norway, Sweden and the Baltic Sea. Around the British Isles it grows extensively in the Firths of Moray and Cromarty, the Wash and the Thames Estuary. In Ireland substantial quantities are found in Strangford Lough, Dungarvan Harbour and Dublin Bay. In the Mediterranean Sea and the Black Sea, it is restricted to the brackish conditions found in lagoons and estuaries. It is the only species of seagrass found in the Caspian Sea and the Aral Sea. It also grows in Morocco, Mauritania, and the Canary Islands, with the southernmost known population in the Saloum Delta in Senegal. It grows intertidally on fine sandy or muddy substrates and can tolerate various levels of salinity. It tends to grow in a band higher up the beach than Zostera marina beds and is often mixed with other seagrasses (Ruppia spp.). It grows subtidally in deeper water when it is in low salinity or brackish water in estuaries and lagoons. It is adversely affected by high nutrient levels and cloudy water.

== Biology ==
Growth of Zostera noltii starts in the spring with the appearance of new leaves and the lengthening and branching of the rhizome. Dense beds of shoots appear with seagrass meadows covering the intertidal flats during the summer, and at this time, flowering takes place. By autumn growth has stopped and over the winter most of the leaves either get broken off or are eaten by birds so that the only parts left are the submerged rhizomes. A clump of rhizomes may live for many years.

The male flowers release strands of pollen which are of about the same density as the surrounding water and which remain capable of fertilising female flowers for several days. The seed capsules are photosynthetic and contain a bubble of air. After some weeks they split open and the seed sink to the bottom. Alternatively, the capsules may become detached from the plant and float away, releasing the seed elsewhere. The seeds are dispersed by waves and currents, or sometimes on the feet or in the gut of a bird.

== Ecology ==
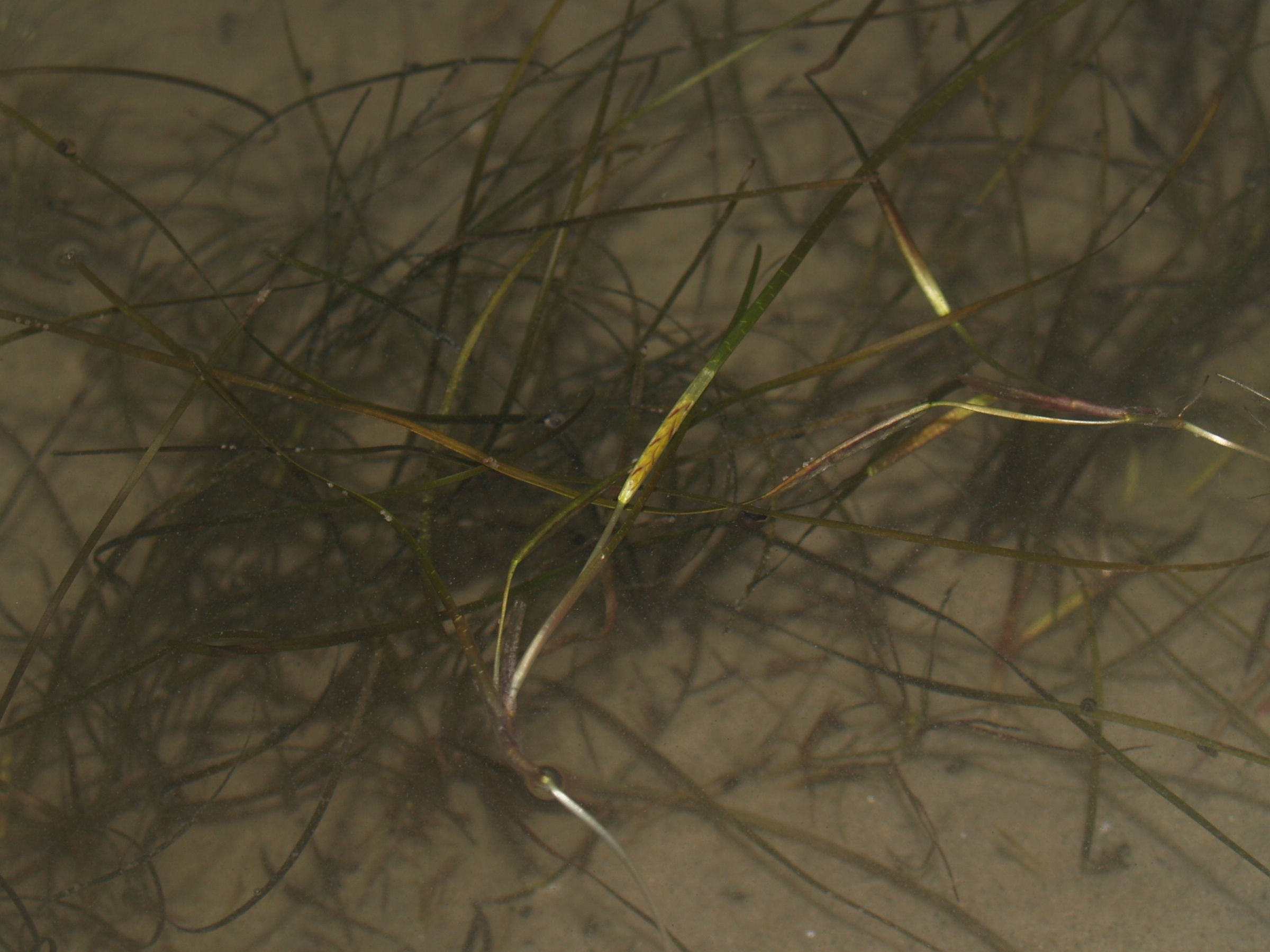
Zostera noltii stabilises the seabed.

Seagrass beds are highly productive and form the basis of important coastal ecosystems. Many different species of algae grow epiphytically on Zostera noltii. These include the brown algae species Cladosiphon zosterae, Halothrix lumbricalis, Leblondiella densa, Myrionema magnusii and Punctaria crispata. These also grow on other seagrasses such as Zostera marina. A parasite, Plasmodiophora bicaudata, attacks eel grasses, including Zostera noltii. It prevents further growth between the nodes and damages clumps with the leaves growing in tufts, causing what is known as wasting disease. Eel grass beds provide a refuge for many invertebrates and a safe haven for developing juvenile fish. The detritus produced when the leaves decay in winter enriches the sediment. The decomposing tissues are the basis for a food chain and large numbers of protists are found in the water column nearby feeding on leached organic compounds and the bacteria that break down the tissues.

Zostera noltii plays an important part in the winter diet of the whooper swan (Cygnus cygnus), the mute swan (Cygnus olor), the brent goose (Branta bernicla) and the wigeon (Anas penelope) and in fact, overwintering populations of brent goose in Europe have declined since wasting disease has become established and reduced the quantity of eel grass available. Wigeon numbers have also declined. They are shy birds and only resort to feeding on Zostera noltii when the seagrass beds lower down the beach are exhausted. At least some of the seeds of eel grass have been found to germinate freely after they have passed through the gut of wildfowl and this provides a means by which the eel grass may travel dozens of kilometres (miles) and increase its range. However, seedlings of Zostera noltii are seldom encountered and vegetative reproduction, in which sections of rhizome become detached from the parent plant, is probably the most common means of spread.

Zostera noltii and other seagrasses are important in stabilising sediments and reducing wave energy and may provide a coastal defence against erosion. It is however sensitive to being smothered by shifting sediment and has a low capacity to recover when buried. This may be due to its relatively short leaves and its lack of vertical rhizomes. It is regularly exposed on the foreshore at low tide and is resistant to desiccation. Although it supports a biodiverse assortment of animal species, these are more numerous in subtidal beds. Although Zostera noltii populations may be declining slowly, the IUCN Red List of Threatened Species lists it as being of "least concern".
