= Clubroot =

Common fungal disease of plants of the family Brassicaceae

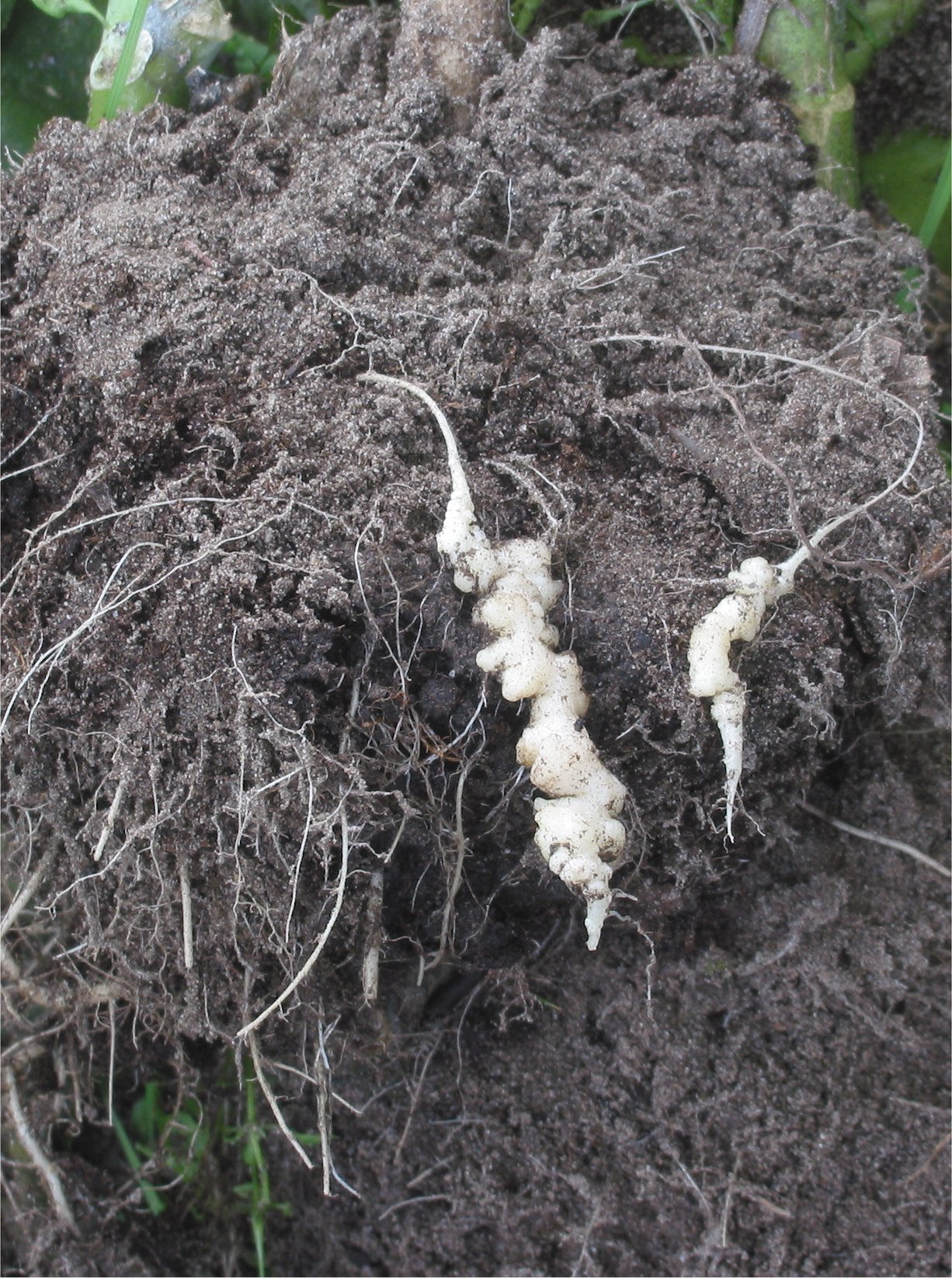
Clubroot on cauliflower

Clubroot is a common disease of cabbages, canola, broccoli, cauliflower, Brussels sprouts, radishes, turnips, stocks, wallflowers and other plants of the family Brassicaceae (Cruciferae). It is caused by Plasmodiophora brassicae, which was once considered a slime mold but is now a protist in the class Phytomyxea. It is the first phytomyxean for which the genome has been sequenced. The pathogen can evolve rapidly, and in Canada alone, 55 distinct pathotypes (sometimes called races) have been identified as of 2023, an increase from 43 pathotypes in 2020. It can cause club- or spindle-like galls to form on latent roots, interfering with head development, and followed often by decline in vigor or by death. It is an important disease, affecting an estimated 10% of the total cultured area worldwide.

There are records of clubroot from the 13th century in Europe. Plasmodiophora brassicae was discovered and named in 1875 by Russian scientist Mikhail Woronin after an epidemic in cabbage crops in St. Petersburg.

Other English names for clubroot include finger-and-toe or anbury, the latter also meaning a soft tumor on a horse.

The potential of cultural practices to reduce crop losses due to clubroot is limited, and potential chemical treatments to control the disease are either not effective in field conditions, banned due to environmental regulations, or are not cost effective. Breeding of clubroot-resistant cultivars is the most common and effective method of control in canola, but the pathogen can evolve to affect these resistant plants in as little as four years. These stronger pathogens are called resistance-breaking pathotypes, and they have become a major challenge in clubroot management.

== In cabbages ==
Cabbage clubroot is a disease of Brassicaceae (mustard family or cabbage family) caused by the soil-borne Plasmodiophora brassicae. The disease first appears scattered in fields, but in successive seasons it will infect the entire field, reducing the yield significantly and sometimes resulting in no yield at all. Symptoms appear as yellowing, wilting, stunting, and galls on the roots. It is transmitted by contaminated transplants, animals, surface water runoff, contaminated equipment, and irrigation water. The pathogen can survive in a field for years as resting spores without a host present and will infect the next crop planted if it is a susceptible host. This pathogen prefers a wet climate and a pH around 5.7, so proper irrigation and the addition of compounds that raise the pH can be used to control this disease. Other control methods include sanitation to prevent transmission, chemical control, and resistant varieties.

== Hosts and symptoms ==
Cabbage clubroot affects cabbage, Chinese cabbage, canola, and Brussels sprouts most severely, but it has a range of hosts that it affects less severely like kohlrabi, kale, cauliflower, collards, broccoli, rutabaga, sea kale, turnips, and radishes.

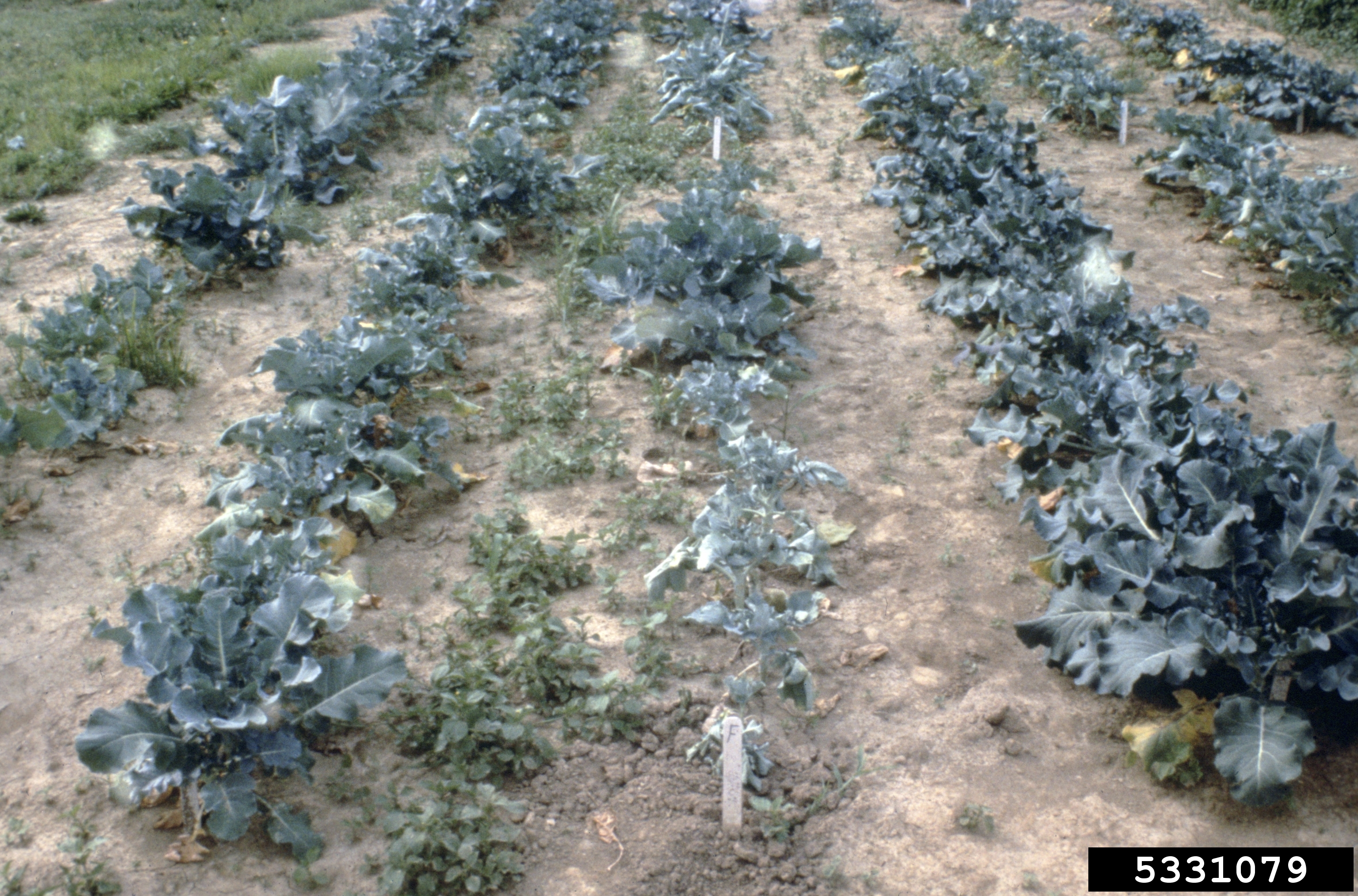
Wilting and yellowing of plants in cabbage field.

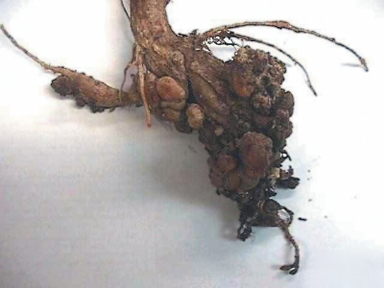
Galls on plant roots.

Developing plants may not show any symptoms but as the plants get older they will start to show symptoms of chlorosis or yellowing, wilting during hot days, and exhibit stunted growth. Below ground, the roots experience cell proliferation due to increased auxin or growth hormone production from the plant as well as the pathogen. This causes the formation of galls that can grow big enough to restrict the xylem tissue inhibiting efficient water uptake by the plant. Galls appear like clubs or spindles on the roots. Eventually the roots will rot and the plant will die.

== Disease cycle ==
In the spring, resting spores in the soil germinate and produce zoospores. These zoospores swim through the moist soil and enter host plants through wounds or root hairs. A plasmodium is formed from the division of many amoeba-like cells. This plasmodium eventually divides and forms secondary zoospores that are once again released into the soil. The secondary infection by the zoospores can infect the first host or surrounding hosts. These secondary zoospores can be transmitted to other fields through farm machinery or water erosion. They form a secondary plasmodium that affects plant hormones to cause swelling in root cells. These cells eventually turn into galls or "clubs". The secondary plasmodium forms the overwintering resting spores which get released into the soil as the "clubs" rot and disintegrate. These resting spores can live in the soil for up to 20 years while they wait for a root tip to come in close proximity for them to infect.

== Environment ==
Clubroot is a disease that prefers warmer temperatures and moist conditions. Ideal conditions for the proliferation of this disease would be a soil temperature between 20–25 °C and a pH less than 6.5; therefore, this disease tends to be prominent in lower fields where water tends to collect.

== Management ==
Clubroot is very hard to control. The primary step for management and long-term control is exclusion of the disease. Good sanitation practice is important with regard to the use of tools and machinery in order to prevent the introduction of the pathogen to a disease-free field. It is not uncommon for an inattentive farmer or gardener to unknowingly carry in the pathogen after being previously exposed to it at a different time. One should avoid purchasing infected transplants of cabbage so as to prohibit the infestation of P. brassicae. Soil type is also an important factor in the development and spread of cabbage clubroot; the use of sand will allow for the plants to grow in well-drained soil, thereby eliminating the possibility of the pathogen to proliferate in a hospitable environment.

Although it is difficult to eradicate the pathogen once it is introduced to a field, there are several methods for its control.

Liming has been an effective control measure to curb clubroot since the 19th century. This method does not eradicate clubroot but it will slow its development by creating unfavorable conditions. In addition, calcium and magnesium can be added to the nutrition profile of the soil to help control clubroot. To get efficient results the field soil, [pH] must be kept above 7.5. This takes massive applications to field soil in order to treat all of the soil where spores of clubroot are found. Combining lime with one other treatment has shown most effective.

Crop rotation with non-host crops is another method to help prevent clubroot. The half life of P. brassicae is 3.6 years. Unfortunately, long rotations of approximately 20 years are required in order to be effective. This is very difficult with typical canola rotations not being more than three years. Canola crop brings in high revenue to farmers. This would also require complete removal of Brassicaceae crops, such as wild radish and mustard.

Some fungicide has been found to help with clubroot, but it is expensive and would take huge amounts to saturate the soil. The best way to prevent contamination between fields is to clean agricultural equipment and vehicles which have come in contact with club root before moving to a new field. All contaminated soil, equipment and tools must not be moved to clean, disease-free fields. The best preventative method is field monitoring. Throughout the season, plants should be monitored for early symptoms of club root. More research is being conducted for early detection of club root in fall soils.

Fumigation using metam sodium in a field containing diseased cabbages is yet another way to decrease the buildup of the pathogen. Control and management practices on already infected fields help to reduce the overall impact that P. brassicae has on a field of cabbage and other cruciferous plants, but it is extremely difficult to rid an individual plant of the disease once it is already infected.

== Importance ==
Clubroot can be a reoccurring problem for years because it is easily spread from plant to plant. P. brassicae is able to infect 300 species of cruciferous plants, making this disease a recurring problem even with crop rotation. This wide host range allows the pathogen to continue its infection cycle in the absence of cabbages. Additionally, cabbage clubroot may be a stubborn disease due to its ability to form a microbial cyst as an overwintering structure. These cysts may last many years in the soil until it comes into contact with a suitable host, making it difficult to entirely avoid the introduction of the disease. Those growing cabbage need to be aware of the possibility of Plasmodiophora infestation by simply growing in particular fields that may have had cabbage clubroot previously.

== Canola infestation in Alberta ==
In 2003 clubroot was identified in Alberta, Canada, as an outbreak in canola crops in the central area of the province mainly isolated to the Edmonton area. Initially, 12 commercial fields of canola were identified, but that number grew to over 400 by 2008.

In 2007, Alberta declared P. brassicae a pest via the foundation legislation in hopes to help contain spread of the disease.

The Pathotype 3, is the predominant source for Alberta outbreaks. Studies showed that out of the 13 strains of P. brassicae, the most virulent form is dominant in Alberta.

Studies have shown that infestation numbers are highest at common field entrances and decline as you move further into the field, away from the entrance. From these results, it was concluded that infested soil on farm machinery was increasing spread of the pathogen. Some natural field to field spread is starting to be seen.

Several strains of canola have been tried, including European winter canola cv. Mendel (Brassica napus), as a clubroot-resistant crop. It has been found that few cultivators exist. Specific genotypes do exist, of the Mendel strain, which could be a solution for canola crops in the Canadian prairies.
