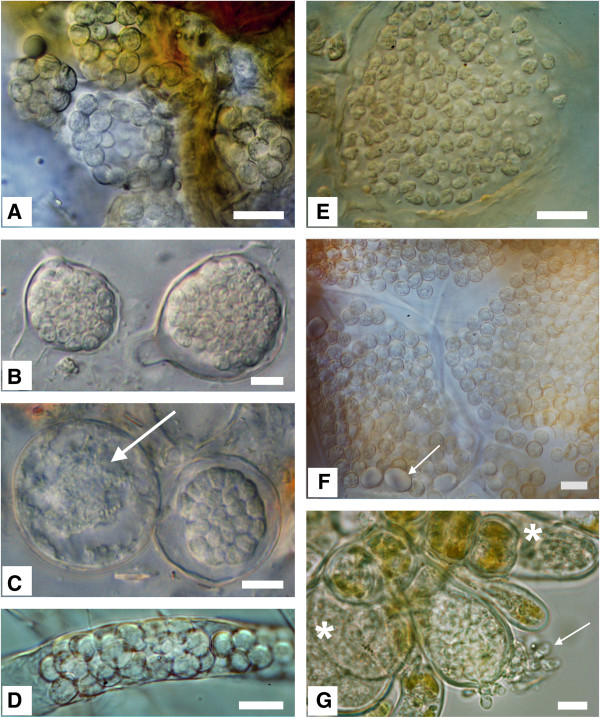
- Resting spores of different species

Scientific classification
- Domain: Eukaryota
- Clade: Sar
- Clade: Rhizaria
- Phylum: Cercozoa
- Subphylum: Endomyxa
- Clade: Phytorhiza
- Class: Phytomyxea; Cavalier-Smith, 1993

Orders
- Phagomyxida; Plasmodiophorida

Synonyms
- Phytomyxini Schröter, 1886:133; Phytomyxinae MacBride 1892:111; 1899:16; Schröter in Engler & Prantl, 1897; Doflein, 1911:672; Phytomyxinea Poche 1913:197; Phytomixida Calkins, 1926:328

= Phytomyxea =

Class of protists

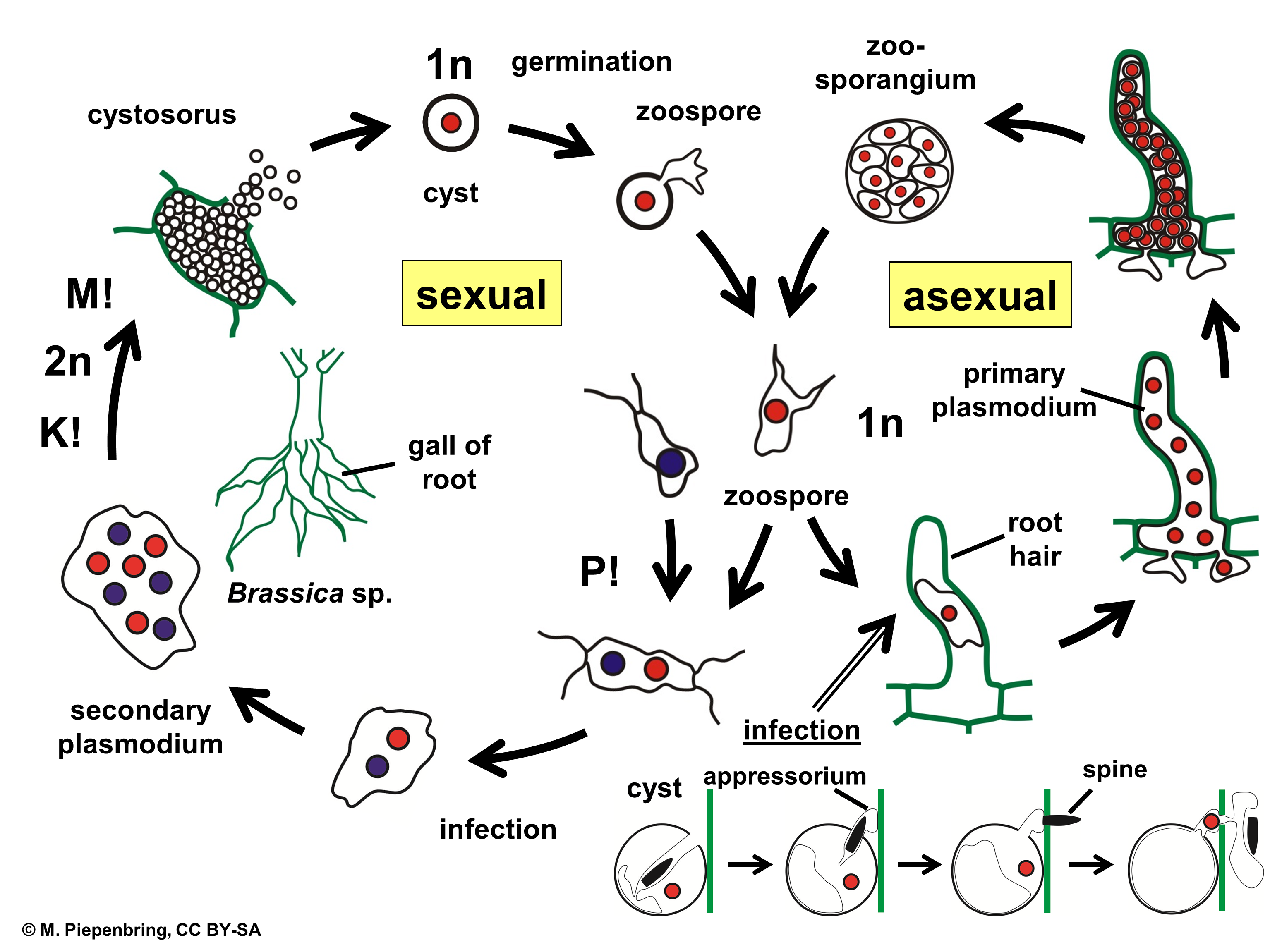
Life cycle of Plasmodiophora brassicae in cabbage.

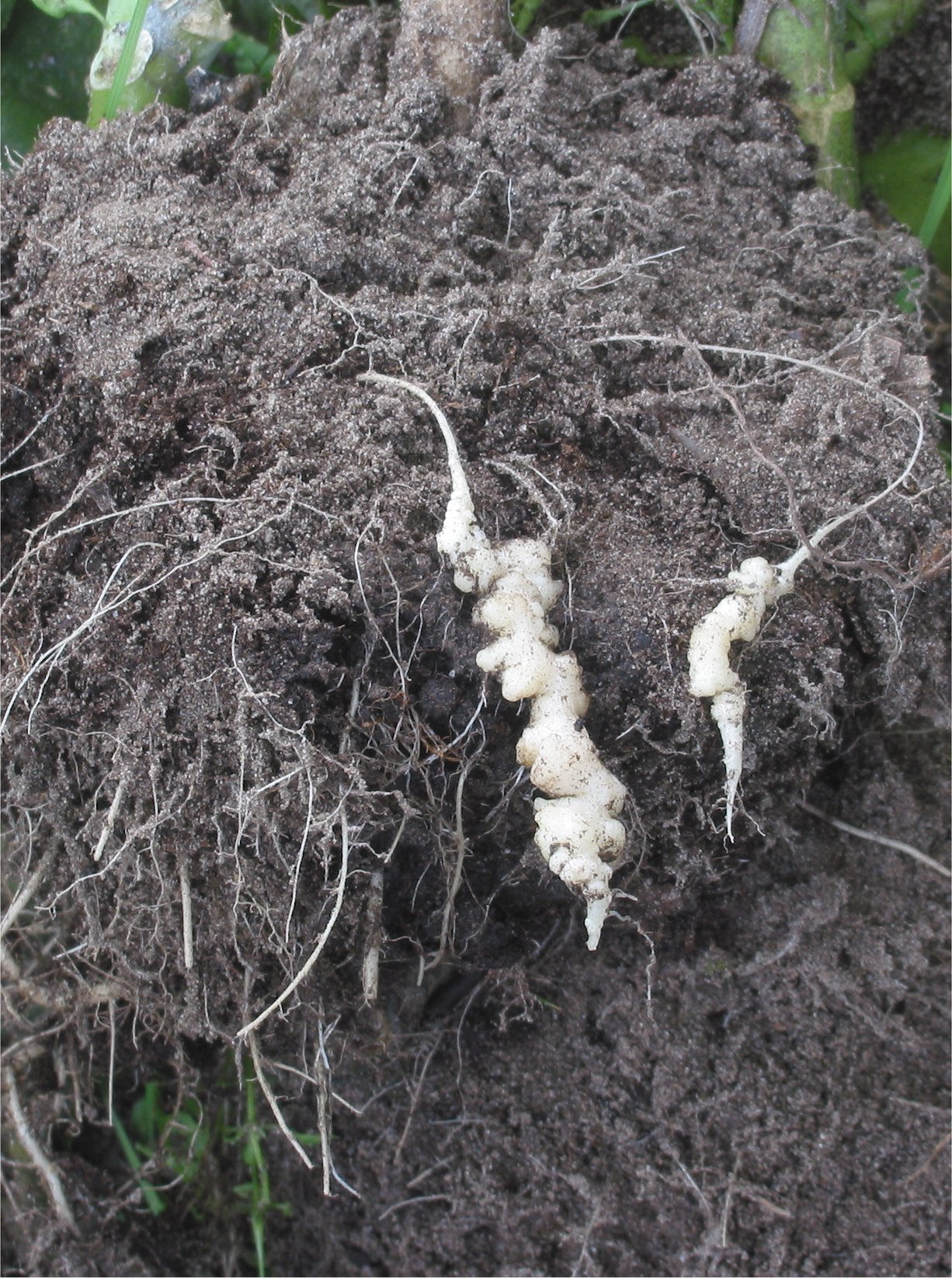
Clubroot on cauliflower

The Phytomyxea are a class of parasites that are cosmopolitan, obligate biotrophic protist parasites of plants, diatoms, oomycetes and brown algae. They are divided into the orders Plasmodiophorida (ICZN, or Plasmodiophoromycota, ICBN) and Phagomyxida. Plasmodiophorids are best known as pathogens or vectors for viruses of arable crops (e.g. club root in Brassicaceae, powdery scab in potatoes, and rhizomania in beets, especially sugar beets and some spinaches).

== Life cycle ==
They typically develop within plant cells, causing the infected tissue to grow into a gall or scab. Important diseases caused by phytomyxeans include club root in cabbage and its relatives, and powdery scab in potatoes. These are caused by species of Plasmodiophora and Spongospora, respectively.

The vegetative form is a multinucleate cell, called a plasmodium. This ultimately divides to form new spores, which are released when the host's cells burst. Both resting spores and motile zoospores, which generally have two smooth flagella, are produced at different stages. Within the plasmodium, dividing nuclei have a distinctive cross-like appearance.

== Classification ==
Plasmodiophorids were traditionally considered slime moulds, because of the plasmodial stage and are often wrongly classified as fungi, and given names such as the Plasmodiophoromycota. However, genetic and ultrastructural studies indicate they belong to a diverse group of protists called the Cercozoa, and are not closely related to fungi.

- Class Phytomyxea Engler & Prantl 1897 em. Cavalier-Smith 1993
  - Genus ?Pongomyxa
  - Order Phagomyxida Cavalier-Smith 1993
    - Family Phagomyxidae Cavalier-Smith 1993
      - Genus Phagomyxa Karling 1944
      - Genus Maullinia Maier et al. 2000
  - Order Plasmodiophorida Cook 1928 em. Cavalier-Smith 1993
    - Family Endemosarcidae Olive & Erdos 1971
      - Genus Endemosarca Olive & Erdos 1971
    - Family Plasmodiophoridae Berl 1888 (plasmodial slime moulds)
      - Genus Cystospora Elliott 1916 nomen dubium [Acrocystis Ellis & Halsted ex Halsted 1890 non Zanardini 1872]
      - Genus Phytomyxa Schröter 1886
      - Genus Ligniera Maire & Tison 1911 [Anisomyxa Němec 1913; Rhizomyxa Borzí 1884; Sorolpidium Němec 1911]
      - Genus Membranosporus Ostenfeld & Petersen 1930
      - Genus Octomyxa Couch, Leitner & Whiffen 1939
      - Genus Plasmodiophora Woronin 1877 [Frankiella Maire & Tison 1909 non Speschnew 1900; Frankia Brunchorst 1886 non; Ostenfeldiella Ferdinandsen & Winge 1914]
      - Genus Polymyxa Ledingham 1933
      - Genus Sorodiscus Lagerheim & Winge 1913 non Allman 1847
      - Genus Sorosphaera Schröter 1886
      - Genus Sorosphaerula Neuh. & Kirchm. 2011
      - Genus Spongospora Brunchorst 1887 [Clathrosorus Ferdinandsen & Winge 1920]
      - Genus Sporomyxa Léger 1908
      - Genus Tetramyxa Goebel 1884 [Molliardia Maire & Tison 1911]
      - Genus Woronina Cornu 1872
