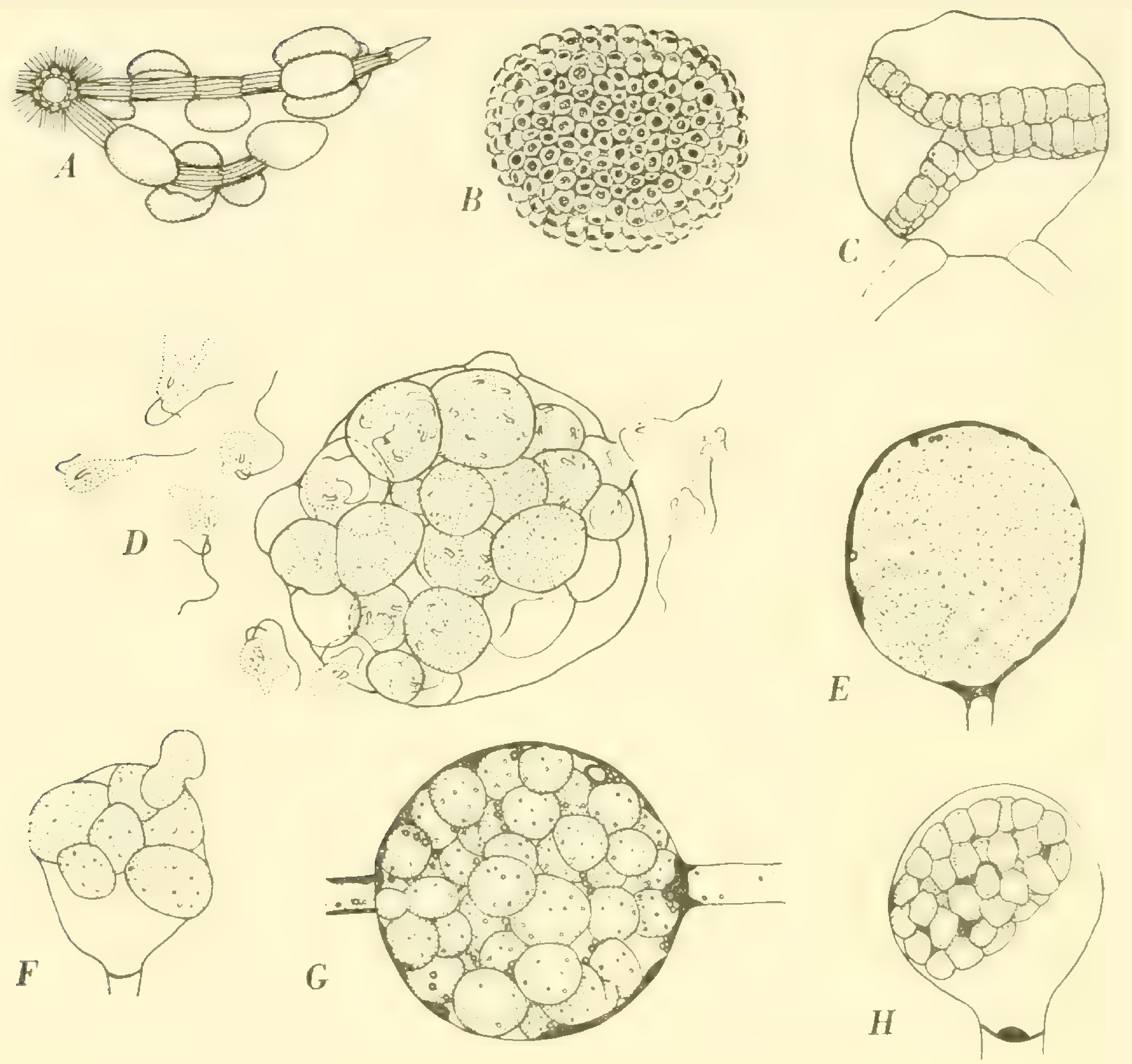
- "Plasmodiophoraceae" 1960 illustration.

Scientific classification
- Domain: Eukaryota
- Clade: Sar
- Clade: Rhizaria
- Phylum: Cercozoa
- Subphylum: Endomyxa
- Class: Phytomyxea
- Order: Plasmodiophorida; Cook, 1928
- Family: Plasmodiophoridae; Zopf, 1884

Type genus
- Plasmodiophora M. Woronin, 1877

Genera
- Ligniera; Membranosorus; Octomyxa; Polymyxa; Plasmodiophora; Sorodiscus; Sorosphaerula; Spongospora; Tetramyxa; Woronina

Synonyms
- Plasmodiophoromycota Whittaker, 1969; Plasmodiophoromycetes K. Cejp, 1957; Plasmodiophorales Engl., 1892; Plasmodiophorales F.L. Stevens, 1913; Woroninales A.A. Jaczewski & P.A. Jaczewski, 1931; Plasmodiophoraceae Zopf ex Berl., 1888; Woroninaceae M. von Minden, 1911

= Plasmodiophore =

Plasmodiophores

Group of fungi-like protists

The plasmodiophores (also known as plasmophorids or plasmodiophorids) are a group of obligate endoparasitic protists belonging to the subphylum Endomyxa in Cercozoa. Taxonomically, they are united under a single family Plasmodiophoridae, order Plasmodiophorida, sister to the phagomyxids.

== Ecology and pathology ==
Plasmodiophores are pathogenic for a wide range of organisms, but mainly green plants. The more commonly recognized are agents of plant diseases such as clubroot, powdery scab and crook root of watercress, or vectors for viruses that infect beets, peanut, monocots and potatoes, such as the potato mop-top virus or the beet necrotic yellow vein virus.

== Taxonomy ==
=== History ===
The plasmodiophores have historically been regarded as Fungi. The first description of plasmodiophores as a taxonomic group was in 1885 by Zopf, who united two genera Plasmodiophora and Tetramyxa in a common family “Plasmodiophoreæ”, inside the group “Monadineæ”, as part of the division Myxomycetes. The family was renamed “Plasmodiophoraceae” in 1888 by Berlese. In 1892, Engler placed the family in its own class “Plasmodiophorales”, later renamed “Plasmodiophoromycetes” to fit nomenclature standards.

In 1969 Whittaker, in his five-kingdom system, elevated the group to a separate phylum “Plasmodiophoromycota”, acknowledging them as protists instead of fungi.

In 1993 Cavalier-Smith included the plasmodiophores and their sister group Phagomyxida in their current class, Phytomyxea, as part of a polyphyletic phylum called Opalozoa, which at the time contained a diverse assemblage of unrelated zooflagellates, opalines and proteomyxids. Eventually this phylum was discarded, and the name Opalozoa was modified to label a group inside the phylum Bigyra containing the opalines, bicosoecids and related organisms.

Finally, after phylogenetic analyses, in 2002 Cavalier-Smith placed all Phytomyxea, including plasmodiophores, in the subphylum Endomyxa, inside the rhizarian phylum Cercozoa.

=== Classification ===
The number of genera varies between sources. There are three accepted genera in the group according to the WoRMS register: Plasmodiophora, Spongospora and Tetramyxa. Below is a complete list with genera that are not included in the register but appear in relevant sources:

- Ligniera R. Maire & A. Tison 1911 (=Anisomyxa Nemec 1913; Rhizomyxa Borzí 1884; Sorolpidium B. Nĕmec 1911)
- Membranosorus C.H. Ostenfeld & H.E. Petersen 1930
- Octomyxa J.N. Couch J. Leitner & A. Whiffen 1939
- Ostenfeldiella Ferdinandsen & Winge 1914
- Polymyxa G.A. Ledingham 1939
- Plasmodiophora Woronin 1877
- Pseudoligniera Hittorf et al. 2020
- Sorodiscus G. Lagerheim & Ø. Winge 1912
- Sorosphaerula J. Schröt. 1886 (as Sorosphaera) nom. nov. Neuhauser & Kirchmair 2011 (=Tuburcinia E.M. Fries; Sorosporium F. Rudolphi 1829)
- Spongospora Brunch. 1887 (=Clathrosorus C. Ferdinandson & Ö. Winge 1920)
- Hillenburgia Hittorf et al. 2020
- Tetramyxa K. Goebel 1884 (=Molliardia R. Maire & A. Tison 1911; Thecaphora W. A. Setchell 1924)
- Woronina Cornu 1872

These genera were once considered plasmodiophores until they were excluded:

- Cystospora J.E. Elliott 1916 – possibly a physiological symptom.
- Frankiella Maire & A. Tison 1909 – synonym of the bacteria Frankia.
- Peltomyces L. Léger 1909 – excluded as unclassifiable.
- Pyrrhosorus H. O. Juel 1901 – considered Labyrinthulida incertae sedis.
- Sporomyxa L. Léger 1907 – excluded as unclassifiable.
- Trematophlyctis Patouillard 1918 – a chytrid fungus.
