= Zoospore =

Life cycle stage of lower organisms

Heterokont zoospore of Saprolegnia with tinsel and whiplash flagella.

A zoospore is a motile asexual spore that uses a flagellum for locomotion in aqueous or moist environments. Also called a swarm spore, these spores are created by some protists, bacteria, and fungi to propagate themselves. Certain zoospores are infectious and transmittable, such as Batrachochytrium dendrobatidis, a fungal zoospore that causes high rates of mortality in amphibians.

== Diversity ==
=== General morphology ===
Zoospores are composed of a microtubular cytoskeleton base which extends from the base of the flagellum. The complexity and structure of this cytoskeleton is variable and is largely dependent on volume and size. One common feature of zoospores is their asymmetrical shape; a result of the ventral groove housing the flagella base. Certain zoospores progress through different phases, the first phase commonly referred to as 'the initial'. Others form cysts that vary tremendously in volume (14–4905 cubic micrometers) and shape, each with distinctive hair structures.

=== Flagella types ===
Zoospores may possess one or more distinct types of flagella – tinsel or "decorated", and whiplash, in various combinations.

- Tinsellated (straminipilous) flagella have lateral filaments known as mastigonemes perpendicular to their main axis, which allow for more surface area, and disturbance of the medium, giving them the property of a rudder, that is, used for steering.
- Whiplash flagella are straight, to power the zoospore through its medium. Also, the "default" zoospore only has the propelling, whiplash flagella.

Both tinsel and whiplash flagella beat in a sinusoidal wave pattern, but when both are present, the tinsel beats in the opposite direction of the whiplash, to give two axes of control of motility.

Attachment to the base of the zoospore is variable between taxa and may help with identification of species.

=== Morphological types ===
Figure 1. Zoospore types. The arrow indicates direction of movement.

In eukaryotes, the four main types of zoospore are illustrated in Fig. 1 at right:

1. Posterior whiplash flagella are a characteristic of the Chytridiomycota, and a proposed uniting trait of the opisthokonts, a large clade of eukaryotes containing animals and fungi. Most of these have a single posterior flagellum (Fig. 1a), but the Neocallimastigales have up to 16 (Fig. 1b).
2. Anisokonts are biflagellated zoospores with two whip types flagella of unequal length (Fig. 1c). These are found in some of the Myxomycota and Plasmodiophoromycota.
3. Zoospores with a single anterior flagellum (Fig. 1d) of the tinsel type are characteristic of Hyphochytriomycetes.
4. Heterokont are biflagellated zoospores (Fig. 1e, f) with both whiplash (smooth) and tinsel type (fine outgrowths called mastigonemes) flagella attached anteriorly or laterally. These zoospores are characteristic of the Oomycota and other heterokonts.

== Zoosporangium ==
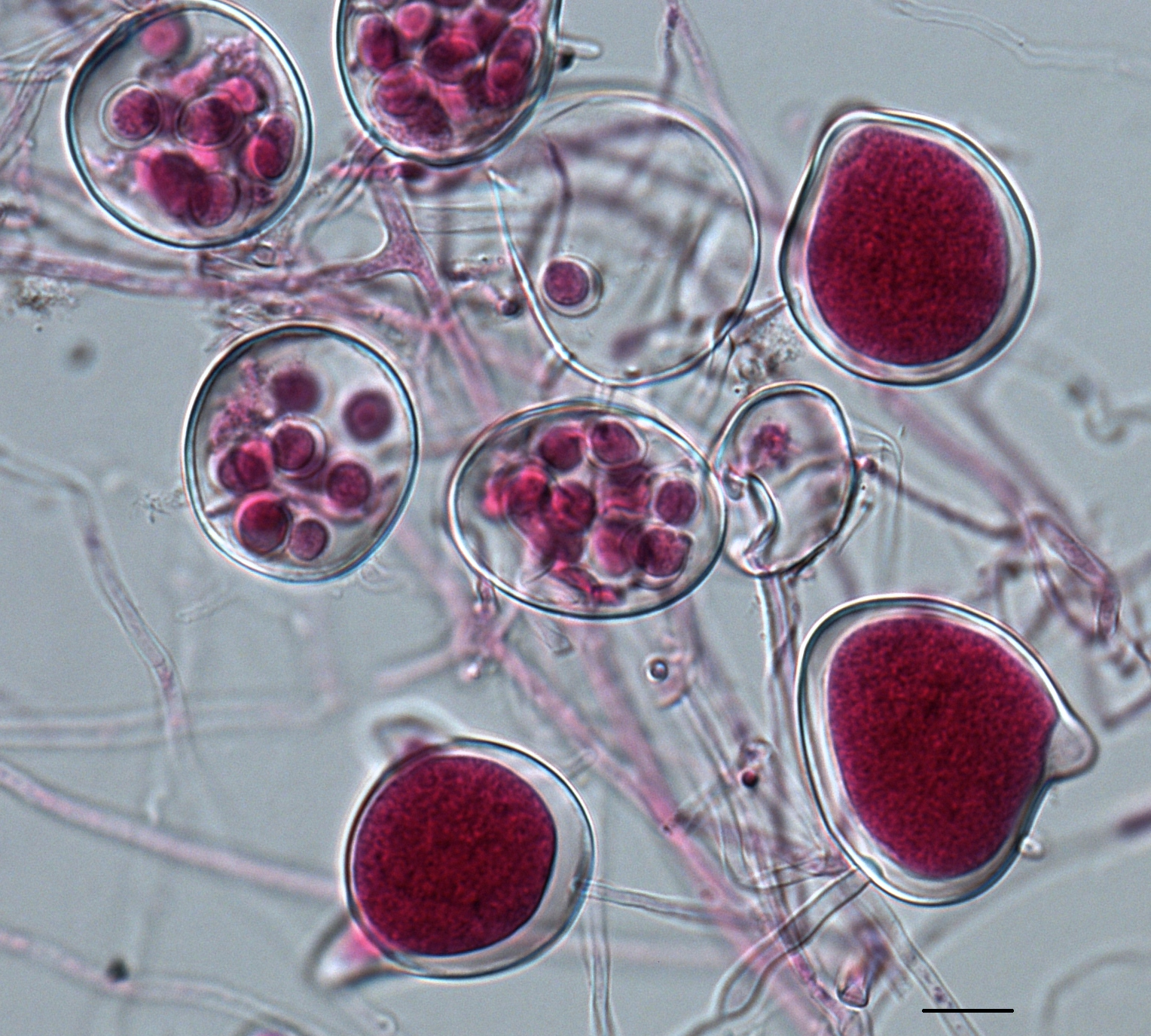
Zoosporangia and zoospores of Phytophthora agathidicida

A zoosporangium is the asexual structure (sporangium) in which the zoospores develop in plants, fungi, or protists (such as the Oomycota). Developing sporangia of oomycetes go through a process of cleavage in which a protein kinase, in the case of Phytophthora infestans, induces the sporangial cytoplasm to split and release the various zoospores. Release of the spores can occur either inside of the zoosporangium (intrasporangial zoosporogenesis) or exteriorly (extrasporangial zoosporogenesis). Spores absorb water and travel through the cell membrane for excretion.

== Infectivity ==
Different fungal zoospores may infect different taxa of organisms. Due to zoospores' aquatic lifestyle, fish and amphibians are ideal hosts. Some colonize exposed injuries in fish which may cause epidermal damage, leading to death in certain cases. Others may utilize species of frogs (such as Bufo marinus and Rana catesbieana) as carriers, allowing extended ranges of travel.

== See also ==
- Angiosperm
- Fern
- Gametangium
