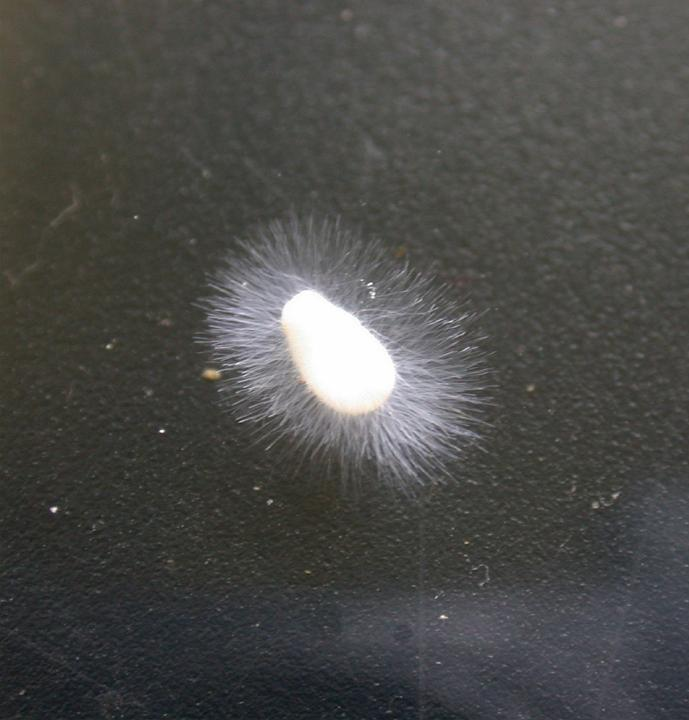
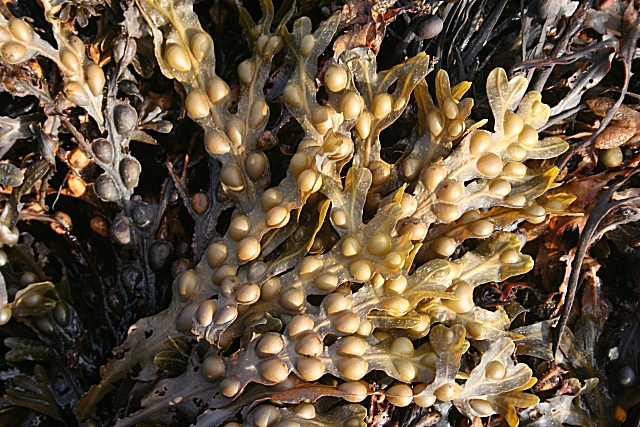
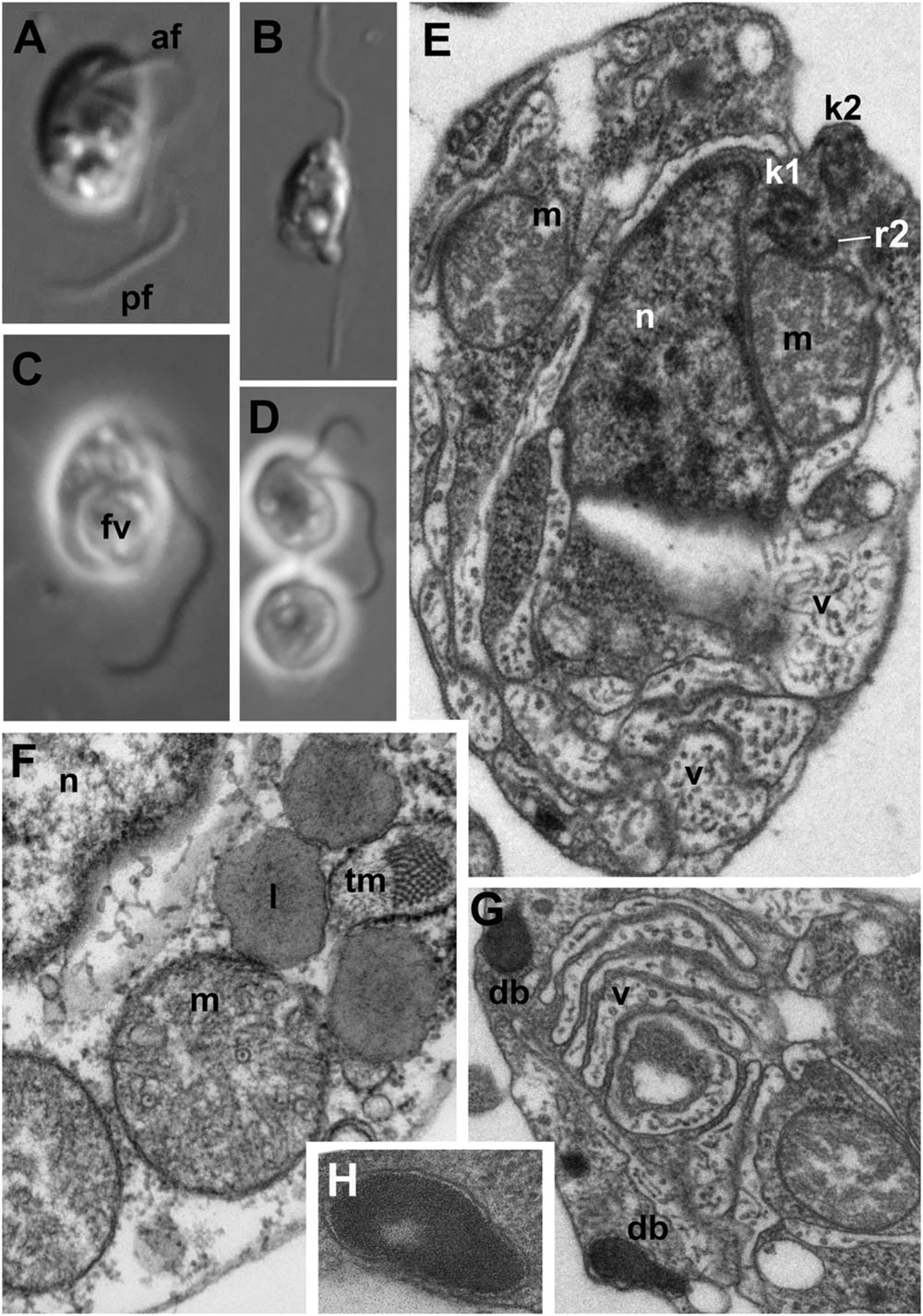
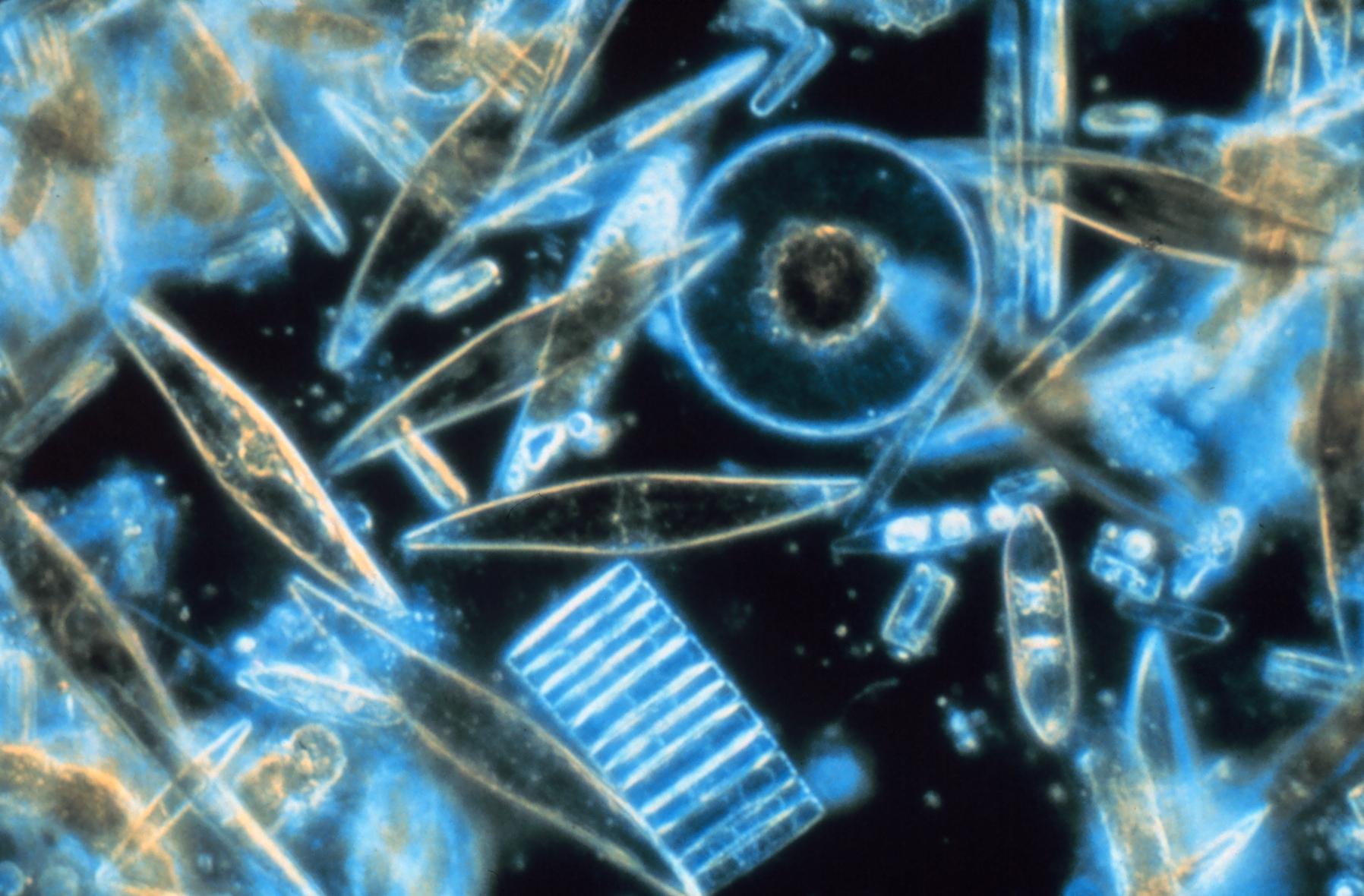
- Gyristan representatives (clockwise from top-left): water mould, brown algae, diatoms, Develorapax.

Scientific classification
- Domain: Eukaryota
- Clade: Sar
- Clade: Stramenopiles
- Clade: Gyrista; Cavalier-Smith 1998

Subgroups
- Pseudofungi; Oomycetes; Hyphochytrea; Ochrophyta (=Heterokontophyta); Chrysista; Diatomista; Bigyromonada; Developea; Pirsonea

= Gyrista =

Clade of eukaryotic organisms

Gyrista is a clade of stramenopile protists containing three diverse groups: the mostly photosynthetic Ochrophyta, the parasitic Pseudofungi, and the recently described group of nanoflagellates known as Bigyromonada. Members of this clade are characterized by the presence of a helix or a double helix/ring system in the ciliary transition region.

== Systematics ==
=== Taxonomic history ===
Gyrista was first described in 1998 by protistologist Thomas Cavalier-Smith in his work A revised six-kingdom system of life, originally as a superphylum containing two phyla: Ochrophyta, the heterokont algae; and Bigyra, which then contained the pseudofungi and bigyromonads together with the opalines. Later, the name Bigyra was modified to contain opalines, bicosoecids and labyrinthulomycetes, while the Ochrophyta, Pseudofungi and Bigyromonada remained as groups within Gyrista.

=== Molecular phylogenetics ===
Gyrista was seen in 2017 as the sister group to phylum Bigyra, which contains the Sagenista and Opalozoa. Together, Gyrista and Bigyra form the clade Stramenopiles or Heterokonta.

- Stramenopiles
  - Bigyra
    - Opalozoa
      - Placidozoa
      - Bikosia
    - Sagenista
  - Gyrista
    - Pseudofungi
    - Bigyromonada
    - Ochrophyta
      - Chrysista
      - Diatomista

A phylogenetic analysis in a 2022 preprint recovered a monophyletic Bigyromonada sister to Pseudofungi. The "Bigyra" is paraphyletic:

- Stramenopiles
  - Opalozoa
  - - Sagenista
    - Gyrista
      - - Bigyromonada
          - Developea
          - Pirsonea
        - Pseudofungi
      - Ochrophyta

== Classification ==
The 2018 revised taxonomy of Gyrista is the following, with the inclusion of new ochrophyte classes described in 2020 and 2021:

- Subphylum Bigyromonada Cavalier-Smith 1998
  - Class Developea Aleoshin et al. ex Cavalier-Smith 2017 [=Bigyromonadea Cavalier-Smith 1997]
  - Class Pirsonea Cavalier-Smith 2017
- Subphylum Pseudofungi Cavalier-Smith 1986 [=Heterokontimycotina M.W. Dick 1976]
  - Class Hyphochytrea Cavalier-Smith 1986 [=Hyphochytriomycota Whittaker 1969]
  - Class Oomycetes Winter in Rabenhorst 1879 [=Oomycota Arx 1967; Peronosporomycetes M.W. Dick 2001]
- Subphylum Ochrophytina Cavalier-Smith 1995 [=Heterokontophyta van den Hoek et al. 1978; Stramenochromes Leipe et al. 1994]
  - Infraphylum Chrysista Cavalier-Smith 1991
    - Superclass Limnistia Cavalier-Smith 1996 emend. 2006
      - Class Eustigmatophyceae Hibberd & Leedale (1971)
      - Class Chrysomonadea Saville-Kent 1881 stat. nov. Pascher 1910 emend. Cavalier-Smith 2017 [=Chrysophyceae Pascher 1914]
      - Class Picophagea Cavalier-Smith 2006 emend. 2017 [=Synchromophyceae Horn et al. 2007]
    - Superclass Raphidoistia Cavalier-Smith 1986 orth. mut. 2006
      - Class Raphidomonadea Chadefaud ex Silva 1980
        - Subclass Raphidophycidae Cavalier-Smith 2013
        - Subclass Raphopoda Cavalier-Smith 2013
    - Superclass Fucistia Cavalier-Smith 1995
      - Class Aurophyceae Cavalier-Smith 2013
        - Subclass Aurearenophycidae Kai Yoshii Nakayama & Inouye 2008 (as Aurearenophyceae) stat. nov. Cavalier-Smith 2013
        - Subclass Phaeothamniophycidae Andersen & Bailey 1998 (as Phaeothamniophyceae) stat. nov. Cavalier-Smith 2006
      - Class Chrysomerophyceae Cavalier-Smith 1995
      - Class Chrysoparadoxophyceae Wetherbee et al. 2019
      - Class Phaeosacciophyceae R.A.Andersen L.Graf & H.S.Yoon 2020
      - Class Schizocladiophyceae Henry Okuda & Kawai 2003
      - Class Phaeophyceae Kjellman 1891 [=Fucophyceae Warming 1884; Melanophyceae Rabenhorst 1863]
      - Class Xanthophyceae Allorge ex Fritsch 1935 [=Tribophyceae Hibberd 1981; Heterokontae Luther 1899]
  - Infraphylum Diatomista Derelle et al. ex Cavalier-Smith 2017
    - Superclass Hypogyrista Cavalier-Smith 1995 stat. nov. 2006
      - Class Dictyochophyceae Silva 1980 [=Dictyochia Haeckel 1894; Alophycidae Cavalier-Smith 2006]
        - Subclass Pedinellia Cavalier-Smith 1986 stat. nov. 2017 [=Actinochrysophyceae Cavalier-Smith 1995; Axodines]
        - Subclass Pelagophycidae Andersen & Saunders 1993 (as Pelagophyceae) ex Cavalier-Smith 2006
      - Class Pinguiophyceae Kawachi et al. 2002
    - Superclass Khakista Cavalier-Smith 2000 stat. nov. 2017
      - Class Bolidophyceae
      - Class Diatomeae [=Bacillariophyceae]
        - Subclass Corethrophycidae Round & Crawford 1990
        - Subclass Rhizosoleniophycidae Round & Crawford 1990
        - Subclass Eucentricophycidae Cavalier-Smith 2000
        - Subclass Bacillariophycidae [=Pennatia Pennatia Schütt 1896; =Pennatophycidae]
  - Ochrophytina incertae sedis
    - Class Olisthodiscophyceae Barcytė Eikrem & M. Eliáš 2021
