= Pirsonia =

- Scanning electron micrograph of Pirsonia diadema auxosomes infecting the diatom Coscinodiscus radiatus. Scale bar: 5 μm

Scientific classification
- Domain: Eukaryota
- Supergroup: Stramenopiles
- Phylum: Bigyromonadea
- Class: Pirsonea
- Order: Pirsoniales
- Family: Pirsoniaceae
- Genus: Pirsonia; Schnepf, Debres & Elbrachter 1990

Type species
- Pirsonia guinardie Schnepf, Drebes & Elbrächter 1990

Species
- P. diadema; P. eucampiae; P. formosa; P. guinardie; P. punctigerae; P. verrucosa
- Geographical distribution of environmental DNA sequences assigned to Pirsonia, as recorded through the Tara Oceans expedition

Genus of single-celled parasitoids

Pirsonia is a genus of marine single-celled parasitoids of diatoms. It has a distinct life cycle: flagellate cells differentiate into 'auxosomes' when contacting the surface of a host diatom, and feed through another cell type, the 'trophosome', which develops inside the host and digests its cytoplasm.

The genus Pirsonia was described in 1990. It is the only parasitic genus in the order Pirsoniales, a group of otherwise free-living marine stramenopiles. To date, six species have been described and reported from across the globe. One species formerly assigned to Pirsonia due to its similar lifestyle, P. mucosa, is an evolutionarily distant cercozoan that was eventually assigned to its own genus, Pseudopirsonia.

== Description ==
Species of Pirsonia are parasitoid nanoflagellates with small and flexible cells and a unique feeding mode and life cycle. The flagellate stages (zoospores) of Pirsonia have a flagellar organization similar to other Stramenopiles, a diverse lineage of protists characterized by tripartite hair-like extensions called mastigonemes present in one of the two flagella. Zoospore sizes range from 6 to 13 μm in length and 3 to 6 μm in width; the shorter anterior flagellum measures 15 to 25 μm, while the longer posterior flagellum measures 15 to 40 μm. Cyst formation has only been observed in a few species.

The life cycle of Pirsonia begins with motile zoospores with two flagella attaching to the frustule of a diatom host. The zoospores lose their flagella and differentiate into 'auxosomes', the main parasitic cell bodies that remain on the surface of the frustule. These auxosomes squeeze a pseudopod into the cell, either through the natural tubular openings of the frustule (rimoportulae or labiate processes) or between the girdle bands. This pseudopod then transforms into a 'trophosome', a different cell type that phagocytes and digests the contents of the diatom cytoplasm (i.e., the protoplast). The digestive material is carried to the auxosome, which consequently grows and divides. After the death of the host cell, the auxosomes detach from the trophosomes and transform into motile 'flagellate mother cells', which eventually divide and differentiate into zoospores, completing the life cycle.

Developmental stages and life cycle of P. diadema on Coscinodiscus host in girdle view. FMCs: flagellate mother cells.

== Ecology ==
Pirsonia is a genus of marine parasitoids with a global distribution. They specialize in infecting planktonic diatoms. As parasitoids, they infect, consume and kill their diatom hosts. Their life cycle is rapid and highly virulent, capable of causing total diatom population collapse in culture.

== Evolution ==
The genus Pirsonia is located within Bigyromonada, a group of Stramenopiles closely related to the Pseudofungi, which contains a major parasitic group, the oomycetes. Bigyromonads are mostly free-living heterotrophic flagellates. For instance, the genus Koktebelia, one of the closest relatives of Pirsonia, is a free-living predator of other eukaryotes. The sister clade of Pirsonia, Noirmoutieria, is another free-living phagotroph that consumes heterotrophic flagellates and diatoms. As such, Pirsonia represents an independent and recent evolution towards parasitism within the Stramenopiles. The cladogram below summarizes the position of Pirsonia among Stramenopiles, highlighting the transitions to parasitism with *.

- Stramenopiles
  - - - Bigyromonada
        - Developea
        - Pirsonea
          - - Pirsoniaceae
              - *
                Pirsonia
              - Noirmoutieria
            - Koktebelia
          - Feodosia
      - Pseudofungi
        - *
          Oomycetes
        - Hyphochytrids
    - Ochrophyta
  - Other stramenopiles (Opalozoa, Sagenista...)

== Taxonomy ==
The genus Pirsonia and its type species Pirsonia guinardie were described in 1990 by E. Schnepf, G. Drebes and M. Elbrächter. The species was discovered parasitizing the centric marine diatom Guinardia flaccida in the North Sea. Due to its unique life cycle, with differentiation into trophosome and auxosome, it was left with no certain taxonomic position (as Mastigophora incertae sedis). Electron microscopy observations revealed that the flagellate stages of Pirsonia present stramenopile flagella, with tripartite hair-like extensions (mastigonemes). However, there were some differences with the typical stramenopile organization of the flagellar cytoskeleton, leading the authors to wait for genetic analyses to establish its position within the stramenopiles. Six species were added to the genus: P. diadema, P. eucampiae, P. formosa, P. mucosa, P. punctigerae and P. verrucosa.

The first molecular phylogenetic analysis that included species of Pirsonia was published in 2004. It confirmed the position of all species firmly within the stramenopiles, near the hyphochytrids, with the exception of P. mucosa which was revealed to be a cercozoan and placed under a separate genus Pseudopirsonia. A second analysis in 2006 confirmed these findings, and the genus was placed into its own family Pirsoniaceae and order Pirsoniales (under the botanical code, Pirsoniida under the zoological code). Pirsonia was the sole genus of Pirsoniales until 2022, when additional genera Feodosia and Koktebelia were described, followed by Bordeauxia, Bullionia and Noirmoutieria in 2024. In these studies, another species P. chemainus was described, bringing the total to six.

=== Species ===
Name	Diatom hosts	Type locality	Ref
Pirsonia chemainus Tikhonenkov, Cho & Keeling in Cho et al. 2022	Unknown hosts	Strait of Georgia, Canada	
Pirsonia diadema Kühn in Kühn et al. 1996	Coscinodiscus granii, C. radiatus, C. wailesii	Wadden Sea (near Helgoland)	
Pirsonia eucampiae Kühn in Kühn et al. 1996	Eucampia zodiacus	Wadden Sea (near List)	
Pirsonia formosa Kühn in Kühn et al. 1996	Rhizosolenia setigera, Leptocylindrus danicus, Cerataulina pelagica	Wadden Sea (near Helgoland)	
Pirsonia guinardie Schnepf, Debres & Elbrachter 1990	Guinardia flaccida	Wadden Sea (near List)	
Pirsonia punctigerae Schweikert & Schnepf 1977	Thalassiosira punctigerae	Wadden Sea (near List)	
Pirsonia verrucosa Kühn in Kühn et al. 1996	Guinardia delicatula	Wadden Sea (near Helgoland)	
