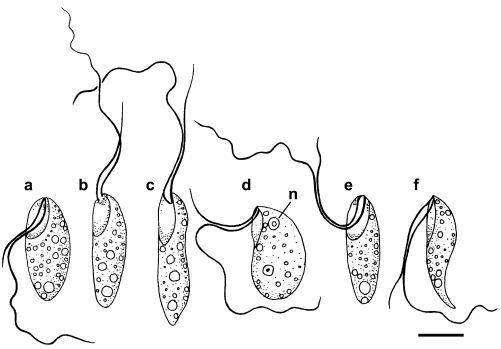
- Illustrations of Phyllomitus undulans by Stein, 1878. Scale bar: 10 micrometers.

Scientific classification
- Domain: Eukaryota
- (unranked): incertae sedis
- Genus: Phyllomitus; Stein 1878
- Species: P. undulans

Binomial name
- Phyllomitus undulans Stein 1878

= Phyllomitus =

Genus of flagellates

Phyllomitus is a genus of flagellates of uncertain affinity among eukaryotes.

== Taxonomy ==
Phyllomitus was described by Samuel Friedrich Stein in 1878. Its type and only species, Phyllomitus undulans, is characterized by cells with two flagella that adhere to each other. Phyllomitus undulans is one of many species of flagellates that have not been reported since their original publications, and for which no molecular data is available to verify their evolutionary affinities. Some authors have suggested that it may be a cercozoan of the order Marimonadida, as this order contains the only other genera known to have mutually adhering flagella: Auranticordis and Rhabdamoeba.

=== Former species ===
Over the years, various newly found species of flagellates were assigned to this genus, but none had the distinctive trait of adherent flagella, and their assignment was put into question. As a result, all species of this genus except the type species were separated into distantly related genera across the tree of eukaryotes, namely the stramenopile genus Pseudophyllomitus, the alveolate genus Palustrimonas, and the euglenozoan genus Hemistasia. Listed below are the species formerly assigned to Phyllomitus.

- Phyllomitus amylophagus Klebs 1893 → Hemistasia amylophagus
- Phyllomitus apiculatus Skuja 1948 → Pseudophyllomitus apiculatus
- Phyllomitus granulatus Larsen & Patterson 1990 → Pseudophyllomitus granulatus
- Phyllomitus salinus Lackey 1940 → Pseudophyllomitus salinus
- Phyllomitus vesiculosus Larsen & Patterson 1990 → Pseudophyllomitus vesiculosus
- Phyllomitus yorkeensis Ruinen 1938 → Palustrimonas yorkeensis
