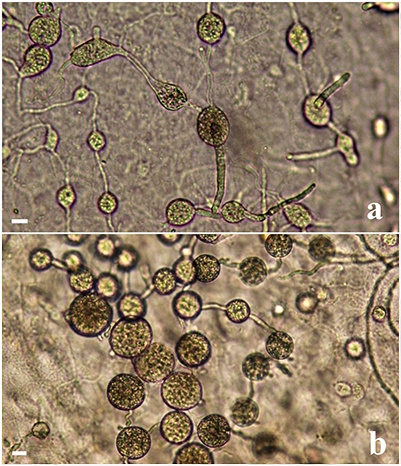
- Hyphochytrium catenoides

Scientific classification
- Domain: Eukaryota
- Clade: Sar
- Clade: Stramenopiles
- Clade: Pseudofungi
- Phylum: Hyphochytriomycota
- Class: Hyphochytridiomycetes
- Order: Hyphochytriales
- Family: Hyphochytriaceae
- Genus: Hyphochytrium; W. Zopf (1884)

Type species
- Hyphochytrium infestans Zopf 1884

Species
- Hyphochytrium catenoides Karling 1939; Hyphochytrium elongatum (Karling 1977) Dick 2001; Hyphochytrium hydrodictyi Valkanov 1929; Hyphochytrium infestans Zopf 1884; Hyphochytrium oceanum Karling 1968; Hyphochytrium peniliae Artemczuk & Zelez. 1969

Synonyms
- Hyphophagus Minden 1911

= Hyphochytrium =

Genus of single-celled organisms

Hyphochytrium is a genus of Hyphochytriomycetes. Hyphochytrium species occur in soil.

An example is Hyphochytrium catenoides.
