= Pirsoniales =

Scientific classification
- Domain: Eukaryota
- Clade: Sar
- Clade: Stramenopiles
- Phylum: Bigyromonadea
- Class: Pirsonea; Cavalier-Smith, 2018
- Order: Pirsoniales; Cavalier-Smith & Chao, 2006 emend. Prokina et al., 2024

Type genus
- Pirsonia Schnepf et al., 1990

Genera
- Bordeauxia; Bullionia; Feodosia; Koktebelia; Pirsoniaceae; Pirsonia; Noirmoutieria

Synonyms
- Pirsoniales: Pirsoniida Cavalier-Smith, 2018

Order of flagellates

Pirsoniales (in the botanical code, Pirsoniida in the zoological code) is an order of marine flagellated protists. It consists of six genera and a single family Pirsoniaceae.

== Description ==
Most genera of Pirsoniales are free-living single-celled predators with two flagella. The best studied genus, Pirsonia, is a parasitoid of diatoms with a unique life cycle, where cells differentiate into an intracellular feeding portion, known as the trophosome, and an external generative part, known as the auxosome.

== Taxonomy ==
The first Pirsoniales genus, Pirsonia, was discovered and described in 1990 from parasitic flagellates infecting marine diatoms. Its taxonomic position was left undertermined, as its structure and the differentiation into trophosome and auxosome was unique. After the description of its type species, another six species were added, and electron microscopy observations showed the flagellates have stramenopile flagella with tripartite hair-like mastigonemes. However, because of certain differences with the typical stramenopile organization of the flagellar root, the authors waited for genetic analysis to firmly determine their affinity to stramenopiles.

The first molecular phylogenetic analysis including species of Pirsonia was published in 2004. With the exception of P. mucosa (now Pseudopirsonia, a cercozoan), the genus was firmly placed among stramenopiles, near the hyphochytrids despite the lack of morphological similarity. In 2006, with a second analysis confirming the same findings, protistologist Thomas Cavalier-Smith revised the classification of stramenopiles and described the family Pirsoniaceae and order Pirsoniales (under the botanical code, or Pirsoniida under the zoological code), with Pirsonia as their type and only genus. He initially assigned the Pirsoniales to the Pseudofungi, a taxon containing hyphochytrids and oomycetes. Later, with multigene analyses, he separated it into the Bigyromonadea, a closely related taxon that also includes the predatory Developea, and described the class Pirsonea to accommodate Pirsoniales.

In 2022, several new species of bigyromonads were cultured and given provisional names. Among them, one species of Pirsonia, P. chemainus, and two species representing new genera, Feodosia pseudopoda, Koktebelia satura, were resolved as part of the Pirsoniales through phylogenomic analyses. The cultures of these three species died before being formally described through more detailed observations, which prompted their re-isolation and formal description in 2024, as well as the description of additional new Pirsoniales species belonging to new genera: Bordeauxia parva, Bullionia fluviatilis, and Noirmoutieria diatomophaga, which belongs to Pirsoniaceae alongside Pirsonia.
