= Kaonashia =

Scientific classification
- Domain: Eukaryota
- Clade: Sar
- Clade: Stramenopiles
- Clade: Gyrista
- Family: Kaonashiidae; Weston, Eglit & Simpson 2023
- Genus: Kaonashia; Weston, Eglit & Simpson 2023
- Species: K. insperata

Binomial name
- Kaonashia insperata Weston, Eglit & Simpson 2023

Genus of single-celled heterokonts

Kaonashia insperata is a species of single-celled phagotrophic stramenopiles. Described in 2023 from flagellates found in a soda lake, it is the sole species within the genus Kaonashia and family Kaonashiidae. Cells of this organism have cortical alveoli, extrusomes, a ventral groove, a short anterior flagellum covered in mastigonemes, and a longer posterior flagellum covered in thinner hairs. The cells are most similar to those found in developayellids, but a molecular phylogenetic analysis found no well-supported affinity to any specific stramenopile group.

== Etymology ==
The genus Kaonashia is named after the fictional ghost No-Face (Japanese: 顔無し, Hepburn: Kaonashi) from the Hayao Miyazaki film Spirited Away. The specific epithet insperata (from Latin insperata 'unexpected') references the unanticipated phylogenetic placement of this organism given its appearance.

== Description ==
=== Cellular organization ===
Kaonashia insperata is a species of free-living phagotrophic flagellates. The cells are roughly ovoid or bean-shaped, 7–13 μm long, abundant in simple extrusomes and flattened cortical alveoli underlying much of the cell membrane, and with a conspicuous ventral groove. The mitochondria have tubular cristae. The cell shape and size is distorted when containing food vacuoles and prey cells.

Each cell has two flagella: a long, posterior flagellum (2.5 times the cell length) that lies inside the ventral groove and trails behind when swimming; and a shorter, anterior flagellum (1.5 times the cell length) that points forward in a rapid beating motion. Along the anterior flagellum are long mastigonemes (flagellar "hairs") arranged in two opposing rows. Each mastigoneme has two unequal terminal filaments. The mastigonemes appear near the insertion of the flagellum up until the distal portion where they are absent, not extending to the tip as is usual in other stramenopiles. The posterior flagellum sometimes anchors to the substrate through sparse, thinner hair-like filaments.

The general morphology of their cells is consistent with stramenopiles, but their cellular structures are also found across other members of the Sar clade and even more distantly related eukaryotes. The extrusomes of K. insperata are smaller and simpler than most extrusomes in Sar species, and are most similar to those observed in telonemids and some rhizarians. The cortical alveoli are the unifying trait of alveolates; among phagotrophic stramenopiles they have been identified in developayellids, although larger and more limited than those found in K. insperata. The ventral groove is observed in many distantly related eukaryotes such as excavates; among stramenopiles, the highest similarity corresponds to developayellids. Regarding the flagella, a longer posterior flagellum is also seen in developayellids. The mastigonemes of the anterior flagellum are typical of stramenopiles, particularly placidideans and oomycetes due to the unequal terminal filaments, and the thinner hairs of the posterior one are similar to those used by some oomycetes to adhere to plant matter.

=== Reproduction ===
The cells reproduce asexually through binary fission. The flagella are duplicated and positioned at opposite sides of the anterior end of the cell. Throughout the cell division, cells are still capable of movement, and appear two-lobed at the anterior end, frequently with a food vacuole located near the site of cytokinesis.

=== Nutrition and habitat ===
Kaonashia insperata is one of the few described heterotrophic protists found in soda lakes. It is a species of eukaryotrophic aerobes, meaning they consume other eukaryotes and breathe oxygen. They feed on various species of unicellular algae, particularly those that are larger than 5 μm, such as Guillardia theta.

== Systematics ==
Location of Soap Lake, the type locality of Kaonashia insperata in the state of Washington, USA

Cells of this species were first obtained from the photic zone of Soap Lake, Washington, USA, initially under the name of isolate SC, together with residual Guillardia theta prey cells and bacteria. The flagellates were cultivated and studied under light and electron microscopy, which unveiled numerous morphological traits associated with the Stramenopiles. A phylogenetic analysis performed with the SSU rDNA gene placed these flagellates within the Stramenopiles clade. Despite the close resemblance with developayellids, there is no well-supported affinity to any particular stramenopile subgroup. As a result, the organism was classified as a new genus and species Kaonashia insperata in a new separate family Kaonashiidae, placed directly in the Stramenopiles. The description was published in 2023 in an article by protistologists Elizabeth J. Weston, Yana Eglit, and Alastair G. B. Simpson.

Resin-embedded cells of isolate SC were assigned as the hapantotype of Kaonashia insperata and deposited in the Institute of Parasitology of the Czech Academy of Sciences under the code ICPAS_Pro_77.
