= Abollifer =

Scientific classification
- Domain: Eukaryota
- Supergroup: Rhizaria
- Phylum: Cercozoa
- Subphylum: Filosa
- Class: Imbricatea
- Order: Marimonadida
- Family: Abolliferidae
- Genus: Abollifer; Vørs 1992, emend. Shiratori, Yokoyama & Ishida 2014

Type species
- Abollifer prolabens Vørs 1992

Species
- A. prolabens; A. globosus

Genus of heterotrophic marine flagellates

Abollifer is a genus of marine heterotrophic flagellates. It is an imbricate and contains two species.

== Characteristics ==
Abollifer is a heterotrophic marine flagellate that can both glide and floate. One long trailing flagellum is present, additionally, it may or may not present another short trailing or beating flagellum. The flagella emerge from a deep subapical flagellar pit which a short ventral groove connects to and a row of microtubules line the anterior side of it. The flagellar pit has a rim which is swollen like the lapel of a coat. Large fibrous material are seen near the basal bodies, which are parallel. Naked cells but with rigid surface are present. Just beneath the plasma membrane, simple globular extrusomes can be seen. Golgi apparatus and microbodies can be found.

== Etymology ==
The name "Abollifer" comes from "abollifer" in Latin, which means wearing a heavy coat. This is because of the flagellar pit's appearance.

== Taxonomy ==
The genus Abollifer was described in 1992, along with the species Abollifer prolabens. It was assigned as Protista incertae sedis. In 2014, a second species named Abollifer globosa was described, and Abollifer was recovered in the imbricate order Marimonadida. A. globosa should be corrected to Abollifer globosus. In 2018, Abollifer was assigned to a new family Abolliferidae which also contained the genus Cowlomonas. It was also proposed that Abolliferidae probably also contained the genus Heterochromonas.

== Phylogeny ==
The result of a phylogenetic analysis in 2026 found that Abolliferidae was the most basal Marimonadida group. Out of the two genera of Abolliferidae, only Abollifer was used in the analysis.

- Marimonadida
  - - - Auranticordidae
      - Pseudopirsoniidae (paraphyletic)
    - Cyranomonadidae
  - Abolliferidae
