= Belonastrum =

Scientific classification
- Domain: Eukaryota
- Clade: Diaphoretickes
- Clade: SAR
- Clade: Stramenopiles
- Phylum: Gyrista
- Subphylum: Ochrophytina
- Class: Bacillariophyceae
- Order: incertae sedis
- Genus: Belonastrum (Lemmermann) Round & N.I.Maidana, 2001

Genus of algae

Belonastrum is a genus of diatom with uncertain classification.

Species:

- Belonastrum berolinense (Lemmermann) Round & Maidana
