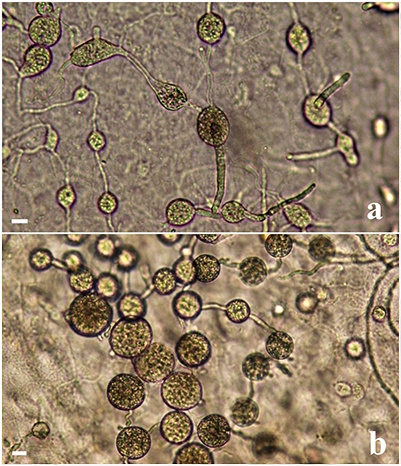
- Hyphochytrium catenoides

Scientific classification
- Domain: Eukaryota
- Clade: Sar
- Clade: Stramenopiles
- Clade: Pseudofungi
- Phylum: Hyphochytriomycota
- Class: Hyphochytridiomycetes
- Order: Hyphochytriales
- Family: Hyphochytriaceae; A.Fisch. (1892)

= Hyphochytriaceae =

Family of pseudofungi

Hyphochytriaceae is a polycentric and endobiotic family in the order of Hyphochytriales.
