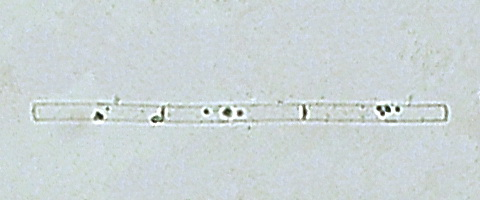
- Leptocylindrus danicus

Scientific classification
- Domain: Eukaryota
- Clade: Sar
- Clade: Stramenopiles
- Division: Ochrophyta
- Clade: Bacillariophyta
- Class: Leptocylindrophyceae
- Order: Leptocylindrales
- Family: Leptocylindraceae
- Genus: Leptocylindrus; Cleve, 1889

Type species
- Leptocylindrus danicus Cleve

= Leptocylindrus =

Genus of algae

Leptocylindrus is a genus of diatoms belonging to the family Leptocylindraceae. They are long, cylindrical diatoms that are made up of multiple cells in a line (described as a chain). These cells have chloroplast to allow it to produce energy through photosynthesis by taking in sunlight and carbon dioxide to create sugars. the cells are attached at the cell walls called valves, the cell wall is slightly concave on one side and convex on the other so that the other cell wall attached will fit together.

== Reproduction ==
Leptocylindrus reproduction is both asexual and (in some species) sexual. For the specific species Leptocylindrus danicus, it goes through sexual reproduction when its cells are between 3 and 8 micrometers in width (cells above this width go through asexual reproduction). It begins with Leptoclindrus cells splitting into two uneven gametangia. The female gametangia are longer and more brightly colored cell than the male gametangia. Then the process of meiosis occurs, where gametes are produced in the gametangia, the male gametangium (also known as the spermatogonangium) burst to release quadriflagellate spermia, which divide into biflagellate sperma and again into unflagellate sperm (or just sperm), this process takes about twelve hours to complete. After meiosis the female gametangium (or egg) bends at an angle so that the sperm can attach and enter the egg. the site of entry by the sperm starts to swell as the cytoplasm is sent to the area. after fertilization the auxospore forms at this site, the cytoplasm then contracts and valves (distinct halves of the cell wall) form to create the resting spore. these resting spores finally separate from the parent cell and can remain dormant for long periods because of their thick walls. The whole process in total takes about 36 hours to complete. The resting spores under good conditions well then germinate and then well shed there old valves to form a chain with a maximum width of 14 micrometers, and will reproduce asexually until it is between a width of 3 to 8 micrometer where the process begins again.

When Leptocylindrus danicus, and another species Leptocylindrus aporus (which can't reproduce sexually), goes through asexual reproduction by separating to form two distinct halves of different sizes. After sexual and asexual reproduction, the cell wall is soft and halves individually reconstruct themselves. The soft cell wall expands as it matures and eventually forms a silica shell.

The reproduction rate for Leptocylindrus slows or is halted when conditions are unfavorable. these unfavorable conditions include a depleted environment of the elements silicon and nitrogen, and an environment that is above 16 degrees Celsius and below 10 degrees (sexual reproduction seldom happening above 20 degrees). Therefore Leptocylindrus will usually be found reproducing in a nitric rich warm body of water.

== Habitat ==
Leptoclindrus are widely found in many coastal and shelf waters around the world with the exception of extreme polar climates, as species can't survive below 5 degrees Celsius. They are most abundant seasonally in late spring and summer in European seas to the north (abundant in fjords of Norway in summer months), and autumn (and sometimes in parts of spring) around the southern china sea. Leptocylindrus also prefer nitric rich environment because it allows for favorable conditions for sexual reproduction.

The genus Leptocylindrus is one of the most numerically dominant diatoms in the ocean and is a major component of the spring bloom period in southeastern Australia. Leptocylindrus also differ in make up depending on the habitat and environment; for example, it has been observed that there is significant dissimilarity in the composition of the Leptocylindrus microbiome (at the Operational Taxonomic Unit level (OTU)) between Leptocylindrus strains from differing locations along the east coast of Australia, with a higher diversity and more unique OTUs associated with Leptocylindrus strains isolated from the more northern locations compared to those from the south. Different regions harbor distinct bacterial communities.

== Transposable Elements (TE) ==
Transposable Element (TE, transposon, or jumping gene) is a DNA sequence that can change its position within a genome, sometimes creating or reversing mutations and altering the cell's genetic identity and genome size. Transposition often results in duplication of the same genetic material. TE-related sequences appear to play a role in the adaptation to cold conditions with regard to leptocylindrus, but they may get quieted when the cells remain for a long period in the same environmental conditions. Leptocylindrus play an important role of TEs in the generation of the phenotypic plasticity that can lead to genetic diversity and ultimately to the success of diatoms under different and variable environmental conditions.

== Symbiosis of Solenicola-Leptocylindrus ==
Symbiosis is a term describing any relationship or interaction between two dissimilar organisms. The specific kind of symbiosis depends on whether either or both organisms benefit from the relationship.

The consortium of Solenicola-Leptocylindrus is widespread from polar to equatorial zones, from coastal to oceanic water, and often reaches high abundance. The most accepted view is that Solenicola is a highly adapted epizoic or parasitic organism; other speculations are that Solenicola is a stage of the diatom life cycle.

The diatom is a widespread species in the world ocean and several studies have investigated its morphology using scanning electron microscopy. The frustule possesses an unusual double-layered structure. Transmission electron microscopy revealed that the frustule was nearly empty and that the protoplasm with mitochondria occupied a very small part of the cell. However, it is uncertain whether the mitochondria belonged to Solenicola or the diatom.

The parasitism requires the occurrence of a free-living host to be colonized or infected by Solenicola. However, there is no evidence of living individuals of Leptocylindrus mediterraneus. A mutualistic symbiosis requires a benefit for the diatom, but apparently Leptocylindrus mediterraneus is not alive when colonized by Solenicola. Therefore, there is weak symbiosis and can be concluded that the molecular phylogeny that Leptocylindrus mediterraneus should no longer belong to the genus.

== Species ==
Species:

- Leptocylindrus adriaticus B.Schröder
- Leptocylindrus aporus (F.W.French & Hargraves) D.Nanjappa & A.Zingone
- Leptocylindrus belgicus Meunier
- Leptocylindrus convexus D.Nanjappa & A.Zingone
- Leptocylindrus curvatulus Skvortsov
- Leptocylindrus curvatus Skvortsov
- Leptocylindrus danicus Cleve
- Leptocylindrus hargravesii D.Nanjappa & A.Zingone
- Leptocylindrus mediterraneus (H.Peragallo) Hasle
- Leptocylindrus minimus Gran C
