= Phycomycetes =

Obsolete polyphyletic taxon for certain fungi with nonseptate hyphae

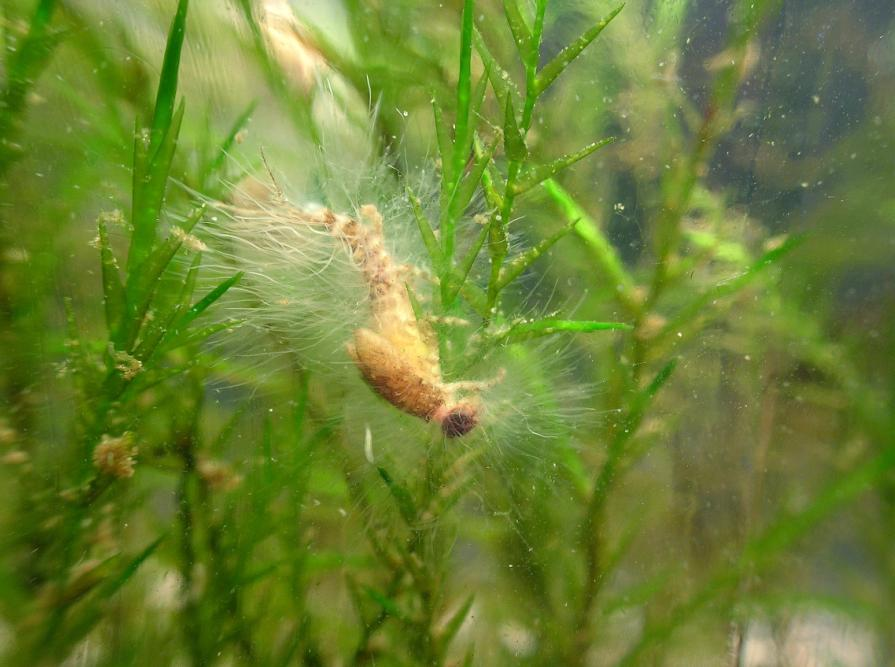

Phycomycetes or algal fungi is an obsolete polyphyletic taxon for certain fungi with aseptate hyphae. It is used in the Engler system. Asexual reproduction takes place by zoospores (motile) or by Aplanospores (non-motile). These spores are endogenously produced in sporangium. A zygospore is formed by fusion of two gametes. These gametes are similar in morphology (isogamous) or dissimilar (anisogamous or oogamous).

The class Phycomycetes has been abolished and in its place exist Zygomycetes, Chytridiomycetes, Plasmodiophoromycetes, Hyphochytridiomycetes, Trichomycetes (including Harpellales, Asellariales, Eccrinales and Amoebidiales) and Oomycetes. Still, "Phycomycetes" can be used to refer to all the above-mentioned classes as a whole.

The members of this group are found in aquatic habitats and on decaying wood in moist and damp places or as obligate parasites on plants. The mycelium is aseptate and coenocytic. Asexual reproduction by zoospore or by aplanospore. A zygospore is formed by the fusion of two gametes. Examples are Mucor, Rhizopus, Albugo, Saprolegnia.

== See also ==
- Fungus-like organisms
- Mastigomycotina
