= Gyromastigidae =

Scientific classification
- Domain: Eukaryota
- Supergroup: Rhizaria
- Phylum: Cercozoa
- Subphylum: Filosa
- Class: Imbricatea
- Order: Thaumatomonadida
- Family: Gyromastigidae; Doweld 2021

Type genus
- Gyromastix Doweld 2021 pro Peregrinia Cavalier-Smith in Howe et al. 2011

Genera
- Gyromastix; Gyromitus

Diversity
- 4 species

Synonyms
- "Peregriniidae" Cavalier-Smith in Howe et al. 2011

Family of protists

Gyromastigidae, formerly known as Peregriniidae, is a family of thaumatomonads. Their members are known to have oval two-tiered body scales. It contains four species across two genera. Their sister group is Esquamulidae.

== Characteristics ==
Gyromastigidae members are thaumatomonads that have oval two-tiered body scales. They are distinguished from Thaumatomastix because of the absence of spine scales and flagellar scales. Gyromitus have scales that are symmetric ovals and present alongside heavily outturned upper and lower rims. However, asymmetric ovals are present in Gyromastix, alongside concave to flat lower surface and convex upper surface that have rims more strongly laterally inrolled than at the ends. The ventral flagellar pit being apical and not subapical, or cells so amoeboid so they are lacking a defined shape and flagella are not clearly differentiating into anterior and posterior distinguishes them from Thaumatomonas. It is unknown if there is flagellar gliding, unlike Thaumatomonadidae. Locomotion by swimming or slow amoeboid creeping.

== Taxonomy ==
The family Peregriniidae was described in 2011. It was placed in the order Thaumatomonadida, and contained two genera: Gyromitus and the new Peregrinia. Gyromitus limax was recombined as Peregrinia limax. In 2021, because that the name Peregrinia was preoccupied by a fish genus, a new genus name Gyromastix was proposed to replace it, and the family Peregriniidae was replaced with the family Gyromastigidae. Gyromastigidae contains four species.

== Phylogeny ==
Result of two phylogenies in 2012:

- Thaumatomonadida
  - Thaumatomonadidae
  - - Gyromastigidae
    - Esquamulidae

Result of a phylogeny in 2014:

- Placoperla
  - Thaumatomonadidae
  - - - Gyromastigidae
      - Esquamulidae
    - - MF1
      - Spongomonadida
