= Mastigomycotina =

Scientific classification
- Kingdom: Fungi
- Division: Eumycota
- Subdivision: Mastigomycotina Ainsworth and Bisby, 1971

Classes
- Chytridiomycetes; Hyphochytridiomycetes; Oomycetes

Former subdivision of fungi

Mastigomycotina is a former polyphyletic taxonomic grouping, a subdivision, of fungi, similar to Phycomycetes, and that included the zoosporic classes Chytridiomycetes, Hyphochytriomycetes, Plasmodiophoromycetes and Oomycetes.

General features of Mastigomycotina:

- They produce flagellated cells during their lifetime.
- May bear rhizoids.
- Mostly, filamentous and having coenocytic mycelium.
- Show centric nuclear division.
- Perfect state of spores is typically oospores.

== See also ==
- Fungus-like organisms
