= Pseudopirsonia =

Scientific classification
- Domain: Eukaryota
- Clade: Sar
- Clade: Rhizaria
- Phylum: Cercozoa
- Subphylum: Filosa
- Class: Imbricatea
- Order: Marimonadida
- Family: Pseudopirsoniidae; Cavalier-Smith in Cavalier-Smith, Chao & Lewis 2018
- Genus: Pseudopirsonia; Kühn, Medlin & Eller 2004

Type species
- Pseudopirsonia mucosa (Drebes 1996) Kühn & Eller 2004 in Kühn, Medlin & Eller 2004

Species
- P. mucosa; P. chaetoceri

Genus of single-celled parasitoids

Pseudopirsonia is a genus of single-celled marine parasitoids of diatoms. It was described in 2004 from the species P. mucosa, previously assigned to the genus Pirsonia. Despite the similarities in the life cycle with Pirsonia, a stramenopile, Pseudopirsonia is a distantly related cercozoan.

== Description ==
Species of Pseudopirsonia are obligate parasitoid nanoflagellates that infect marine diatoms. Each cell has two flagella and an apical "nose".

== Ecology ==
Pseudopirsonia species infect marine diatoms. The type species P. mucosa, recorded in the North Sea, feeds on various diatoms of different genera, such as Rhizosolenia, Leptocylindrus, and Guinardia. The second described species P. chaetoceri, discovered in the coastal waters of Korea, infects only diatoms of the genus Chaetoceros.

== Taxonomy ==
The first species of Pseudopirsonia was initially identified as a member of Pirsonia, a genus of marine parasitoids within the Stramenopiles. Through the first molecular analyses of Pirsonia, published in 2004, it was revealed that Pirsonia mucosa was incertae sedis within order Cercomonadida instead, and this genus was established to accommodate P. mucosa. In 2011, Pseudopirsonia was assigned to a new marine order Marimonadida within the class Imbricatea and phylum Cercozoa, and in 2018 also to a separate family Pseudopirsoniidae. A second species, P. chaetoceri, was described in 2024.
