= Marimonadida =

- Phase contrast micrograph of Auranticordis quadriverberis showing flagella emerging from the groove (white arrow)

Scientific classification
- Domain: Eukaryota
- Supergroup: Rhizaria
- Phylum: Cercozoa
- Subphylum: Filosa
- Class: Imbricatea
- Order: Marimonadida; Cavalier-Smith & Bass in Howe et al. 2011

Families
- Abolliferidae; Auranticordidae; Cyranomonadidae; Pseudopirsoniidae

Order of flagellates

Marimonadida (from Latin mare 'sea' and Greek monas 'unit') is an order of marine single-celled flagellates belonging to the phylum Cercozoa.

== Etymology ==
The name Marimonadida derives from Latin mare 'sea' and Greek monas 'unit', in reference to the exclusively marine zooflagellates that compose this order.

== Description ==
Marimonadida is an order of flagellates, single-celled eukaryotes with at least two flagella used for movement. Cells of Marimonadida may move by swimming, as in the parasitoid Pseudopirsonia, or gliding, as in the free-living genera Auranticordis, Abollifer and Cyranomonas. They have only been detected in marine environments.

Although the molecular affinities between marimonads are well supported, to date there is no known morphological trait that unites them, perhaps due to insufficient knowledge on their ultrastructure. Their cytoskeletal arrangement shows some affinities with that of the related thaumatomonads and spongomonads, and are possibly a synapomorphy of their common ancestor.

== Taxonomy ==
The order Marimonadida was first described in 2011 by Thomas Cavalier-Smith and David Bass to accommodate various 'naked' flagellates (that is, without any scales or theca covering their cells) that form a clade related to cercozoan scaled flagellates and testate amoebae, namely thaumatomonads and euglyphids. Initially, it contained three genera: Pseudopirsonia, Auranticordis, and the amoeboflagellate genus Rhabdamoeba. The enigmatic Rhabdamoeba, which at the time was not genetically sequenced, was included here due to the two adhering posterior gliding flagella of its flagellated stage, similar to the four gliding flagella of Auranticordis. Eventually, Rhabdamoeba was sequenced and resolved as a member of Chlorarachnea, a different group of cercozoans that include photosynthetic amoeboflagellates.

In 2014, a species of Abollifer, a genus of previously unknown taxonomic position, was placed in the order Marimonadida based on morphological and molecular analyses. In 2016, phylogenetic analyses placed another previously unclassified genus, Cyranomonas, as a close relative to marimonads, and was later added to the order. In 2018, four families were proposed (Abolliferidae, Auranticordidae, Cyranomonadidae and Pseudopirsoniidae). The unsequenced genus Cowlomonas was proposed (not described) by Cavalier-Smith et al. as a member of Abolliferidae, as well as probably the genus Heterochromonas, which is often regarded as a possible genus of colorless golden alga.

Since its description, Marimonadida has been assigned to the class Imbricatea, which contains the euglyphid testate amoebae and the thaumatomonads, as well as an array of clades of non-scaled flagellates, such as spongomonads. However, Cercozoa-wide phylogenomic analyses have not recovered a monophyletic Imbricatea, and instead position marimonads, euglyphids and thaumatomonads intermixed with other cercozoan groups, such as cercomonads and thecofiloseans. These results are summarized in the cladogram below (uncharacterized sequences omitted):

- Filosa
  - Monadofilosa
    - - - - - Thecofilosea
            - - Thaumatomonadida (Imbricatea in part)
              - Discomonadida (Imbricatea in part)
          - - Metromonadea
            - Marimonadida (Imbricatea in part)
        - - Pediglissa
            - - - Glissomonadida (Sarcomonadea in part)
                - Pansomonadida (Sarcomonadea in part)
              - Variglissida (Imbricatea and Sarcomonadea in part)
            - Cercomonadida (Sarcomonadea in part)
          - Euglyphia (Imbricatea in part)
      - Sainouroidea (=Helkesea)
    - Paracercomonadida (Sarcomonadea in part)
  - Other filosans (granofiloseans, chlorarachneans...)
