= Chrysomerophyceae =

Scientific classification
- Domain: Eukaryota
- Clade: Sar
- Clade: Stramenopiles
- Division: Ochrophyta
- Clade: PX
- Class: Chrysomerophyceae; Cavalier-Smith 1995
- Order: Chrysomeridales; C.J.O'Kelly & C.Billard ex H.R.Preisig
- Family: Chrysomeridaceae; Bourrelly

Genera
- Antarctosaccion Delépine 1970; Chrysomeris Carter 1937; Chrysowaernella Gayral & Lepailleur 1971 ex Gayral & Billard 1977; "Giraudyopsis" Dangeard 1965 (nomen invalidum); Rhamnochrysis R.T.Wilce & Markey; Tetrasporopsis Lemmermann ex Schmidle

Class of algae

Chrysomerophyceae is a monotypic class of photosynthetic heterokont eukaryotes.

== Taxonomy ==
- Class Chrysomerophyceae Cavalier-Smith 1995
  - Order Chrysomeridales O'Kelly & Billard ex Preisig
    - Family Chrysomeridaceae Bourrelly 1957
      - Genus Antarctosaccion Delépine 1970
      - Genus Chrysomeris Carter 1937
      - Genus Chrysowaernella Gayral & Lepailleur 1971 ex Gayral & Billard 1977
      - Genus "Giraudyopsis" (nomen invalidum) Dangeard 1965
      - Genus Rhamnochrysis R.T.Wilce & Markey
      - Genus Tetrasporopsis Lemmermann ex Schmidle
