= Solenicola =

Scientific classification
- Domain: Eukaryota
- Clade: Sar
- Clade: Stramenopiles
- Phylum: Bigyra
- Class: Nanomonadea
- Order: Uniciliatida
- Family: Solenicolidae; Cavalier-Smith, 2013
- Genus: Solenicola; J. Pavillard, 1916
- Species: S. setigera

Binomial name
- Solenicola setigera J. Pavillard, 1916

Genus of marine stramenopile

Solenicola setigera is a species of marine stramenopile, and the only species classified within the genus Solenicola.

The species ranges between 4–7 μm in diameter and has a complex feeding strategy. Its ecological role within the marine planktonic food chain is generally as a grazer, feeding on photoautotrophic diatoms. It is a parasite of the species Leptocylindrus mediterraneus. S. setigera will grow on the frustule, the protective shell made of silica, of L. mediterraneus alongside the cyanobacteria Synechococcus, which it may also eat. S. setigera combines herbivorous grazing, parasitism, and predation into its survival strategy.

In 2013, the genus was placed in the family Solenicolidae.
