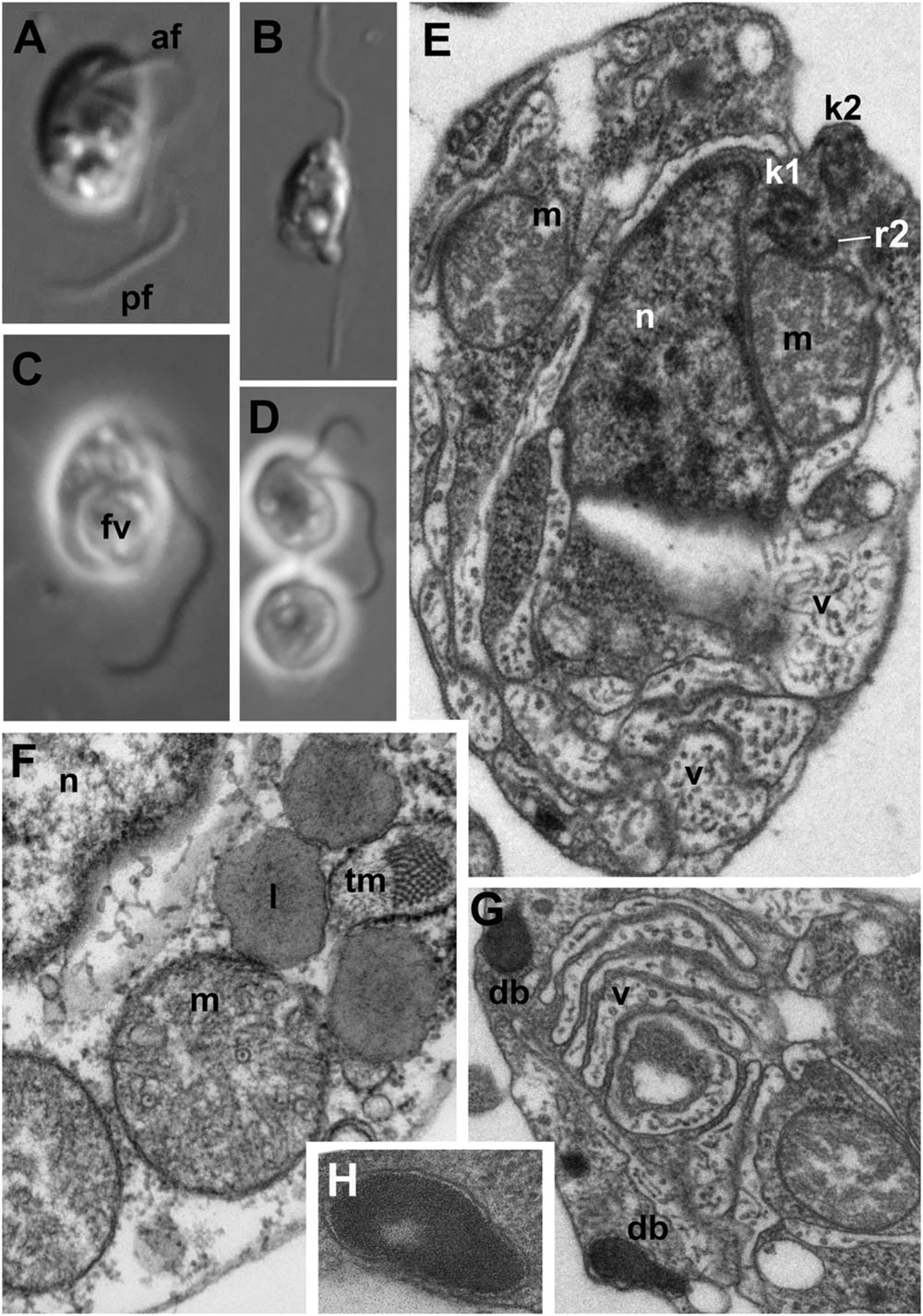
- Light and transmission electron microscopy images of Develorapax marinus

Scientific classification
- Domain: Eukaryota
- Clade: Sar
- Clade: Stramenopiles
- Clade: Pseudofungi
- Phylum: Bigyromonadea; Cavalier-Smith 1997

Classes
- Developea; Pirsonea

Synonyms
- Bigyromonada Cavalier-Smith 1997

= Bigyromonad =

Group of predatory or parasitic protists

Bigyromonads (formally known as Bigyromonadea or Bigyromonada) are a lineage of single-celled non-photosynthetic stramenopiles that contains two distinct groups: Developea, free-living phagotrophic predators, and Pirsoniales, parasitoids of diatoms.

== Description ==
Bigyromonads are single-celled protists composed of biciliate cells with two heterokont flagella. They feed on bacteria through phagotrophy. They are marine organisms.

== Taxonomy ==
- Class Developea Karpov and Aleoshin, 2016
  - Order Developayellales Doweld, 2001 [Developayellida Cavalier-Smith, 1987]
    - Family Developayellaceae Cavalier-Smith, 1997 [Developayellidae]
      - Developayella Tong, 1995
        - D. elegans Tong, 1995
      - Develorapax Karpov and Aleoshin in Aleoshin et al., 2016
        - D. marinus Karpov and Aleoshin in Aleoshin et al., 2016
  - Cubaremonas Tikhonenkov, Cho, and Keeling in Cho et al., 2022
    - C. variflagellatum Tikhonenkov, Cho, and Keeling in Cho et al., 2022
  - Develocanicus Tikhonenkov, Cho, Mylnikov, and Keeling in Cho et al., 2022
    - D. komovi Tikhonenkov, Cho, Mylnikov, and Keeling in Cho et al., 2022
    - D. vyazemskyi Tikhonenkov, Cho, Mylnikov, and Keeling in Cho et al., 2022
  - Develocauda Tikhonenkov, Cho, and Keeling in Cho et al., 2022
    - D. condao Tikhonenkov, Cho, and Keeling in Cho et al., 2022
- Class Pirsonea Cavalier-Smith, 2018
  - Order Pirsoniales Cavalier-Smith, 1998 emend. Prokina et al., 2024 [Pirsoniida Cavalier-Smith and Chao, 2006]
    - Feodosia Prokina et al., 2024
      - F. pseudopoda Prokina et al., 2024
    - Koktebelia Prokina et al., 2024
      - K. satura Prokina et al., 2024
    - Bordeauxia Prokina et al., 2024
      - B. parva Prokina et al., 2024
    - Bullionia Prokina et al., 2024
      - B. fluviatilis Prokina et al., 2024
    - Family Pirsoniaceae Cavalier-Smith, 1998 emend. Prokina et al., 2024
      - Pirsonia Schnepf et al., 1990
        - P. diadema Kühn, 1996
        - P. eucampiae Kühn, 1996
        - P. formosa Kühn, 1996
        - P. guinardie Schnepf, Debres and Elbrachter, 1990
        - P. punctigerae
        - P. verrucosa Kühn, 1996
        - P. chemainus Prokina et al., 2024
      - Noirmoutieria Prokina et al., 2024
        - N. diatomophaga Prokina et al., 2024
