= Gyromitus =

Scientific classification
- Domain: Eukaryota
- Supergroup: Rhizaria
- Phylum: Cercozoa
- Subphylum: Filosa
- Class: Imbricatea
- Order: Thaumatomonadida
- Family: Gyromastigidae
- Genus: Gyromitus; Skuja, 1939

Type species
- Gyromitus disomatus Skuja 1939

Species
- G. cordiformis Skuja 1948; G. disomatus Skuja 1939

Genus of single-celled organisms

Gyromitus is a biflagellated thaumatomonad cercozoan found in fresh water. Gyromitus was first discovered in 1939, but, there is still, to this day, very little research done on this organism. The body of the organism is covered in small siliceous oval scales. The two flagella extend from an anterior depression and are used for swimming, not gliding. On occasion this organism can form pseudopods where there are breaks in the silliceous armor, on the ventral side. There are two species: Gyromitus cordiformis and Gyromitus disomatus.

== Etymology ==
Although there is no specific information on the etymology of Gyromitus in the original description, each part is a simple Greek word that is defined as follows: ‘Gyro’ means to turn or circle, likely in reference to the locomotion of the organism.

== Type species ==
The type species for the genus Gyromitus is Gyromitus disomatus Skuja.

== History of knowledge ==
Gyromitus disomatus was first identified in 1939 by Heinrich Leonhards Skuja from a freshwater environment in Latvia. He also discovered a second Gyromitus species in 1948, Gyromitus cordiformis. A third putative Gyromitus species was discovered by Hilary Belcher and Erica Swale in New Zealand in 1975. This species was named Gyromitus limax, but the species was later reclassified as Peregrinia limax by Cavalier-Smith. Another study was conducted in 1979 in fresh water environments in Ontario, Canada. This study was conducted by Kennith H. Nicholls, who believed he had found Peregrinia limax. However, of the species surveyed from six Ontario lakes none of them were a perfect match to Gyromitus limax. Although Gyromitus was found in the Ontario lakes, the identification of species remains inconclusive. The specific positions of contractile vacuoles are the defining characteristic of the species G. cordiformis and G. limax. In the 1979 study, Nicholls did not record any of the specific anatomical positions of the features he was observing and so it is difficult conclude new information about the genus from this experiment.

== Habitat and ecology ==
The original study where Gyromitus was first discovered was conducted in Latvia. This is a freshwater species that has been found in lakes in Latvia, New Zealand, Ontario, Canada, Argentina, Nigeria, and the United Kingdom.

== Description of the organism ==
Gyromitus is a heart shaped (cordiform) biflagellated free-swimming cell. It is roughly 15–20 um in length, and roughly 11–19 um in width. The exterior of the organism is covered in small oval shaped siliceous scales that are arranged in a pattern that forms armour around the entire cell. There is a small gap in the silica scales near the anterior end of the cell where on occasion pseudopods can form. The armour forms a microporous membrane that allow the diffusion of molecules smaller than 2 nm across the membrane. A cylindrical structure runs along the anterior side of the cell and is made up 4–8 pores, which allow the diffusion or engulfment of larger molecules. This organism has been observed in most instances to be barely metabolic. This organism has one standard nucleus. The mitochondria have tubular cristae. The formation of the silica scales is associated with the mitochondria and are then transported to their exterior location through transport vesicles, although the exact mechanisms for this process are still unknown. On occasion certain species of Gyromitus can form pseudopods from a small gap in the silica scales on the posterior end of the organism. The pseudopods are used for locomotion and occasionally the species can transform completely into an amoeboid form with the complete dissolution of the flagellum. The position of contractile vacuoles within the cell is a defining characterisic that can be used distinguish between Gyromitus cordiformus and Gyromitus disomatus.
