= Pseudophyllomitus =

Scientific classification
- Domain: Eukaryota
- Clade: Sar
- Clade: Stramenopiles
- Phylum: Bigyra
- Class: Eogyrea
- Order: Eogyrida
- Family: Pseudophyllomitidae; Shiratori, Thakur & Ishida 2017
- Genus: Pseudophyllomitus; Lee 2002

Type species
- Pseudophyllomitus granulatus (Larsen & Patterson 1990) Lee 2002

Species
- P. apiculatus; P. granulatus; P. salinus; P. vesiculosus

Synonyms
- Pseudophyllomitidae: Pseudophyllomitaceae Shiratori, Thakur & Ishida 2017

Genus of flagellates

Pseudophyllomitus is a genus of heterotrophic flagellates with two flagella. It contains four species previously assigned to the genus Phyllomitus, of unknown affinities. It is the only genus of the family Pseudophyllomitidae, located in the stramenopile clade MAST-6 along with the genera Mastreximonas and Vomastramonas. This clade and other clades of environmental sequences form the order Eogyrida and class Eogyrea, the sister group to the labyrinthulomycetes.

== Description ==
Pseudophyllomitus is a genus of free-living single-celled phagotrophic flagellates with two unequally sized (heterokont) flagella. It is found in freshwater and marine sediments worldwide. Like other members of the Stramenopiles, the anterior flagellum has tubular mastigonemes or hair-like extensions, and the transitional region between the flagellum and the basal body has a helical structure. Cells are flexible and sac-shaped, with the flagella inserted subapically into a pocket. They swim freely, and occasionally glide, with one flagellum directed forward anad the other trailing behind. Cells measure 7–21 μm long and 4–5.5 μm wide.

Species of Pseudophyllomitus share morphological similarities to distantly related organisms. For example, their flexibility and the structure of their trichocysts resembles the one observed in the euglenozoans Papus, Rhynchobodo, Hemistasia and Postgaardi. It is also generally similar to the alveolate Palustrimonas, except its flagella insert in separate grooves and its cells are less flexible.

== Taxonomy ==
The genus Pseudophyllomitus was described in 2002 by protistologist Won Je Lee to accommodate four species previously assigned to Phyllomitus, namely P. apiculatus, P. granulatus, P. salinus, and P. vesiculosus. The type species of Phyllomitus, P. undulans, was originally described by Samuel Friedrich Stein in 1878 as having two flagella that adhere to each other. This characteristic was used to justify the removal of all other species, which lack adherent flagella, into separate genera. Lee assigned P. granulatus as the type species of the new genus.

In 2017, a culture of Pseudophyllomitus vesiculosus was established and molecularly sequenced. A phylogenetic analysis showed that the species belongs to MAST-6, one of the clades of environmental sequences within the Stramenopiles. Several cellular characteristics observed through electron microscopy, particularly regarding the flagellar apparatus, supported its affinity with other Stramenopiles. Based on these findings, the family Pseudophyllomitidae (under the zoological code) or Pseudophyllomitaceae (under the botanical code) was established for the genus. Later in 2018, Thomas Cavalier-Smith established the order Eogyrida and class Eogyrea to contain this family and all members of the MAST-6 clade (such as Mastreximonas and Vomastramonas), as well as other MAST clades. This class, together with the labyrinthulomycetes (class Labyrinthulea), belongs to the subphylum Sagenista.

Due to the lack of molecular data and electron microscopy observations of species other than P. vesiculosus, they have uncertain taxonomic position. Based on the method of locomotion, Cavalier-Smith suggested that P. granulatus may represent a separate stramenopile genus or even family, since it sometimes glides, unlike P. vesiculosus which moves only by swimming. He also stated that P. apiculatus "is so different that it probably belongs in another genus, perhaps even order or class", without further explanation.
