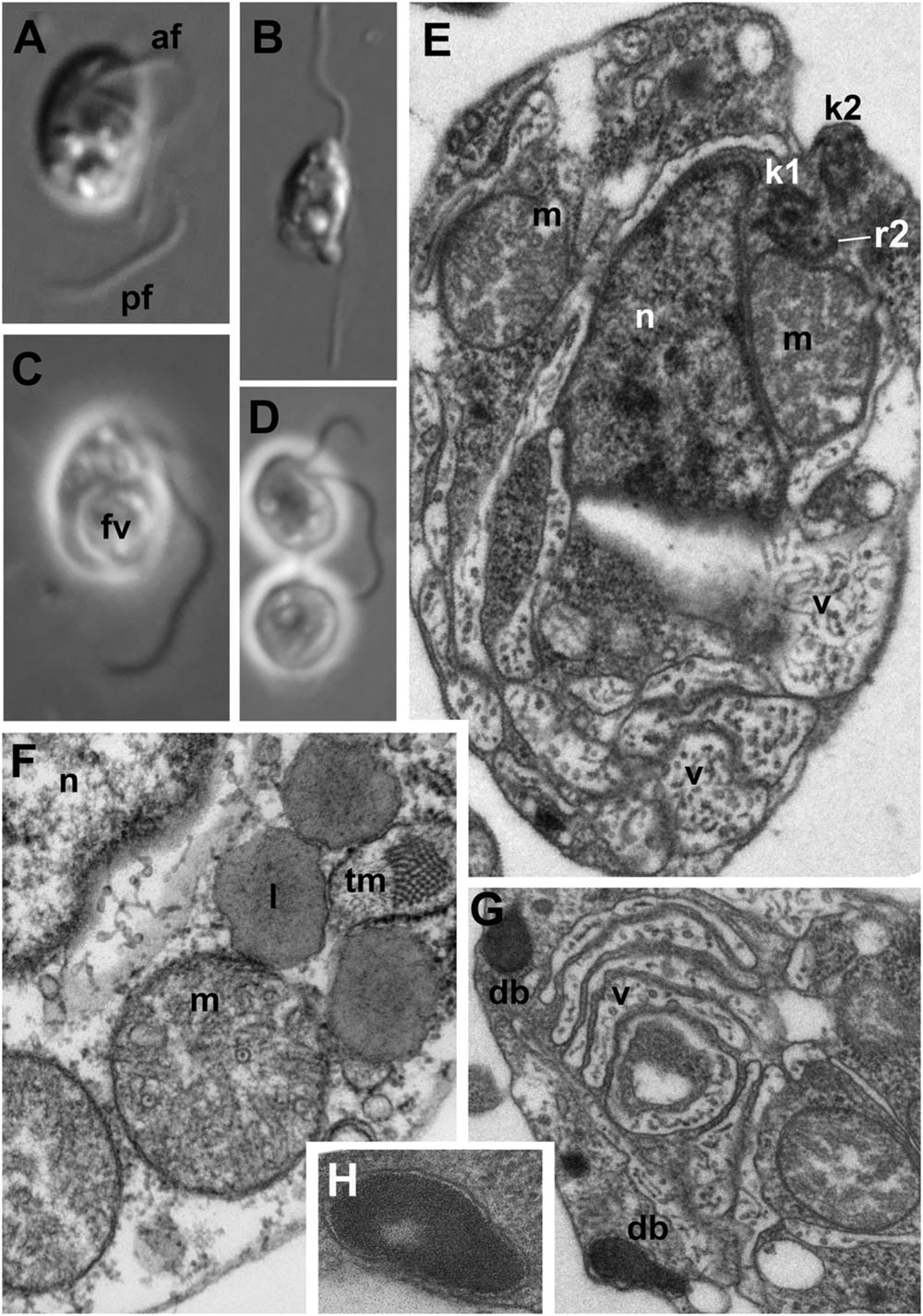
- Light and transmission electron microscopy images of D. marinus

Scientific classification
- Domain: Eukaryota
- Supergroup: Stramenopiles
- Phylum: Bigyromonadea
- Class: Developea
- Order: Developayellales
- Family: Developayellaceae
- Genus: Develorapax; Karpov and Aleoshin in Aleoshin et al., 2016
- Species: D. marinus

Binomial name
- Develorapax marinus Karpov and Aleoshin in Aleoshin et al., 2016

= Develorapax =

Genus of predatory marine flagellates

Develorapax is a genus of free-living marine flagellates containing the sole species D. marinus. It is a member of the bigyromonads, a group of marine heterotrophic stramenopiles with two flagella.

== Description ==
Develorapax marinus is a species of single-celled free-living eukaryotes. Their cells are oval in shape and measure 7–10 μm in length and 4–6 μm in width. Each cell has two heterokont (unequal in size) flagella inserted at the bottom of a pronounced depression on the right anterior side of the cell. The anterior flagellum has tubular mastigonemes (flagellar hair-like structures) arranged in a single row, and measures 1.5 times the cell length. The posterior flagellum lies along the bottom of the depression; in contrast, the anterior one emerges freely. They swim freely and do not attach to the substrate. The cells are abundant in flat or elongated vesicles that do not form an organized layer.

== Nutrition ==
Develorapax marinus is a species of eukaryovorous predators (i.e., consume other eukaryotes). They can engulf free-living bodonids. In contrast, the closely related Developayella and Mediocremonas are bacterivorous (i.e., consume bacteria). D. marinus remains the only eukaryovorous species of Developea, as all others are bacterivorous.

== Taxonomy ==
The genus and species Develorapax marinus were described in 2016 by taxonomists Sergey A. Karpov and Vladimir V. Aleoshin, from a strain of protists isolated from the littoral of the Red Sea in November 2010. The strain was cultivated under the name of Colp-4a, with Procryptobia sorokini as its prey, which in turn predated Pseudomonas fluorescens bacteria. Colp-4a was studied under microscopy and its phylogenetic position was analyzed. The results revealed morphological and genetic similarities to the species Developayella elegans, a heterotrophic stramenopile, and some key differences, such as a distinct number of microtubules in one of its flagellar roots and a different mode of nutrition. As such, the authors placed this new organism in a separate genus within the Developea. Its description was published in 2016, in a paper co-authored by Alexander P. Mylnikov, Gulnara S. Mirzaeva, and Kirill V. Mikhailov.
