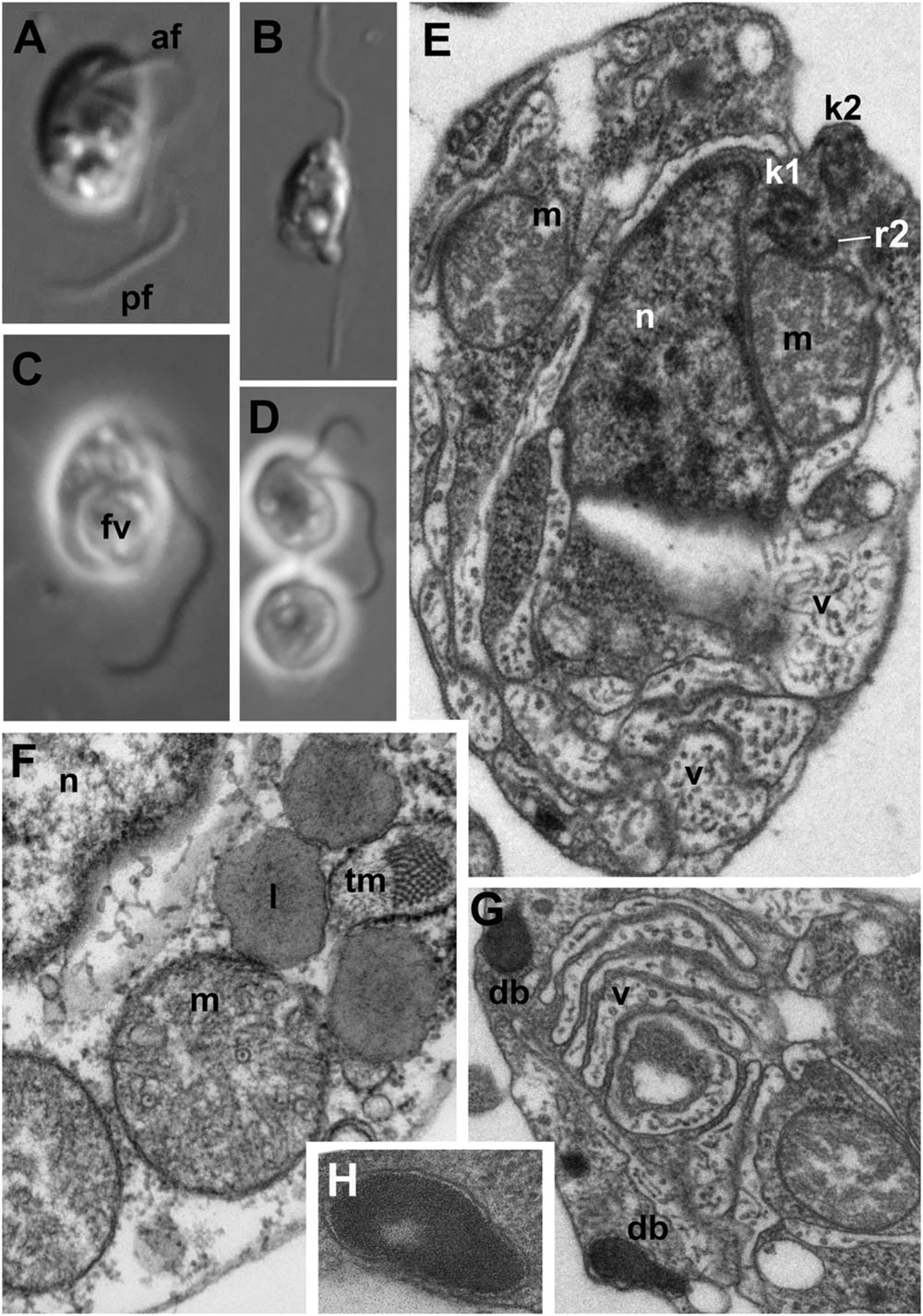
- Light and transmission electron microscopy images of Develorapax marinus

Scientific classification
- Domain: Eukaryota
- Clade: Sar
- Clade: Stramenopiles
- Phylum: Bigyromonadea
- Class: Developea; Aleoshin et al., 2016
- Order: Developayellales; Cavalier-Smith, 1997
- Family: Developayellaceae; Cavalier-Smith, 1997

Type genus
- Developayella Tong, 1995

Genera
- Cubaremonas; Develocanicus; Develocauda; Developayella; Develorapax; Mediocremonas

Synonyms
- Developea: Bigyromonadea Cavalier-Smith, 1997 sensu Cavalier-Smith, 1997; Developayellales: Developayellida Cavalier-Smith, 2018; Developayellaceae: Developayellidae Cavalier-Smith, 2018

= Developea =

Class of predatory microbes

Developeans or developayellids are a group of predatory single-celled eukaryotes. They are classified as the family Developayellaceae (or Developayellidae in zoological nomenclature), the only family in the order Developayellales (or Developayellida in zoological nomenclature) which is in turn the sole order in the class Developea, part of the stramenopiles. All known members consume bacteria as prey, except for the genus Develorapax, which consumes other eukaryotes.

== Taxonomy ==
The first known genus of developayellids, Developayella, was described in 1995. Due to many similarities shared with opalinids and heterokont algae, it was considered a member of the stramenopiles, a diverse group of protists distinguished by two unequally sized flagella, one of which has tripartite mastigonemes (hair-like structures).

In 1997, Thomas Cavalier-Smith proposed Developayella as the evolutionary link between pseudofungi and opalinids, and described higher taxon ranks to accommodate this genus: family Developayellaceae, order Developayellales, class Bigyromonadea, and subphylum Bigyromonada, in the stramenopile phylum Bigyra. The concept of 'bigyromonad' was later expanded to include the class Pirsonea, another group of phagotrophic stramenopiles.

In 2016, a second genus Develorapax was described, and the class Developea was created to accommodate both genera. In 2018, Cavalier-Smith validated the order- and family-level names for this group under zoological nomenclature: Developayellida and Developayellidae, respectively. The group was further expanded in 2020 and 2022 with the description of four new genera: Mediocremonas, Develocauda, Develocanicus and Cubaremonas.
