= Polycentric chromosome =

In genetics, a polycentric chromosome is any chromosome featuring multiple centromeres. Polycentric chromosomes are produced by chromosomal aberrations such as deletion, duplication, or translocation. Polycentric chromosomes usually result in the death of the cell because polycentric chromosomes may fail to move to opposite poles of spindle fiber during anaphase. As a result, the chromosome is fragmented, which causes the death of the cell. In some algae, such as Spirogyra, polycentric chromosomes appear normally. They also occur in the sedge, Luzula.
