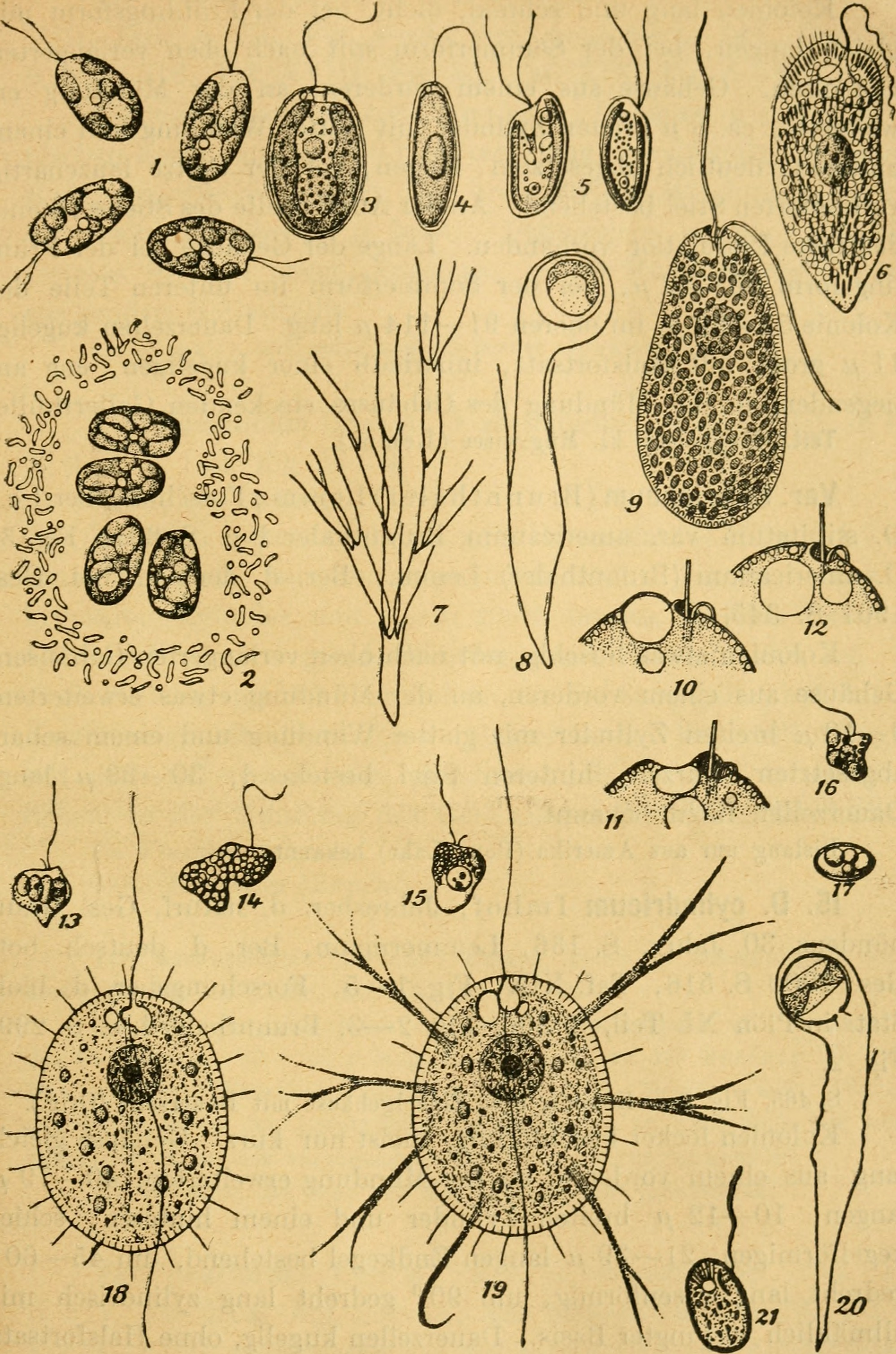
- Thaumatomastix sp. (fig. 18-19)

Scientific classification
- Domain: Eukaryota
- Clade: Sar
- Clade: Rhizaria
- Phylum: Cercozoa
- Subphylum: Filosa
- Class: Imbricatea
- Order: Thaumatomonadida
- Family: Thaumatomonadidae
- Genus: Thaumatomastix; Lauterborn, 1899

Type species
- Thaumatomastix setifera (Lauterborn 1896) Lemmermann 1908

Synonyms
- Chrysosphaerella Balonov 1980 non Lauterborn 1896; Spiniferomonas Nicholls 1984 non Takahashi 1973; Thaumatonema Lauterborn 1896 non Greville 1863

= Thaumatomastix =

Genus of single-celled organisms

Thaumatomastix is a protist genus of the order Thaumatomonadida, within the phylum Cercozoa and the class Imbricatea. Its species are aquatic, feeding on algae and appearing in waters of a wide range of temperatures and salinities, and are 15-50 micrometers long. They can interchange between flagellated and amoeboid forms, and are notable for being covered in both spiny and flattened siliceous scales.

== Etymology ==
The genus was named by Robert Lauterborn in 1899. Thauma in Greek can mean ‘miracle,’ ‘wonder,’ or ‘marvel,’ while mastix is a suffix (also Greek-derived) that can be used to mean ‘scourge’ or ‘whip,’ which may refer to the organism’s flagella.

== History of knowledge ==
The genus was first identified in 1899 by Robert Lauterborn, a German protozoologist. Since then several new species have been discovered within the genus. However, analyses of ribosomal DNA have indicated that Thaumatomastix may in fact be a paraphyletic group, and have resulted in seven species (T. formosa, T. fragilis, T. fusiformis, T. groenlandika, T. igloolica, T. spinosa, and T. splendida) being reclassified under the genus Reckertia in 2011. It has also been recently suggested that the genus be split into three separate genera, with the others being Ovaloplaca and Thaumatospina.

== Habitat and ecology ==
Thaumatomastix is found in marine and freshwater environments, over a wide range of salinities and temperatures. Though organisms may be found amidst plankton, they most often occur in sediments. Comparison of their ribosomal DNA sequences with cloned partial sequences has indicated that they can survive in suboxic or even anoxic environments. Thaumatomastix are phagotrophs, with some known to feed on algae. Many species have been primarily observed via whole mounts rather than living samples, and much about their behavior in their natural environment remains unknown. In culture, they have been noted to thrive in samples where suspended sediment particles are allowed to settle.

== Description ==
A typical organism of the genus Thaumatomastix is single-celled and heterotrophic, with a 15-50 micrometer body covered in siliceous scales and spines. The body scales can be triangular or elliptical plates, while the spines vary in length between species and are even bifurcated in the case of T. bipartita. The elliptical plates consist of two fused disks with a varying number of perforations, while the spines have three ridges and a collar-like structure near the proximal plate.

Scales are produced by silica deposition vesicles, which remain invaginated in or close to the cell’s mitochondria during their development. Once a scale is fully formed, its vesicle will move to the cell membrane to deposit it there.

Thaumatomastix are biflagellate, with one flagellum being longer than the cell itself, and move around by swimming or gliding. The two flagella emerge from a short furrow at the anterior end of the cell; the shorter one is armored by scales while the longer one is not. Though present in most species, flagella have not been observed in T. tauryanini as of 2012.

In addition to a large anterior nucleus, Thaumatomastix possess one or more vacuoles. Cylindrical structures similar to ejectosomes, contained within vesicles just below the plasma membrane, have also been observed in some species.

Thaumatomastix can produce pseudopodia from the ventral surface of their body in order to feed and will sometimes change from flagellated cells to amoeboid cells and back. As amoeboids, they possess branching pseudopodia which they can use to move across a substrate.

Many of these characteristics are shared by the closely related genus Thaumatomonas. However, Thaumatomastix differs in that it has flagellar scales and a longer anterior flagellum.

Genetic analysis suggests that Thaumatomastix is paraphyletic and may need to be divided into multiple genera. Those with oval-shaped plate scales (Ovoplaca) are closely related to another newly discovered genus, Scutellomonas, which also has oval-shaped scales but does not have spines. This does not hold true for Thaumatomastix with triangular scales, and as a result there is currently some uncertainty as to which species still belong in the genus. Based on the new proposed phylogeny, Thaumatomastix itself would be reduced to contain only the three freshwater species with triangular scales, which are distinguished by a thicker cell boundary layer than their marine relatives.

== List of species ==
Nine species are currently recognized in the genus Thaumatomastix as of 2012.

- Thaumatomastix bipartita Beech & Moestrup, 1986
- Thaumatomastix dybsoeana Thomsen, Hällfors, Hällfors & Ikävalko, 1993
- Thaumatomastix patelliformis (Takahashi & Hara) Beech & Moestrup, 1986
- Thaumatomastix punctata Thomsen ex Vørs
- Thaumatomastix sagittifera (Conrad) Beech & Moestrup, 1986
- Thaumatomastix salina (Birch-Andersen) Beech & Moestrup, 1986
- Thaumatomastix setifera (Lauterborn) Lemmermann, 1908
- Thaumatomastix thomseni Tong, 1997
- Thaumatomastix tripus (Takahashi & Hara) Beech & Moestrup, 1986
