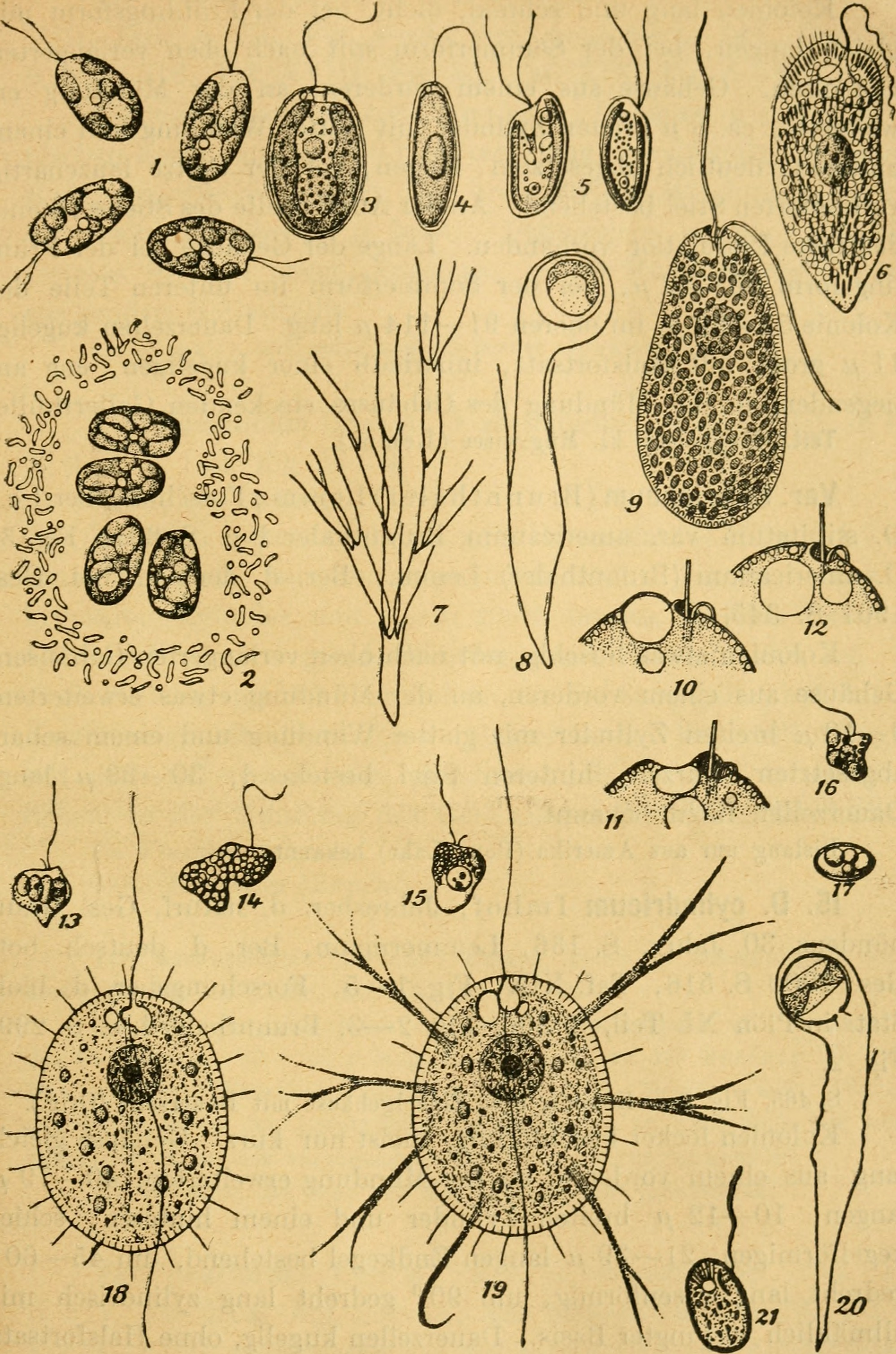
- Thaumatomastix sp. (fig. 18-19)

Scientific classification
- Domain: Eukaryota
- Clade: Sar
- Clade: Rhizaria
- Phylum: Cercozoa
- Subphylum: Filosa
- Class: Imbricatea
- Order: Thaumatomonadida; Shirkina, 1987

Families
- Esquamulidae; Peregriniidae; Thaumatomonadidae

= Thaumatomonadida =

Order of single-celled organisms

Thaumatomonadida is an order of flagellates.

== Taxonomy ==
Order Thaumatomonadida Shirkina 1987

- Family Esquamulidae Shiratori, Yabuki & Ishida 2012
  - Genus Esquamula Shiratori, Yabuki & Ishida 2012
  - Genus Cowlomonas Scoble & Cavalier-Smith 2014
- Family Peregriniidae Cavalier-Smith 2011
  - Genus Gyromitus Skuja 1939
  - Genus Peregrinia Cavalier-Smith 2011 non Vorobyeva & Lebedev 1986
- Family Thaumatomonadidae Hollande 1952 [Thaumatomastigidae Vørs 1992; Thaumatomastigaceae Patterson & Zölffel 1991]
  - Genus Allas Sandon 1927
  - Genus Hyaloselene Skuja 1956
  - Genus Thaumatomastix Lauterborn 1899 [Chrysosphaerella Balonov 1980 non Lauterborn 1896; Spinifermonas Nicholls 1984; Thaumatonema Lauterborn 1896]
  - Genus Thaumatospina Scoble & Cavalier-Smith 2014
  - Genus Scutellomonas Scoble & Cavalier-Smith 2014
  - Genus Ovaloplaca Scoble & Cavalier-Smith 2014
  - Genus Reckertia Conrad 1920 emend. Cavalier-Smith 2011
  - Genus Thaumatomonas de Saedeleer 1931
