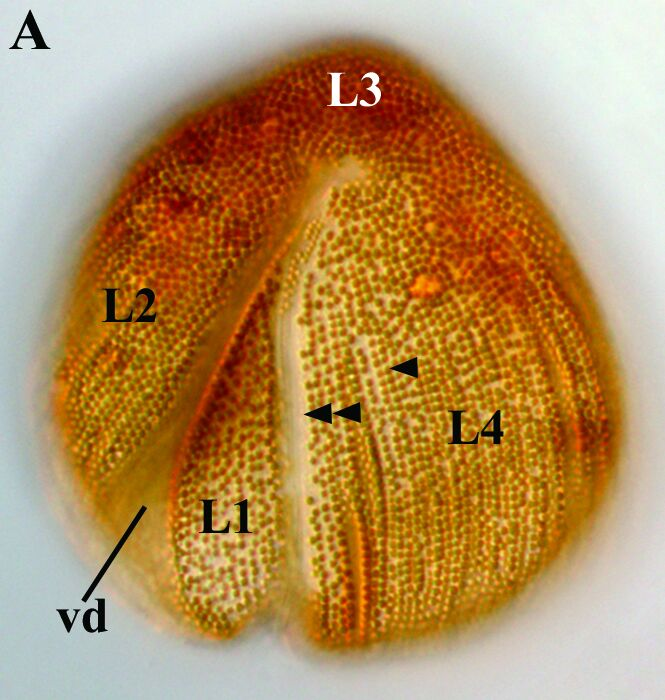

Scientific classification
- Domain: Eukaryota
- Supergroup: Rhizaria
- Phylum: Cercozoa
- Subphylum: Filosa
- Class: Imbricatea
- Order: Marimonadida
- Family: Auranticordidae
- Genus: Auranticordis; Chantangsi, Esson & Leander 2008
- Species: A. quadriverberis

Binomial name
- Auranticordis quadriverberis Chantangsi, Esson & Leander 2008

= Auranticordis =

Genus of single-celled organisms

Auranticordis is a genus of rare tetraflagellate protists within the phylum Cercozoa. Currently there is only one characterized species within this genus: Auranticordis quadriverberis. Auranticordis cells are heart shaped and can range from 35 - 75 μm long and 25 - 70 μm wide. These cells move in a forward gliding motion, and are predators in interstitial marine sand habitats.

Auranticordis cells contain several features that are unique and dissimilar from other cercozoans, such as black bodies, reduced acristate mitochondria (both features that may indicate a preference to a semi-anoxic habitat), putative primary endosymbionts, many orange pigmented extrusomes and the absence of permanently condensed chromosomes.

== Etymology ==
The heart-like cell shape and orange colouration of Auranticordis quadriverberis are the basis for the genus name. The latin words aurantium and cordis mean "orange" and "heart", respectively.

== History ==
Currently, there is only one defined species with the genus Auranticordis: A. quadriverberis. It was first discovered and characterized in 2008 by Chantangsi, Esson & Leander while completing a project focused on characterizing cercozoan diversity in British Columbia, Canada, and has since never been further investigated. This is likely due to the fact that Auranticordis quadriverberis is low in abundance and difficult to find, with only 65 cells isolated thus far. Additional species within this genus have not yet been discovered.

== Habitat ==
Auranticordis has only been isolated and characterized from marine sand samples collected at Spanish Banks, British Columbia, a sandy tidal flat located on the southern shore of English Bay, BC. Metabarcoding and environmental sequencing data from a variety of studies (data provided by the Global Biodiversity Information Facility) indicates that Auranticordis may be a cosmopolitan species however no further Auranticordis individuals have been isolated.

The current known habitat of Auranticordis, based on the type species, are benthic environments, specifically interstitial marine sand. Evidence of this is both provided by its discovery in marine sand samples, and the presence of muciferous bodies (a type of extrusome) on the external surface of the cell which may aid in allowing Auranticordis cells to adhere to sand by producing a sticky substance. Seasonality of Auranticordis is currently unknown due to limited research available. A. quadriverberis has only been observed and isolated in the months of March and May 2007.

It is currently unknown whether or not Auranticordis is a purely heterotrophic species, consuming other microorganisms as food, or whether or not it may photosynthesize as well. Auranticordis is likely predatory and feeds on bacteria based on observed ingested bacteria within the cell, however the exact method of feeding is unknown. Predators of Auranticordis are currently unknown and it is likely that Auranticordis plays a minimal role in the food web and nutrient cycling within marine sand environments given the low abundance of this genus.

== Description ==
=== External morphology ===
Auranticordis cells are orange in colour and large, with Auranticordis quadriverberis cells observed to be 35 - 75 μm long and 25 - 70 μm wide. Auranticordis cells do not contain a wall, are heart shaped and consist of four lobes. From the anterior to posterior end, these cells are covered in longitudinal ridges supported by microtubules. Auranticordis cells have four hair-covered flagella arranged in pairs that originate from the anterior end of the cell, lay along the ventral groove and emerge at the posterior end of the cell, allowing the cell to glide forwards. This trait is dissimilar from most cercozoans, which are typically biflagellated, with the exception of Cholamonas cyrtodiopsidis, which is another tetraflagellated cercozoan. Cells are consistently observed to be flagellated, with pseudopodia and amoeboid stages not observed. Auranticordis cells are not able to significantly alter their shape.

=== Internal ultrastructure ===
The cytoplasm of Auranticordis contains many vacuoles, Golgi bodies and lipid globules. There are a large number of small orange muciferous bodies (a type of extrusome) arranged in linear rows beneath the cell membrane visible on the surface of the cell which result in the orange colouration of Auranticordis cells. These extrusomes secrete a sticky substance called mucilage through small pores present in the grooves between the ridges on the cell surface. Similar extrusomes have been observed in Cryothecomonas armigera, however other extrusome types found commonly in cercozoans are not present in Auranticordis. The cytoplasmic components and organization of Auranticordis are similar to those of the Protaspa genus, another cercozoan lineage.

Within the cytoplasm, black inclusions are found near the anterior end of the cell. These black inclusions may be associated with a semi-anoxic lifestyle, as similar black inclusions have been noted in semi-anoxic ciliate and euglenid lineages. While most cercozoans contain mitochondria with tubular cristae, no distinct mitochondria are observed within Auranticordis cells. Instead, near the edges of the cell within the cytoplasm, structures similar to acristate mitochondria are observed. These putative mitochondria-like structures are smaller in contrast to the distinct mitochondria present among other cercozoans, and possibly could be reduced as an adaptation to a semi-anoxic environment.

Pale orange bodies are observed throughout the cytoplasm of Auranticordis cells; found more frequently near the anterior end of the cell and in variable but high numbers: 2 - 30 bodies per cell. The pale orange bodies are small, with each pale body having a diameter between 4 - 5 μm. Bound by two inner membranes, these cells bodies contain sack-like vesicles surrounding the outer membrane. The edge regions of the bodies are abundant with unstacked thylakoids, formed from the innermost membrane. The central region of each pale orange body does not contain any thylakoids, is electron dense and contains viral particles.

Auranticordis cells are uninucleate with a single large nucleus located at the anterior end of each cell. The position of the nucleus of Auranticordis is found to be associated with the basal bodies within each cell. Several nucleoli are present within the nucleus, and the chromosomes within the nucleus are not permanently condensed.

=== Putative endosymbionts ===
Auranticordis cells are found to contain many pale orange bodies which are double inner-membrane bound. Based on the ultrastructure of these endosymbionts, specifically the presence of two inner membranes with one forming unstacked thylakoids, it is possible that these bodies are primary endosymbionts and could indicate that an independent primary endosymbiosis occurred within the Auranticordis lineage. This could be similar to the endosymbiotic event which occurred in Paulinella chromatophora, another cercozoan. These pale orange bodies are likely cyanobacterial in origin, based on their ultrastructure and the existence of free living cyanobacteria which are similar in colouration.

The origin of these bodies has yet to be confirmed, however several possibilities have been theorized. The first possibility is that they are in fact cyanobacteria or eukaryotic cells with similar plastids which were engulfed and are early in the process of digestion within Auranticordis cells, however no evidence of digestion has been observed. A second possibility for the origin of these pale orange bodies is that they are secondary endosymbionts which are not permanent fixtures within Auranticordis cells but in fact, are continuously restored within the cell via kleptoplasty of a different eukaryotic cell. The third possibility for the origin and function of the pale orange bodies is that they are permanent plastids acquired via primary endosymbiosis of a free-living cyanobacterial cell.

== Molecular genetics ==
The genetics of Auranticordis are currently not well understood, however the placement of Auranticordis within Cercozoa is well supported through molecular phylogenetic analysis of small-subunit rDNA.

== Importance ==
Currently, Auranticordis has no known practical importance. If the pale orange bodies are in fact integrated plastids acquired via primary endosymbiosis, then Auranticordis cells would represent one of only three occurrences of primary endosymbiosis within eukaryotic lineages; the other two being the primary endosymbiosis that resulted in the plastids within the archaeplastids and the plastids present in Paulinella chromatophora, making it important for basic research into the evolution of symbiosis.
