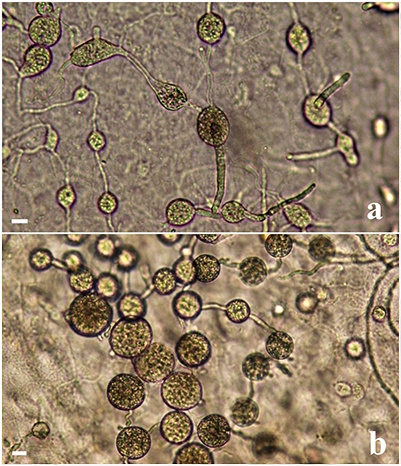
- Hyphochytrium catenoides

Scientific classification
- Domain: Eukaryota
- Clade: Sar
- Clade: Stramenopiles
- Clade: Pseudofungi
- Division: Hyphochytriomycota; Whittaker 1969
- Class: Hyphochytriomycetes; Sparrow ex Dick 1983
- Order: Hyphochytriales; Bessey 1950

Synonyms
- Phylum Hyphochytridiomycota, Whittaker 1969 orth. var.; Class Hyphochytridiomycetes Sparrow 1958 orth. var.; Class Hyphochytrea Cavalier-Smith 1986; Order Hyphochytridae Cavalier-Smith 1989

= Hyphochytriomycetes =

Group of protists

Hyphochytriomycetes are eukaryotic organisms in the group of Stramenopiles (Heterokonta).

== Characteristics ==
They are distinguished by an anterior tinsel flagellum on their zoospores. Also they have a rhizoidal or hypha-like vegetative system (hence the prefix "Hypho-").

== Classification ==
This group may be put alternatively at the phylum, class, subclass or order level, being referred to as Hyphochytriomycota, Hyphochytriomycetes (or Hyphochytrea), Hyphochytriomycetidae (or Hyphochytridae) and Hyphochytriales, respectively. The variants Hyphochytridiomycota and Hyphochytridiomycetes are also sometimes used, presumably by analogy to the Chytridiomycetes, or due to the perpetuation of a typographical error. However, the stem is Hyphochytri- (from Hyphochytrium) and not Hyphochytridi- (from Chytridium).

In the past the classes Hyphochytridiomycetes, Oomycetes and Chytridiomycetes were grouped together in the now obsolete taxon Mastigomycotina as fungi with flagellate spores or gametes. Now the Chytridiomycetes are still considered true fungi, but the other two sub-groups are classified in the kingdom Protista, or in the group Stramenopiles.

Hyphochytriomycetes are closely related to oomycetes.

Order Hyphochytriales Bessey 1950 ex Sparrow 1960

- Family Hyphochytriaceae Fischer 1892
  - Genus Canteriomyces Sparrow 1960
  - Genus Cystochytrium Ivimey Cook 1932
  - Genus Hyphochytrium Zopf 1884 [Hyphophagus Minden 1911]
- Family Rhizidiomycetaceae Karling ex Kirk, Cannon & David 2001
  - Genus Latrostium Zopf 1894
  - Genus Reessia Fisch 1883
  - Genus Rhizidiomyces Zopf 1884 [Rhizidiomycopsis Sparrow 1960]

== Diversity ==
This is a relatively small group, composed of about 16 known species, which may be due in part, to sampling methods of scientists.

== See also ==
- Hyphochytrium
- Zoospore

== Bibliography ==
- C.J. Alexopolous, Charles W. Mims, M. Blackwell et al., Introductory Mycology, 4th ed. John Wiley and Sons, Hoboken NJ, 2004. ISBN 0-471-52229-5.
- Manoharachary, C.; Sridhar, K.; et al. (2005). "Fungal biodiversity: Distribution, conservation and prospecting of fungi from India" (PDF). Current Science. 89 (1).
