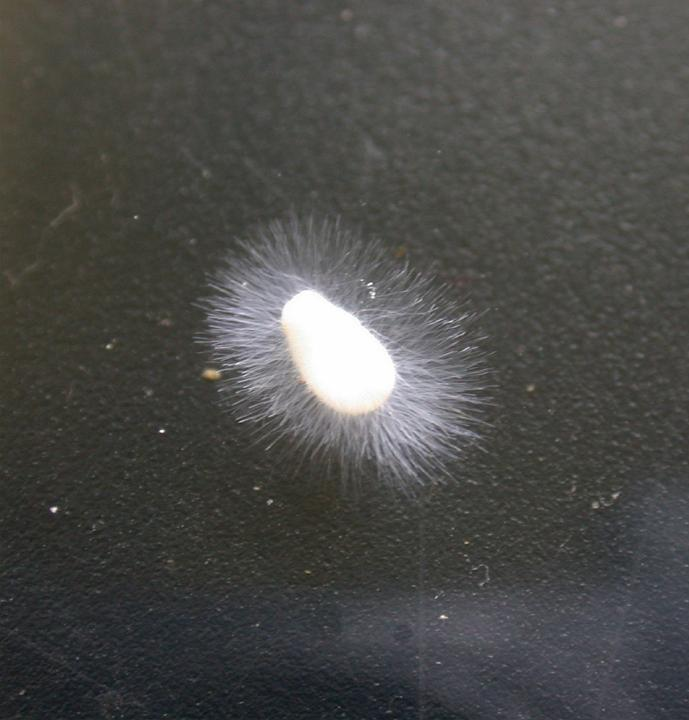
- Achlya sp. growing on a hemp seed

Scientific classification
- Domain: Eukaryota
- Clade: Sar
- Clade: Stramenopiles
- Clade: Gyrista
- Clade: Pseudofungi; Cavalier-Smith 1986

Groups
- Oomycetes; Hyphochytriomycetes

Synonyms
- Heterokontimycotina Dick 1976

= Pseudofungi =

Group of fungus-like organisms

Pseudofungi is a grouping of heterokonts, also known as the Heterokontimycotina. It consists of the Oomycetes and Hyphochytriomycetes. Although numerous biochemical, ultrastructural, and genetic traits clearly place them in the heterokonts, their growth form (featuring hyphae) and mode of nutrition (osmotrophy) resemble those of fungi (which are not closely related).

== Origin and ancestors ==
It is believed that pseudofungi descend from unicellular algae among the Stramenopiles which lost their plastids. While evidence of these plastids hasn't been found, what has been proven is the existence of endosymbiotic red algae plastids. From this, a unicellular heterotroph proto-pseudofungus (probably a mushroom parasite) got its fungal genes through horizontal gene transfer, which would have led to the development of convergent fungal multicellularity, explaining why the cell wall is sometimes made of both chitin and cellulose. The group's interrelationships are as follows:

- Pseudofungi
  - (unicellular)
    Developayella
  - (multicellular)
    - Oomycetes
    - Hyphochytriomycetes
