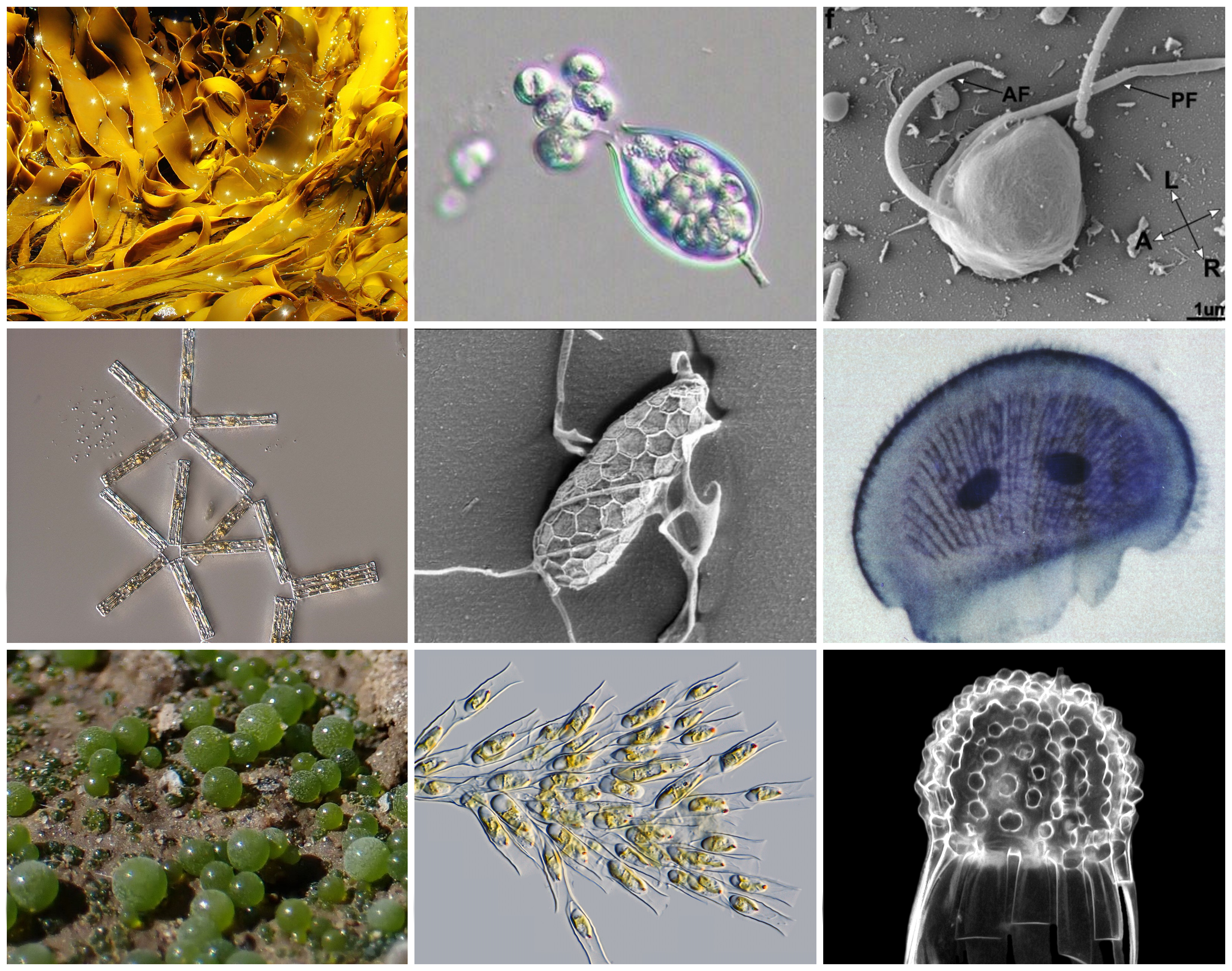
- Diversity of stramenopiles

Scientific classification
- Domain: Eukaryota
- Clade: Halvaria
- Supergroup: Stramenopiles; Patterson 1989, emend. Adl et al. 2005

Subgroups
- Bigyra; Opalozoa; Sagenista; Gyrista; Kaonashia; Ochrophyta; Pseudofungi; Oomycota; Hyphochytriomycota; Bigyromonadea; Incertae sedis; Platysulcus; Commation

Diversity
- >100,000 species

Synonyms
- Stramenopila Alexopoulos et al. 1996; Straminopiles Vørs 1993; Heterokonta Cavalier-Smith 1986; Heterokontophyta Hoek et al. 1995; Straminipila Dick 2001; Stramenipila Dick 2001, orth. var.

= Stramenopile =

Stramenopile Temporal range: Late Mesoproterozoic-present, 1025–0 Ma

Clade of eukaryotes

The stramenopiles, also called heterokonts, are protists distinguished by the presence of stiff tripartite external hairs. In most species, the hairs are attached to flagella, in some they are attached to other areas of the cell surface, and in some they have been secondarily lost (in which case relatedness to stramenopile ancestors is evident from other shared cytological features or from genetic similarity). Stramenopiles represent one of the three major clades in the SAR supergroup, along with Alveolata and Rhizaria.

Stramenopiles are eukaryotes; most are single-celled, but some are multicellular including some large seaweeds, the brown algae. The group includes a variety of algal protists, heterotrophic flagellates, opalines and closely related proteromonad flagellates (all endobionts in other organisms); the actinophryid Heliozoa, and oomycetes. The tripartite hairs characteristic of the group have been lost in some of the included taxa – for example in most diatoms.

Many stramenopiles are unicellular flagellates, and most others produce flagellated cells at some point in their lifecycles, for instance as gametes or zoospores. Most flagellated heterokonts have two flagella; the anterior flagellum has one or two rows of stiff hairs or mastigonemes, and the posterior flagellum is without such embellishments, being smooth, usually shorter, or in a few cases not projecting from the cell.

The term 'heterokont' has been used both as an adjective, indicating that a cell has two dissimilar flagella, and in the name of a taxon. The groups included in that taxon have however varied widely, creating the 'heterokont problem', now resolved by the definition of the stramenopiles.

== Nomenclature ==
The term 'stramenopile' was introduced by D. J. Patterson in 1989, defining a group that overlapped with the ambiguously defined heterokonts. The name "stramenopile" has been discussed by J. C. David. Patterson's term was formalized as a taxonomic name, Stramenopiles, in 2005 by the International Society of Protistologists. It has since been the most widely accepted name for this group of organisms. Several alternative names have been proposed since Patterson's publication, such as Straminipila, Straminopiles, and Stramenopila, which is the valid name under the PhyloCode.

=== The heterokont problem ===
The term 'heterokont' is used as both an adjective – indicating that a cell has two dissimilar flagella – and as the name of a taxon. The taxon 'Heterokontae' was introduced in 1899 by Alexander Luther for algae that are now considered the Xanthophyceae. But the same term was used for other groupings of algae. For example, in 1956, Copeland used it to include the xanthophytes (using the name Vaucheriacea), a group that included what became known as the chrysophytes, the silicoflagellates, and the hyphochytrids. Copeland also included the unrelated collar flagellates (as the choanoflagellates) in which he placed the bicosoecids. He also included the not-closely related haptophytes. The consequence of associating multiple concepts to the taxon 'heterokont' is that the meaning of 'heterokont' can only be made clear by making reference to its usage: Heterokontae sensu Luther 1899; Heterokontae sensu Copeland 1956, etc. This contextual clarification is rare, such that when the taxon name is used, it is unclear how it should be understood. The term 'heterokont' has lost its usefulness in critical discussions about the identity, nature, character and relatedness of the group. The term 'stramenopile' sought to identify a clade (monophyletic and holophyletic lineage) using the approach developed by transformed cladists of pointing to a defining innovative characteristic or apomorphy.

Over time, the scope of application has changed, especially when in the 1970s ultrastructural studies revealed greater diversity among the algae with chromoplasts (chlorophylls a and c) than had previously been recognized. At the same time, a protistological perspective was replacing the 19th century one based on the division of unicellular eukaryotes into animals and plants. One consequence was that an array of heterotrophic organisms, many not previously considered as 'heterokonts', were seen as related to the 'core heterokonts' (those having anterior flagella with stiff hairs). Newly recognized relatives included the parasitic opalines, proteromonads, and actinophryid Heliozoa. They joined other heterotrophic protists, such as bicosoecids, labyrinthulids, and oomycete fungi, that were included by some as heterokonts and excluded by others. Rather than continue to use a name whose meaning had changed over time and was hence ambiguous, the name 'stramenopile' was introduced to refer to the clade of protists that had tripartite stiff (usually flagellar) hairs and all their descendants. Molecular studies confirm that the genes that code for the proteins of these hairs are exclusive to stramenopiles.

== Characteristics ==
The presumed apomorphy of tripartite flagellar hairs in stramenopiles is well characterized. The basal part of the hair is flexible and inserts into the cell membrane; the second part is dominated by a long stiff tube (the 'straw' or 'stramen'); and finally the tube is tipped by many delicate hairs called mastigonemes. The proteins that code for the mastigonemes appear to be exclusive to the stramenopile clade, and are present even in taxa (such as diatoms) that no longer have such hairs.

Most stramenopiles have two flagella near the apex. They are usually supported by four microtubule roots in a distinctive pattern. There is a transitional helix inside the flagellum where the beating axoneme with its distinctive geometric pattern of nine peripheral couplets around two central microtubules changes into the nine-triplet structure of the basal body.

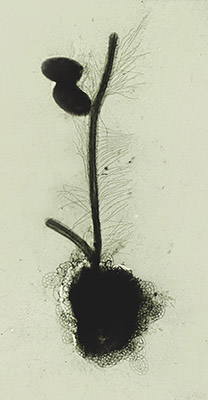
Transmission electron micrograph of Paraphysomonas butcheri. It illustrates the stramenopile property of having stiff hairs. The hairs attach to one longer flagellum, the other is without hairs. The body is coated with delicate scales. Paraphysomonas feeds on bacteria, two of which lie near the hairy flagellum.

Schematic drawing of Cafeteria roenbergensis (a heterotrophic bicosoecid), a common bacterivore in marine ecosystems: the anterior flagellum is tripartite and covered with hairs (mastigonemes); the posterior flagellum is without hairs.

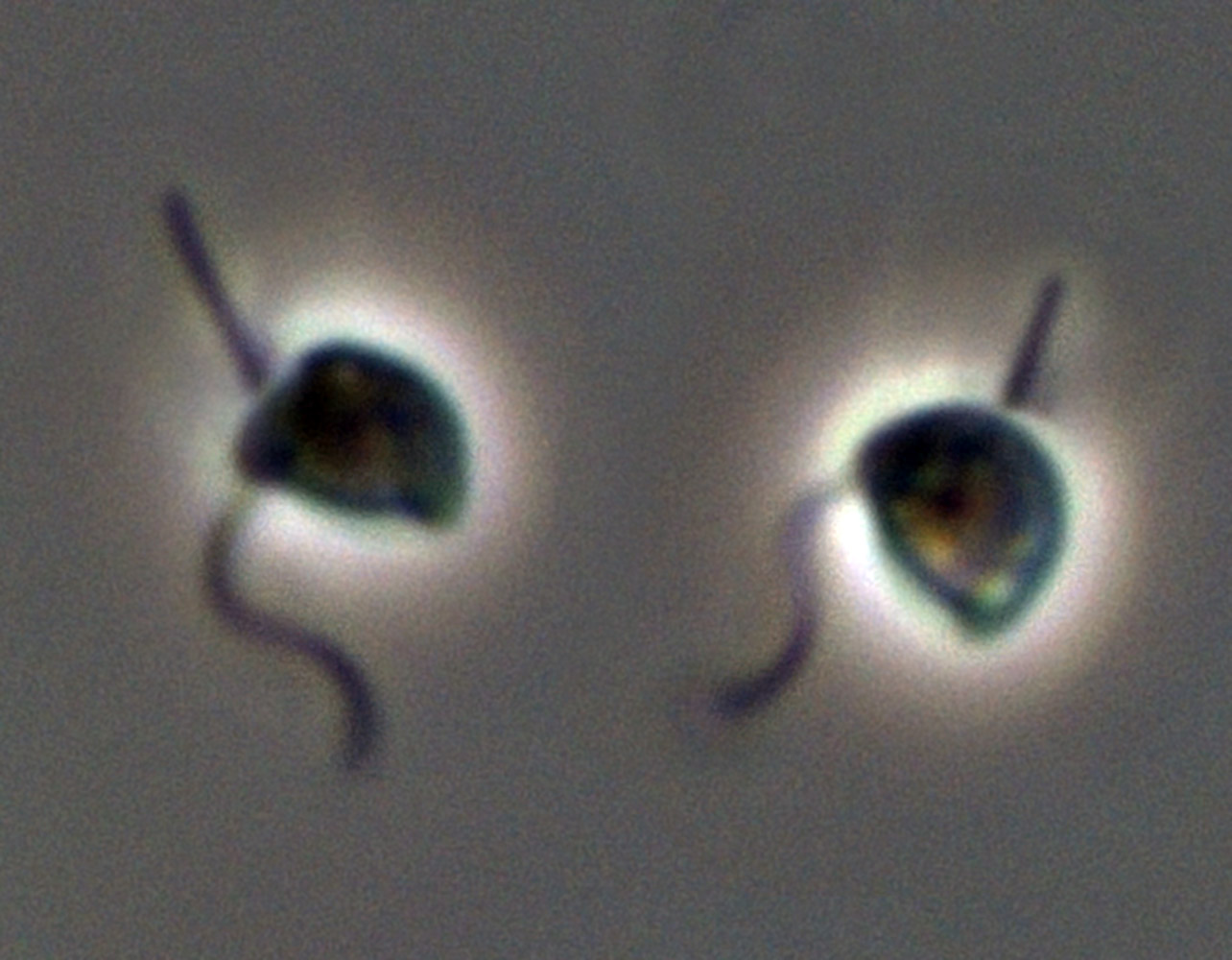
Two living C. roenbergensis. Light micrograph. The cells are about 6 µm long. The anterior flagellum beats with an undulating pattern, the posterior (recurrent or smooth) flagellum usually holds the cell to the substrate.

=== Plastids ===
Unlike other stramenopiles, ochrophytes possess plastids, enabling most of them to photosynthesize and produce their own food using light energy, although some have secondarily lost the ability to photosynthesize. Their plastids are coloured off-green, orange, golden or brown because of the presence of chlorophyll a, chlorophyll c, and fucoxanthin. This form of plastid is called a stramenochrome or chromoplast. (Note: They are not called chloroplasts, the most common form of photosynthetic plastid. If used narrowly, a chloroplast is a plastid which contains chlorophyll B, as in green algae, some euglenids, and the land plants.) The most significant autotrophic ochrophytes are the brown algae (wracks and many other seaweeds), and the diatoms. The latter are among the most significant primary producers in marine and freshwater ecosystems. Most molecular analyses suggest that the most basal stramenopiles lacked plastids and were accordingly colourless heterotrophs, feeding on other organisms. This implies that the stramenopiles arose as heterotrophs, diversified, and then some of them acquired chromoplasts. Some lineages (such as the axodine lineage that included the chromophytic pedinellids, colourless ciliophryids, and colourless actinophryid heliozoa) have secondarily reverted to heterotrophy.

== Ecology ==
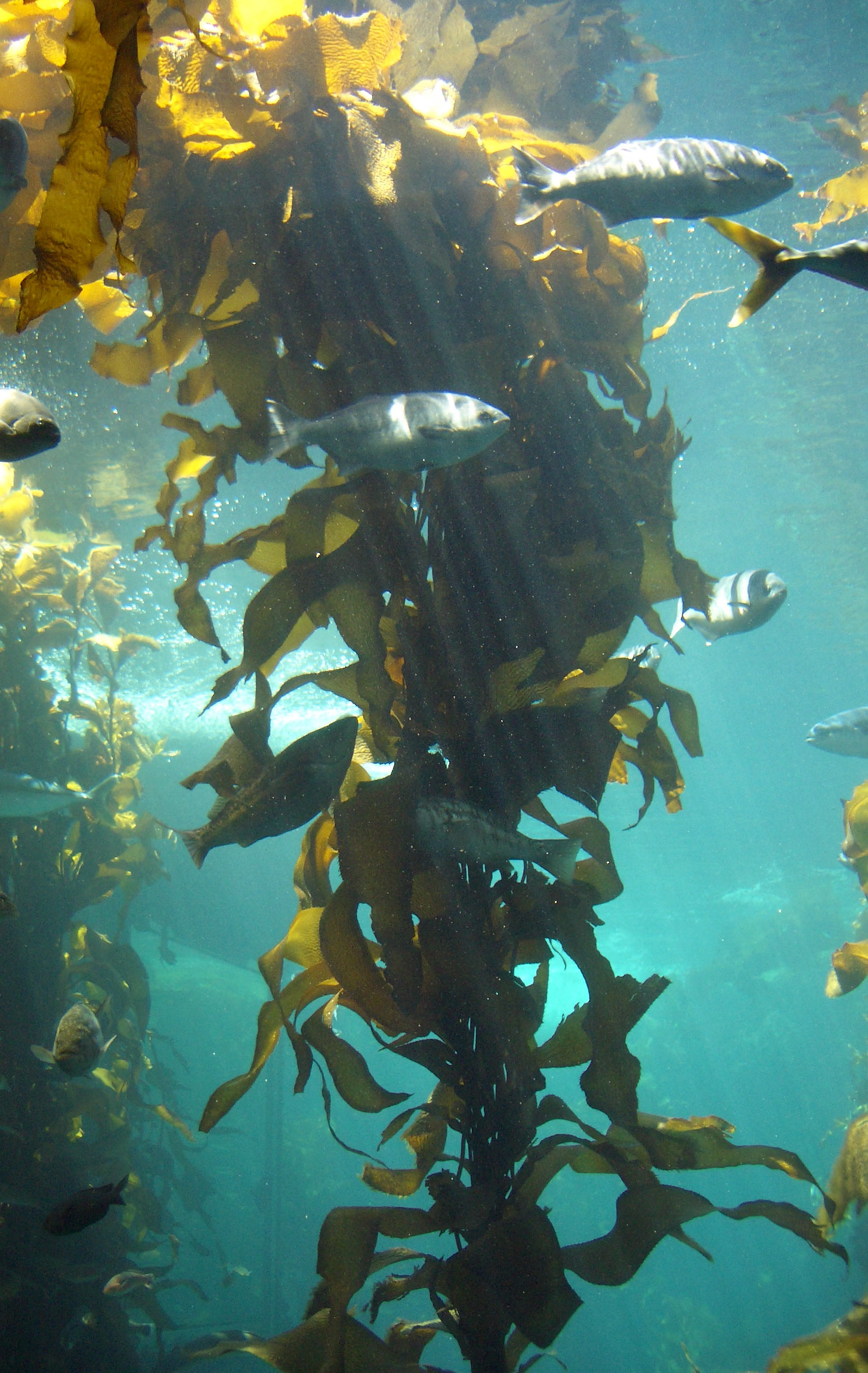
Giant kelp, Macrocystis pyrifera, an example of a multicellular stramenopile, is a large seaweed, up to 45 metres (150 feet) long, in the Phaeophyceae, within the Gyrista.

Some stramenopiles are significant as autotrophs and as heterotrophs in natural ecosystems; others are parasitic. Blastocystis is a gastrointestinal parasite of humans; opalines and proteromonads live in the intestines of cold-blooded vertebrates and have been described as parasitic; oomycetes include some significant plant pathogens such as the cause of potato blight, Phytophthora infestans. Diatoms are major contributors to global carbon cycles because they are the most important autotrophs in most marine habitats. The brown algae, including familiar seaweeds like wrack and kelp, are major autotrophs of the intertidal and subtidal marine habitats. Some of the bacterivorous stramenopiles, such as Cafeteria, are common and widespread consumers of bacteria, and thus play a major role in recycling carbon and nutrients within microbial food webs.

== Evolution ==
=== External ===
Stramenopiles are most closely related to alveolates and Rhizaria, all of which have tubular mitochondrial cristae and collectively form the SAR supergroup, whose name is formed from their initials. The ancestor of the SAR supergroup appears to have captured a unicellular photosynthetic red alga, and many stramenopiles, as well as members of other SAR groups such as the Rhizaria, still have plastids which retain the double membrane of the red alga and a double membrane surrounding it, for a total of four membranes. In addition, species of Telonemia, the sister group to SAR, exhibit heterokont flagella with tripartite mastigonemes, implying a more ancient origin of stramenopile characteristics.

- TSAR
  - Telonemia
  - - SAR
      - Rhizaria
      - Halvaria
        - Stramenopiles
        - Alveolata

=== Internal ===
The following cladogram summarizes the evolutionary relationships between stramenopiles. The phylogenetic relationships of Bigyra vary greatly from one analysis to the next: it has been recovered as either monophyletic or paraphyletic. When paraphyletic, the branching order of the bigyran groups also varies: in some studies, Sagenista is sister to the remaining lineages, while in others Opalozoa is sister to the other lineages. Nonetheless, Platysulcea is consistently recovered as the sister clade to all other stramenopiles. In addition, a flagellate species discovered in 2023, Kaonashia insperata, remains in an uncertain phylogenetic position, but more closely related to Gyrista than to other clades. A 2025 review takes it as being within Gyrista, and treats Bigyra as a possible clade.

- Stramenopiles
  - Platysulcus
  - - Bigyra
      - Opalozoa
        - Placidozoa
        - Bikosea
      - Sagenista
        - Eogyrea inc Pseudophyllomitus
        - Labyrinthulea
    - Gyrista
      - Kaonashia
      - - Pseudofungi
        - Ochrophyta
