= Taxonomy of Cercozoa =

Classification of a phylum of protists

Cercozoa (=Rhizopoda) is a phylum of protists. It was first described in 1998 by Thomas Cavalier-Smith. The phylum Cercozoa belongs to a group called Rhizaria. No specific morphological or behavioral characteristics are observed in its members. This phylum exhibits great diversity. Its members are biciliate and/or amoeboid and generally possess filopodia. Most contain tubular cristae, and cysts are common. Kinetosomes are attached to the nucleus via the cytoskeleton. Microbodies and extrusomes are generally present. This list shows the revisions made to Cavalier-Smith's Cercozoa classification and also shows Adl et al. classifications.

== Taxonomy ==
Before the phylum was described, a similar group was named as phylum Rhizopoda instead. In 1997, Rhizopoda was assigned to a superphylum named Neosarcodina that also included another phylum, the Amoebozoa. Here is a scheme from Cavalier-Smith, 1997:

- Phylum Rhizopoda
  - Subphylum Phytomyxa
    - Class Phytomyxea
      - Order Phagomyxida
      - Order Plasmodiophorida
  - Subphylum Reticulofilosa
    - Class Chlorarachnea
      - Order Chlorarachnida
    - Class Proteomyxidea
      - Order Pseudosporida
      - Order Leucodictyida
  - Subphylum Monadofilosa
    - Class Sarcomonadea
      - Order Cercomonadida
      - Order Thaumatomonadida
    - Class Filosea
      - Subclass Cristidiscoidia
        - Order Nucleariida
        - Order Fonticulida
        - Order Ministeriida
      - Subclass Cristivesiculatia
        - Order Vampyrellida
      - Subclass Testaceafilosia
        - Order Gromiida
        - Order Euglyphida

In Cavalier-Smith, 1998, the phylum was proposed as a replacement for Rhizopoda. It was placed in infrakingdom Sarcomastigota along with the phyla Neomonada, Foraminifera and Amoebozoa. Order Spongomonadida was added to subphylum Monadofilosa and cristidiscoids were transferred to subphylum Choanozoa. The classification was this:

- Phylum Cercozoa
  - Subphylum Phytomyxa
    - Class Phytomyxea
      - Order Phagomyxida
      - Order Plasmodiophorida
  - Subphylum Reticulofilosa
    - Class Chlorarachnea
      - Order Chlorarachnida
    - Class Proteomyxidea
      - Order Pseudosporida
      - Order Leucodictyida
  - Subphylum Monadofilosa
    - Order Spongomonadida
    - Class Sarcomonadea
      - Order Cercomonadida
      - Order Thaumatomonadida
    - Class Filosea
      - Subclass Cristivesiculatia
        - Order Vampyrellida
      - Subclass Testaceafilosia
        - Order Gromiida
        - Order Euglyphida

In Cavalier-Smith, 2000, a new monotypic class Spongomonadea was named for the order Spongomonadida. Spongomonadea was placed in subphylum Reticulofilosa. Order Cryomonadida was added to class Sarcomonadea. Class Athalamea was used for the families Biomyxidae and Gymnophryidae in subphylum Reticulofilosa. Class Ramicristea was used in subphylum Monadofilosa and included the orders Heliomonadida and Commatiida:

- Phylum Cercozoa
  - Subphylum Phytomyxa
    - Class Phytomyxea
      - Order Phagomyxida
      - Order Plasmodiophorida
  - Subphylum Reticulofilosa
    - Class Chlorarachnea
      - Order Chlorarachnida
    - Class Proteomyxidea
      - Order Pseudosporida
      - Order Leucodictyida
    - Class Spongomonadea
      - Order Spongomonadida
    - Class Athalamea
  - Subphylum Monadofilosa
    - Class Sarcomonadea
      - Order Cercomonadida
      - Order Thaumatomonadida
      - Order Cryomonadida
    - Class Filosea
      - Subclass Cristivesiculatia
        - Order Vampyrellida
      - Subclass Testaceafilosia
        - Order Gromiida
        - Order Euglyphida
    - Class Ramicristea
      - Order Heliomonadida
      - Order Commatiida

In Cavalier-Smith, 2002, a new subphylum named Endomyxa was introduced to contain the new class Ascetosporea and the class Phytomyxea in the phylum Cercozoa. Ascetosporea contained the orders Haplosporida and Paramyxida. Subclass Testaceafilosia was ranked as a class Testaceafilosea. Phylum Cercozoa was placed in a new infrakingdom named Rhizaria along with the phyla Apusozoa, Retaria and Heliozoa:

- Phylum Cercozoa
  - Subphylum Reticulofilosa
    - Class Chlorarachnea
      - Order Chlorarachnida
    - Class Proteomyxidea
      - Order Pseudosporida
      - Order Leucodictyida
    - Class Spongomonadea
      - Order Spongomonadida
    - Class Athalamea
  - Subphylum Monadofilosa
    - Class Sarcomonadea
      - Order Cercomonadida
      - Order Thaumatomonadida
      - Order Cryomonadida
    - Class Filosea
      - Order Vampyrellida
    - Class Testaceafilosea
      - Order Gromiida
      - Order Euglyphida
    - Class Ramicristea
      - Order Heliomonadida
      - Order Commatiida
  - Subphylum Endomyxa
    - Class Phytomyxea
      - Order Phagomyxida
      - Order Plasmodiophorida
    - Class Ascetosporea
      - Order Haplosporida
      - Order Paramyxida

In Cavalier-Smith and Chao, 2003, the subphyla Reticulofilosa and Monadofilosa were ranked as superclasses in a new subphylum Filosa. Order Heliomonadida was transferred to class Proteomyxidea, a new order Reticulosida was created to include the only family Gymnophryidae, now also containing family Biomyxidae members. A new order Metopiida was assigned to class Sarcomonadea. A new class named Thecofilosea was created to contain the order Cryomonadida and the new order Tectofilosida. A new class named Imbricatea was created to contain the orders Thaumatomonadida and Euglyphida. A new order Claustrosporida was assigned to class Ascetosporea. A new class named Gromiidea contained the only order Gromiida. Order Commatiida was not listed, and order Vampyrellida was assigned kingdom Protozoa incertae sedis.

- Phylum Cercozoa
  - Subphylum Filosa
    - Superclass Reticulofilosa
      - Class Chlorarachnea
        - Order Chlorarachnida
      - Class Spongomonadea
        - Order Spongomonadida
      - Class Proteomyxidea
        - Order Pseudosporida
        - Order Leucodictyida
        - Order Heliomonadida
        - Order Reticulosida
    - Superclass Monadofilosa
      - Class Sarcomonadea
        - Order Metopiida
        - Order Cercomonadida
      - Class Thecofilosea
        - Order Tectofilosida
        - Order Cryomonadida
      - Class Imbricatea
        - Order Thaumatomonadida
        - Order Euglyphida
  - Subphylum Endomyxa
    - Class Phytomyxea
      - Order Phagomyxida
      - Order Plasmodiophorida
    - Class Ascetosporea
      - Order Haplosporida
      - Order Paramyxida
      - Order Claustrosporida
    - Class Gromiidea
      - Order Gromiida

In Bass and Cavalier-Smith, 2004, a new order Metromonadida was placed as superclass Monadofilosa incertae sedis. Order Metopiida was removed from class Sarcomonadea and placed subphylum Filosa incertae sedis instead. Class Spongomonadea was transferred to superclass Monadofilosa:

- Phylum Cercozoa
  - Subphylum Filosa
    - Superclass Reticulofilosa
      - Class Chlorarachnea
        - Order Chlorarachnida
      - Class Proteomyxidea
        - Order Pseudosporida
        - Order Leucodictyida
        - Order Heliomonadida
        - Order Reticulosida
    - Superclass Monadofilosa
      - Class Sarcomonadea
        - Order Cercomonadida
      - Class Thecofilosea
        - Order Tectofilosida
        - Order Cryomonadida
      - Class Imbricatea
        - Order Thaumatomonadida
        - Order Euglyphida
      - Class Spongomonadea
        - Order Spongomonadida
      - Class Incertae sedis
        - Order Metromonadida
    - Superclass Incertae sedis
      - Order Metopiida
  - Subphylum Endomyxa
    - Class Phytomyxea
      - Order Phagomyxida
      - Order Plasmodiophorida
    - Class Ascetosporea
      - Order Haplosporida
      - Order Paramyxida
      - Order Claustrosporida
    - Class Gromiidea
      - Order Gromiida

In Bass et al., 2005, genus Sainouron was classified as superclass Monadofilosa incertae sedis, genera Helkesimastix and Cercobodo were also classified as subphylum Filosa incertae sedis:

- Phylum Cercozoa
  - Subphylum Filosa
    - Superclass Reticulofilosa
      - Class Chlorarachnea
        - Order Chlorarachnida
      - Class Proteomyxidea
        - Order Pseudosporida
        - Order Leucodictyida
        - Order Heliomonadida
        - Order Reticulosida
    - Superclass Monadofilosa
      - Class Sarcomonadea
        - Order Cercomonadida
      - Class Thecofilosea
        - Order Tectofilosida
        - Order Cryomonadida
      - Class Imbricatea
        - Order Thaumatomonadida
        - Order Euglyphida
      - Class Spongomonadea
        - Order Spongomonadida
      - Class Incertae sedis
        - Genus Sainouron
        - Order Metromonadida
    - Superclass Incertae sedis
      - Genus Helkesimastix
      - Genus Cercobodo
      - Order Metopiida
  - Subphylum Endomyxa
    - Class Phytomyxea
      - Order Phagomyxida
      - Order Plasmodiophorida
    - Class Ascetosporea
      - Order Haplosporida
      - Order Paramyxida
      - Order Claustrosporida
    - Class Gromiidea
      - Order Gromiida

In 2005, Adl et al. proposed a rankless hierarchy:

- Cercozoa
  - Cercomonadida
    - Cercomonadidae
    - Heteromitidae
  - Silicofilosea
    - Thaumatomonadida
    - Euglyphida
      - Euglyphidae
      - Trinematidae
      - Cyphoderiidae
      - Paulinellidae
      - Incertae sedis
        - Ampullataria
        - Euglyphidion
        - Heteroglypha
        - Matsakision
  - Chlorarachniophyta
  - Phytomyxea
  - Phaeodarea
    - Phaeoconchia
    - Phaeocystina
    - Phaeogromia
    - Phaeosphaeria
  - Nucleohelea
    - Clathrulinidae
    - Gymnosphaerida
  - Incertae sedis
    - Cryothecomonas
    - Gymnophrys
    - Lecythium
    - Massisteria
    - Metopion
    - Proleptomonas
    - Pseudodifﬂugia

In Cavalier-Smith, 2007, the order Metromonadida was assigned to its own class Metromonadea directly under subphylum Filosa and class Phaeodarea and order Metopiida were added to superclass Monadofilosa:

- Phylum Cercozoa
  - Subphylum Filosa
    - Class Metromonadea
      - Order Metromonadida
    - Superclass Reticulofilosa
      - Class Chlorarachnea
        - Order Chlorarachnida
      - Class Proteomyxidea
        - Order Pseudosporida
        - Order Leucodictyida
        - Order Heliomonadida
        - Order Reticulosida
    - Superclass Monadofilosa
      - Order Metopiida
      - Class Sarcomonadea
        - Order Cercomonadida
      - Class Thecofilosea
        - Order Tectofilosida
        - Order Cryomonadida
      - Class Imbricatea
        - Order Thaumatomonadida
        - Order Euglyphida
      - Class Spongomonadea
        - Order Spongomonadida
      - Class Phaeodarea
      - Class Incertae sedis
        - Genus Sainouron
    - Superclass Incertae sedis
      - Genus Helkesimastix
      - Genus Cercobodo
  - Subphylum Endomyxa
    - Class Phytomyxea
      - Order Phagomyxida
      - Order Plasmodiophorida
    - Class Ascetosporea
      - Order Haplosporida
      - Order Paramyxida
      - Order Claustrosporida
    - Class Gromiidea
      - Order Gromiida

In Cavalier-Smith et al., 2008, the orders Pansomonadida and Metopiida and new family Sainouridae were added to class Sarcomonadea and order Desmothoracida was added to class Proteomyxidea:

- Phylum Cercozoa
  - Subphylum Filosa
    - Class Metromonadea
      - Order Metromonadida
    - Superclass Reticulofilosa
      - Class Chlorarachnea
        - Order Chlorarachnida
      - Class Proteomyxidea
        - Order Pseudosporida
        - Order Leucodictyida
        - Order Heliomonadida
        - Order Reticulosida
        - Order Desmothoracida
    - Superclass Monadofilosa
      - Class Sarcomonadea
        - Family Sainouridae
        - Order Cercomonadida
        - Order Pansomonadida
        - Order Metopiida
      - Class Thecofilosea
        - Order Tectofilosida
        - Order Cryomonadida
      - Class Imbricatea
        - Order Thaumatomonadida
        - Order Euglyphida
      - Class Spongomonadea
        - Order Spongomonadida
      - Class Phaeodarea
    - Superclass Incertae sedis
      - Genus Helkesimastix
      - Genus Cercobodo
  - Subphylum Endomyxa
    - Class Phytomyxea
      - Order Phagomyxida
      - Order Plasmodiophorida
    - Class Ascetosporea
      - Order Haplosporida
      - Order Paramyxida
      - Order Claustrosporida
    - Class Gromiidea
      - Order Gromiida

In Bass et al., 2009, a new class named Granofilosea was added to subphylum Filosa and contained five orders: Leucodictyida, Limnofilida, Cryptofilida, Desmothoracida and Heliomonadida. A new order Paradinida was added to class Ascetosporea. Order Aconchulinida was added to class Proteomyxidea, a new family named Rhizoplasmidae was also added to the class as incertae sedis. Class Proteomyxidea was transferred to subphylum Endomyxa:

- Phylum Cercozoa
  - Subphylum Filosa
    - Class Metromonadea
      - Order Metromonadida
    - Class Granofilosea
      - Order Leucodictyida
      - Order Limnofilida
      - Order Cryptofilida
      - Order Desmothoracida
      - Order Heliomonadida
    - Superclass Reticulofilosa
      - Class Chlorarachnea
        - Order Chlorarachnida
    - Superclass Monadofilosa
      - Class Sarcomonadea
        - Family Sainouridae
        - Order Cercomonadida
        - Order Pansomonadida
        - Order Metopiida
      - Class Thecofilosea
        - Order Tectofilosida
        - Order Cryomonadida
      - Class Imbricatea
        - Order Thaumatomonadida
        - Order Euglyphida
      - Class Spongomonadea
        - Order Spongomonadida
      - Class Phaeodarea
    - Superclass Incertae sedis
      - Genus Helkesimastix
      - Genus Cercobodo
  - Subphylum Endomyxa
    - Class Proteomyxidea
      - Order Reticulosida
      - Order Aconchulinida
      - Order Pseudosporida
      - Order Incertae sedis
        - Family Rhizoplasmidae
    - Class Phytomyxea
      - Order Phagomyxida
      - Order Plasmodiophorida
    - Class Gromiidea
      - Order Gromiida
    - Class Ascetosporea
      - Order Haplosporida
      - Order Paramyxida
      - Order Claustrosporida
      - Order Paradinida

In Howe et al., 2009, a new order Glissomonadida was also assigned to class Sarcomonadea and genus Pseudopirsonia was added as superclass Monadofilosa incertae sedis:

- Phylum Cercozoa
  - Subphylum Filosa
    - Class Metromonadea
      - Order Metromonadida
    - Class Granofilosea
      - Order Leucodictyida
      - Order Limnofilida
      - Order Cryptofilida
      - Order Desmothoracida
      - Order Heliomonadida
    - Superclass Reticulofilosa
      - Class Chlorarachnea
        - Order Chlorarachnida
    - Superclass Monadofilosa
      - Class Sarcomonadea
        - Family Sainouridae
        - Order Cercomonadida
        - Order Pansomonadida
        - Order Metopiida
        - Order Glissomonadida
      - Class Thecofilosea
        - Order Tectofilosida
        - Order Cryomonadida
      - Class Imbricatea
        - Order Thaumatomonadida
        - Order Euglyphida
      - Class Spongomonadea
        - Order Spongomonadida
      - Class Phaeodarea
      - Class Incertae sedis
        - Genus Pseudopirsonia
    - Superclass Incertae sedis
      - Genus Helkesimastix
      - Genus Cercobodo
  - Subphylum Endomyxa
    - Class Proteomyxidea
      - Order Reticulosida
      - Order Aconchulinida
      - Order Pseudosporida
      - Order Incertae sedis
        - Family Rhizoplasmidae
    - Class Phytomyxea
      - Order Phagomyxida
      - Order Plasmodiophorida
    - Class Gromiidea
      - Order Gromiida
    - Class Ascetosporea
      - Order Haplosporida
      - Order Paramyxida
      - Order Claustrosporida
      - Order Paradinida

In Cavalier-Smith et al., 2009 a new superfamily Sainouroidea was named to include the family Sainouridae and the new monotypic family Helkesimastigidae including the genus Helkesimastix. Superfamily Sainouroidea was placed in class Sarcomonadea:

- Phylum Cercozoa
  - Subphylum Filosa
    - Class Metromonadea
      - Order Metromonadida
    - Class Granofilosea
      - Order Leucodictyida
      - Order Limnofilida
      - Order Cryptofilida
      - Order Desmothoracida
      - Order Heliomonadida
    - Superclass Reticulofilosa
      - Class Chlorarachnea
        - Order Chlorarachnida
    - Superclass Monadofilosa
      - Class Sarcomonadea
        - Superfamily Sainouroidea
        - Order Cercomonadida
        - Order Pansomonadida
        - Order Metopiida
        - Order Glissomonadida
      - Class Thecofilosea
        - Order Tectofilosida
        - Order Cryomonadida
      - Class Imbricatea
        - Order Thaumatomonadida
        - Order Euglyphida
      - Class Spongomonadea
        - Order Spongomonadida
      - Class Phaeodarea
      - Class Incertae sedis
        - Genus Pseudopirsonia
    - Superclass Incertae sedis
      - Genus Cercobodo
  - Subphylum Endomyxa
    - Class Proteomyxidea
      - Order Reticulosida
      - Order Aconchulinida
      - Order Pseudosporida
      - Order Incertae sedis
        - Family Rhizoplasmidae
    - Class Phytomyxea
      - Order Phagomyxida
      - Order Plasmodiophorida
    - Class Gromiidea
      - Order Gromiida
    - Class Ascetosporea
      - Order Haplosporida
      - Order Paramyxida
      - Order Claustrosporida
      - Order Paradinida

In Howe et al., 2011, order Spongomonadida, a new order Marimonadida that also included the genus Pseudopirsonia and a new incertae sedis family Nudifilidae was added to class Imbricatea. Genera Clautriavia and Discomonas were also added as Imbricatea incertae sedis. Phaeodarea was ranked as a subclass Phaeodaria and added to class Thecofilosea. Order Ebriida and a new order Ventricleftida was also added in class Thecofilosea. Order Metopiida was transferred to class Metromonadea. A new genus Micrometopion was added to class Metromonadea. Class Metromonadea was assigned to superclass Monadofilosa. A new order Tremulida was assigned to subphylum Filosa, Cercobodo became obsolete:

- Phylum Cercozoa
  - Subphylum Filosa
    - Order Tremulida
    - Class Granofilosea
      - Order Leucodictyida
      - Order Limnofilida
      - Order Cryptofilida
      - Order Desmothoracida
      - Order Heliomonadida
    - Superclass Reticulofilosa
      - Class Chlorarachnea
        - Order Chlorarachnida
    - Superclass Monadofilosa
      - Class Sarcomonadea
        - Superfamily Sainouroidea
        - Order Cercomonadida
        - Order Pansomonadida
        - Order Glissomonadida
      - Class Thecofilosea
        - Order Tectofilosida
        - Order Cryomonadida
        - Order Ventricleftida
        - Order Ebriida
        - Subclass Phaeodaria
      - Class Imbricatea
        - Order Thaumatomonadida
        - Order Euglyphida
        - Order Spongomonadida
        - Order Marimonadida
        - Order Incertae sedis
          - Genus Clautriavia
          - Genus Discomonas
          - Family Nudifilidae
      - Class Metromonadea
        - Genus Micrometopion
        - Order Metromonadida
        - Order Metopiida
  - Subphylum Endomyxa
    - Class Proteomyxidea
      - Order Reticulosida
      - Order Aconchulinida
      - Order Pseudosporida
      - Order Incertae sedis
        - Family Rhizoplasmidae
    - Class Phytomyxea
      - Order Phagomyxida
      - Order Plasmodiophorida
    - Class Gromiidea
      - Order Gromiida
    - Class Ascetosporea
      - Order Haplosporida
      - Order Paramyxida
      - Order Claustrosporida
      - Order Paradinida

In Cavalier-Smith and Karpov, 2012, superclass Monadofilosa was ranked as infraphylum. A new superclass called Ventrifilosa was used for the classes Thecofilosea and Imbricatea. A new class Skiomonadea was named for the only order Tremulida:

- Phylum Cercozoa
  - Subphylum Filosa
    - Class Granofilosea
      - Order Leucodictyida
      - Order Limnofilida
      - Order Cryptofilida
      - Order Desmothoracida
      - Order Heliomonadida
    - Class Skiomonadea
      - Order Tremulida
    - Superclass Reticulofilosa
      - Class Chlorarachnea
        - Order Chlorarachnida
    - Infraphylum Monadofilosa
      - Class Sarcomonadea
        - Superfamily Sainouroidea
        - Order Cercomonadida
        - Order Pansomonadida
        - Order Glissomonadida
      - Class Metromonadea
        - Genus Micrometopion
        - Order Metromonadida
        - Order Metopiida
      - Superclass Ventrifilosa
        - Class Thecofilosea
          - Order Tectofilosida
          - Order Cryomonadida
          - Order Ventricleftida
          - Order Ebriida
          - Subclass Phaeodaria
        - Class Imbricatea
          - Order Thaumatomonadida
          - Order Euglyphida
          - Order Spongomonadida
          - Order Marimonadida
          - Order Incertae sedis
            - Genus Clautriavia
            - Genus Discomonas
            - Family Nudifilidae
  - Subphylum Endomyxa
    - Class Proteomyxidea
      - Order Reticulosida
      - Order Aconchulinida
      - Order Pseudosporida
      - Order Incertae sedis
        - Family Rhizoplasmidae
    - Class Phytomyxea
      - Order Phagomyxida
      - Order Plasmodiophorida
    - Class Gromiidea
      - Order Gromiida
    - Class Ascetosporea
      - Order Haplosporida
      - Order Paramyxida
      - Order Claustrosporida
      - Order Paradinida

In Yabuki et al., 2012, order Heliomonadida was transferred to class Endohelea and a new order called Axomonadida was added to class Granofilosea:

- Phylum Cercozoa
  - Subphylum Filosa
    - Class Granofilosea
      - Order Leucodictyida
      - Order Limnofilida
      - Order Cryptofilida
      - Order Desmothoracida
      - Order Axomonadida
    - Class Skiomonadea
      - Order Tremulida
    - Superclass Reticulofilosa
      - Class Chlorarachnea
        - Order Chlorarachnida
    - Infraphylum Monadofilosa
      - Class Sarcomonadea
        - Superfamily Sainouroidea
        - Order Cercomonadida
        - Order Pansomonadida
        - Order Glissomonadida
      - Class Metromonadea
        - Genus Micrometopion
        - Order Metromonadida
        - Order Metopiida
      - Superclass Ventrifilosa
        - Class Thecofilosea
          - Order Tectofilosida
          - Order Cryomonadida
          - Order Ventricleftida
          - Order Ebriida
          - Subclass Phaeodaria
        - Class Imbricatea
          - Order Thaumatomonadida
          - Order Euglyphida
          - Order Spongomonadida
          - Order Marimonadida
          - Order Incertae sedis
            - Genus Clautriavia
            - Genus Discomonas
            - Family Nudifilidae
  - Subphylum Endomyxa
    - Class Proteomyxidea
      - Order Reticulosida
      - Order Aconchulinida
      - Order Pseudosporida
      - Order Incertae sedis
        - Family Rhizoplasmidae
    - Class Phytomyxea
      - Order Phagomyxida
      - Order Plasmodiophorida
    - Class Gromiidea
      - Order Gromiida
    - Class Ascetosporea
      - Order Haplosporida
      - Order Paramyxida
      - Order Claustrosporida
      - Order Paradinida

In Cavalier-Smith and Oates, 2012, a new superclass Eoglissa was named to contain the classes Metromonadea and Sarcomonadea in the infraphylum Monadofilosa. Family Katabiidae was assigned class Sarcomonadea incertae sedis:

- Phylum Cercozoa
  - Subphylum Filosa
    - Class Granofilosea
      - Order Leucodictyida
      - Order Limnofilida
      - Order Cryptofilida
      - Order Desmothoracida
      - Order Axomonadida
    - Class Skiomonadea
      - Order Tremulida
    - Superclass Reticulofilosa
      - Class Chlorarachnea
        - Order Chlorarachnida
    - Infraphylum Monadofilosa
      - Superclass Ventrifilosa
        - Class Thecofilosea
          - Order Tectofilosida
          - Order Cryomonadida
          - Order Ventricleftida
          - Order Ebriida
          - Subclass Phaeodaria
        - Class Imbricatea
          - Order Thaumatomonadida
          - Order Euglyphida
          - Order Spongomonadida
          - Order Marimonadida
          - Order Incertae sedis
            - Genus Clautriavia
            - Genus Discomonas
            - Family Nudifilidae
      - Superclass Eoglissa
        - Class Sarcomonadea
          - Superfamily Sainouroidea
          - Order Cercomonadida
          - Order Pansomonadida
          - Order Glissomonadida
          - Order Incertae sedis
            - Family Katabiidae
        - Class Metromonadea
          - Genus Micrometopion
          - Order Metromonadida
          - Order Metopiida
  - Subphylum Endomyxa
    - Class Proteomyxidea
      - Order Reticulosida
      - Order Aconchulinida
      - Order Pseudosporida
      - Order Incertae sedis
        - Family Rhizoplasmidae
    - Class Phytomyxea
      - Order Phagomyxida
      - Order Plasmodiophorida
    - Class Gromiidea
      - Order Gromiida
    - Class Ascetosporea
      - Order Haplosporida
      - Order Paramyxida
      - Order Claustrosporida
      - Order Paradinida

In Cavalier-Smith and Chao, 2012, four new subclasses, three new superorders and four new orders were named. New subclass Placoperla was assigned to class Imbricatea and contained the new superorders Perlatia and Placofila. Superorder Perlatia included the order Spongomonadida and the new order Perlofilida. Superorder Placofila contained the orders Rotosphaerida and Thaumatomonadida. New subclass Placonuda was also assigned to class Imbricatea contained the order Euglyphida and the new superorder Nudisarca which included the order Marimonadida and the incertae sedis family Nudifilidae. New subclass Eothecia was assigned to class Thecofilosea and contained the orders Ventricleftida, Ebriida, Cryomonadida, Hemimastigida and new order Matazida. New subclass Tectosia was also assigned to class Thecofilosea and contained the infraclass Phaeodaria which was previously subclass Phaeodaria and order Tectofilosida. New orders Eodarida and Opaloconchida were assigned to infraclass Phaeodaria:

- Phylum Cercozoa
  - Subphylum Filosa
    - Class Granofilosea
      - Order Leucodictyida
      - Order Limnofilida
      - Order Cryptofilida
      - Order Desmothoracida
      - Order Axomonadida
    - Class Skiomonadea
      - Order Tremulida
    - Superclass Reticulofilosa
      - Class Chlorarachnea
        - Order Chlorarachnida
    - Infraphylum Monadofilosa
      - Superclass Ventrifilosa
        - Class Thecofilosea
          - Subclass Eothecia
            - Order Cryomonadida
            - Order Ventricleftida
            - Order Ebriida
            - Order Hemimastigida
            - Order Matazida
          - Subclass Tectosia
            - Order Tectofilosida
            - Infraclass Phaeodaria
              - Order Eodarida
              - Order Opaloconchida
        - Class Imbricatea
          - Subclass Placoperla
            - Superorder Perlatia
              - Order Spongomonadida
              - Order Perlofilida
            - Superorder Placofila
              - Order Thaumatomonadida
              - Order Rotosphaerida
          - Subclass Placonuda
            - Order Euglyphida
            - Superorder Nudisarca
              - Order Marimonadida
              - Order Incertae sedis
                - Family Nudifilidae
          - Subclass Incertae sedis
            - Genus Clautriavia
            - Genus Discomonas
      - Superclass Eoglissa
        - Class Sarcomonadea
          - Superfamily Sainouroidea
          - Order Cercomonadida
          - Order Pansomonadida
          - Order Glissomonadida
          - Order Incertae sedis
            - Family Katabiidae
        - Class Metromonadea
          - Genus Micrometopion
          - Order Metromonadida
          - Order Metopiida
  - Subphylum Endomyxa
    - Class Proteomyxidea
      - Order Reticulosida
      - Order Aconchulinida
      - Order Pseudosporida
      - Order Incertae sedis
        - Family Rhizoplasmidae
    - Class Phytomyxea
      - Order Phagomyxida
      - Order Plasmodiophorida
    - Class Gromiidea
      - Order Gromiida
    - Class Ascetosporea
      - Order Haplosporida
      - Order Paramyxida
      - Order Claustrosporida
      - Order Paradinida

In Adl et al., 2012:

- Cercozoa
  - Cercomonadidae
  - Pansomonadida
  - Glissomonadida
  - Tremula
  - Metromonadea
  - Granofilosea
    - Limnofila
    - Massisteria
    - Mesofila
    - Minimassisteria
    - Nanofila
    - Clathrulinidae
  - Thecofilosea
    - Phaeodarea
      - Phaeoconchia
      - Phaeocystina
      - Phaeogromia
      - Phaeosphaeria
    - Cryomonadida
      - Rhizaspididae
      - Protaspidae
    - Ventricleftida
    - Ebriacea
    - Incertae sedis
      - Chlamydophryidae
      - Botuliforma
      - Mataza
      - Pseudodifﬂugia
  - Imbricatea
    - Spongomonadida
    - Nudifila
    - Marimonadida
    - Silicofilosea
      - Thaumatomonadida
        - Thaumatomonadidae
        - Peregriniidae
      - Euglyphida
        - Euglyphidae
        - Assulinidae
        - Trinematidae
        - Cyphoderiidae
        - Paulinellidae
        - Incertae sedis
          - Ampullataria
          - Deharvengia
          - Euglyphidion
          - Heteroglypha
          - Matsakision
          - Pareuglypha
          - Pileolus
          - Sphenoderia
          - Tracheleuglypha
          - Trachelocorythion
    - Incertae sedis
      - Clautriavia
      - Discomonas
  - Chlorarachniophyta
  - Vampyrellida
  - Phytomyxea
  - Filoreta
  - Gromia
  - Ascetosporea
    - Haplosporida
    - Paramyxida
    - Claustrosporidium
    - Paradiniidae
  - Incertae sedis
    - Psammonobiotidae
    - Volutellidae

In Cavalier-Smith, 2013, order Rotosphaerida was treated as class Cristidiscoidea instead and was placed in its own new subphylum Paramycia in phylum Choanozoa:

- Phylum Cercozoa
  - Subphylum Filosa
    - Class Granofilosea
      - Order Leucodictyida
      - Order Limnofilida
      - Order Cryptofilida
      - Order Desmothoracida
      - Order Axomonadida
    - Class Skiomonadea
      - Order Tremulida
    - Superclass Reticulofilosa
      - Class Chlorarachnea
        - Order Chlorarachnida
    - Infraphylum Monadofilosa
      - Superclass Ventrifilosa
        - Class Thecofilosea
          - Subclass Eothecia
            - Order Cryomonadida
            - Order Ventricleftida
            - Order Ebriida
            - Order Hemimastigida
            - Order Matazida
          - Subclass Tectosia
            - Order Tectofilosida
            - Infraclass Phaeodaria
              - Order Eodarida
              - Order Opaloconchida
        - Class Imbricatea
          - Subclass Placoperla
            - Superorder Perlatia
              - Order Spongomonadida
              - Order Perlofilida
            - Superorder Placofila
              - Order Thaumatomonadida
          - Subclass Placonuda
            - Order Euglyphida
            - Superorder Nudisarca
              - Order Marimonadida
              - Order Incertae sedis
                - Family Nudifilidae
          - Subclass Incertae sedis
            - Genus Clautriavia
            - Genus Discomonas
      - Superclass Eoglissa
        - Class Sarcomonadea
          - Superfamily Sainouroidea
          - Order Cercomonadida
          - Order Pansomonadida
          - Order Glissomonadida
          - Order Incertae sedis
            - Family Katabiidae
        - Class Metromonadea
          - Genus Micrometopion
          - Order Metromonadida
          - Order Metopiida
  - Subphylum Endomyxa
    - Class Proteomyxidea
      - Order Reticulosida
      - Order Aconchulinida
      - Order Pseudosporida
      - Order Incertae sedis
        - Family Rhizoplasmidae
    - Class Phytomyxea
      - Order Phagomyxida
      - Order Plasmodiophorida
    - Class Gromiidea
      - Order Gromiida
    - Class Ascetosporea
      - Order Haplosporida
      - Order Paramyxida
      - Order Claustrosporida
      - Order Paradinida

In Cavalier-Smith and Scoble, 2013, the incertae sedis genus Clautriavia was assigned to its own incertae sedis family Clautriaviidae:

- Phylum Cercozoa
  - Subphylum Filosa
    - Class Granofilosea
      - Order Leucodictyida
      - Order Limnofilida
      - Order Cryptofilida
      - Order Desmothoracida
      - Order Axomonadida
    - Class Skiomonadea
      - Order Tremulida
    - Superclass Reticulofilosa
      - Class Chlorarachnea
        - Order Chlorarachnida
    - Infraphylum Monadofilosa
      - Superclass Ventrifilosa
        - Class Thecofilosea
          - Subclass Eothecia
            - Order Cryomonadida
            - Order Ventricleftida
            - Order Ebriida
            - Order Hemimastigida
            - Order Matazida
          - Subclass Tectosia
            - Order Tectofilosida
            - Infraclass Phaeodaria
              - Order Eodarida
              - Order Opaloconchida
        - Class Imbricatea
          - Subclass Placoperla
            - Superorder Perlatia
              - Order Spongomonadida
              - Order Perlofilida
            - Superorder Placofila
              - Order Thaumatomonadida
          - Subclass Placonuda
            - Order Euglyphida
            - Superorder Nudisarca
              - Order Marimonadida
              - Order Incertae sedis
                - Family Nudifilidae
          - Subclass Incertae sedis
            - Genus Discomonas
            - Family Clautriaviidae
      - Superclass Eoglissa
        - Class Sarcomonadea
          - Superfamily Sainouroidea
          - Order Cercomonadida
          - Order Pansomonadida
          - Order Glissomonadida
          - Order Incertae sedis
            - Family Katabiidae
        - Class Metromonadea
          - Genus Micrometopion
          - Order Metromonadida
          - Order Metopiida
  - Subphylum Endomyxa
    - Class Proteomyxidea
      - Order Reticulosida
      - Order Aconchulinida
      - Order Pseudosporida
      - Order Incertae sedis
        - Family Rhizoplasmidae
    - Class Phytomyxea
      - Order Phagomyxida
      - Order Plasmodiophorida
    - Class Gromiidea
      - Order Gromiida
    - Class Ascetosporea
      - Order Haplosporida
      - Order Paramyxida
      - Order Claustrosporida
      - Order Paradinida

In Scoble and Cavalier-Smith, 2014, a new order Variglissida that included the families Nudifilidae and Clautriaviidae was named and placed in superorder Nudisarca. A new order Discomonadida that contained the only family Discomonadida and genus Discomonas was placed superclass Ventrifilosa incertae sedis, along with the order Ventricleftida and genera Abollifer and Heterochromonas. A new order Zoelucasida was placed in superorder Placofila. Order Pseudosporida was transferred to class Sarcomonadea:

- Phylum Cercozoa
  - Subphylum Filosa
    - Class Granofilosea
      - Order Leucodictyida
      - Order Limnofilida
      - Order Cryptofilida
      - Order Desmothoracida
      - Order Axomonadida
    - Class Skiomonadea
      - Order Tremulida
    - Superclass Reticulofilosa
      - Class Chlorarachnea
        - Order Chlorarachnida
    - Infraphylum Monadofilosa
      - Superclass Ventrifilosa
        - Class Thecofilosea
          - Subclass Eothecia
            - Order Cryomonadida
            - Order Ebriida
            - Order Hemimastigida
            - Order Matazida
          - Subclass Tectosia
            - Order Tectofilosida
            - Infraclass Phaeodaria
              - Order Eodarida
              - Order Opaloconchida
        - Class Imbricatea
          - Subclass Placoperla
            - Superorder Perlatia
              - Order Spongomonadida
              - Order Perlofilida
            - Superorder Placofila
              - Order Thaumatomonadida
              - Order Zoelucasida
          - Subclass Placonuda
            - Order Euglyphida
            - Superorder Nudisarca
              - Order Marimonadida
              - Order Variglissida
        - Class Incertae sedis
          - Genus Abollifer
          - Genus Heterochromonas
          - Order Discomonadida
          - Order Ventricleftida
      - Superclass Eoglissa
        - Class Sarcomonadea
          - Superfamily Sainouroidea
          - Order Cercomonadida
          - Order Pansomonadida
          - Order Glissomonadida
          - Order Pseudosporida
          - Order Incertae sedis
            - Family Katabiidae
        - Class Metromonadea
          - Genus Micrometopion
          - Order Metromonadida
          - Order Metopiida
  - Subphylum Endomyxa
    - Class Proteomyxidea
      - Order Reticulosida
      - Order Aconchulinida
      - Order Incertae sedis
        - Family Rhizoplasmidae
    - Class Phytomyxea
      - Order Phagomyxida
      - Order Plasmodiophorida
    - Class Gromiidea
      - Order Gromiida
    - Class Ascetosporea
      - Order Haplosporida
      - Order Paramyxida
      - Order Claustrosporida
      - Order Paradinida

In Ruggiero et al., 2015, a generally simplified scheme was presented with also some taxa not listed:

- Phylum Cercozoa
  - Subphylum Endomyxa
    - Class Ascetosporea
      - Order Claustrosporida
      - Order Haplosporida
      - Order Paradinida
      - Order Paramyxida
    - Class Gromiidea
      - Order Gromiida
      - Order Reticulosida
    - Class Phytomyxea
      - Order Phagomyxida
      - Order Plasmodiophorida
    - Class Vampyrellidea
      - Order Vampyrellida
  - Subphylum Monadofilosa
    - Class Imbricatea
      - Subclass Placonuda
        - Order Discocelida
        - Order Discomonadida
        - Order Euglyphida
        - Order Marimonadida
        - Order Variglissida
      - Subclass Placoperla
        - Order Perlofilida
        - Order Spongomonadida
        - Order Thaumatomonadida
        - Order Zoelucasida
    - Class Metromonadea
      - Order Metopiida
      - Order Metromonadida
    - Class Sarcomonadea
      - Order Cercomonadida
      - Order Glissomonadida
      - Order Pansomonadida
      - Order Pseudosporida
      - Order Sainouroida
    - Class Thecofilosea
      - Subclass Eothecia
        - Order Cryomonadida
        - Order Ebriida
        - Order Matazida
        - Order Ventricleftida
      - Subclass Phaeodaria
        - Order Eodarida
        - Order Opaloconchida
      - Subclass Tectosia
        - Order Tectofilosida
  - Subphylum Reticulofilosa
    - Class Chlorarachnea
      - Order Chlorarachnida
    - Class Granofilosea
      - Order Cryptofilida
      - Order Desmothoracida
      - Order Leucodictyida
      - Order Limnofilida
    - Class Skiomonadea
      - Order Tremulida

In Cavalier-Smith, 2018, a new order Minorisida was added to class Chlorarachnea. Order Axomonadida was used under class Granofilosea. Genus Micrometopion was used under class Metromonadea. Superclass Eoglissa was used for the class Metromonadea and new class Helkesea which included the order Ventricleftida and new order Helkesida that also included the superfamily Sainouroidea. Superclass Ventrifilosa was used for the classes Sarcomonadea, Imbricatea and Thecofilosea. Order Zoelucasida was transferred to subclass Placonuda and order Discocelida was transferred to subclass Placoperla. Order Perlofilida was still used but listed as only probably in subclass Placoperla. Subphylum Endomyxa was transferred to phylum Retaria:

- Phylum Cercozoa
  - Subphylum Reticulofilosa
    - Class Chlorarachnea
      - Order Chlorarachnida
      - Order Minorisida
    - Class Granofilosea
      - Order Cryptofilida
      - Order Desmothoracida
      - Order Leucodictyida
      - Order Limnofilida
      - Order Axomonadida
    - Class Skiomonadea
      - Order Tremulida
  - Subphylum Monadofilosa
    - Superclass Eoglissa
      - Class Metromonadea
        - Genus Micrometopion
        - Order Metopiida
        - Order Metromonadida
      - Class Helkesea
        - Order Helkesida
        - Order Ventricleftida
    - Superclass Ventrifilosa
      - Class Sarcomonadea
        - Order Cercomonadida
        - Order Glissomonadida
        - Order Pansomonadida
        - Order Pseudosporida
      - Class Imbricatea
        - Subclass Placonuda
          - Order Discomonadida
          - Order Euglyphida
          - Order Marimonadida
          - Order Variglissida
          - Order Zoelucasida
        - Subclass Placoperla
          - Order Perlofilida (probably)
          - Order Spongomonadida
          - Order Thaumatomonadida
          - Order Discocelida
      - Class Thecofilosea
        - Subclass Eothecia
          - Order Cryomonadida
          - Order Ebriida
          - Order Matazida
        - Subclass Phaeodaria
          - Order Eodarida
          - Order Opaloconchida
        - Subclass Tectosia
          - Order Tectofilosida

In Cavalier-Smith et al., 2018, order Aquavolonida was added to class Skiomonadea. Genus Micrometopion was added to the family Metopiidae in order Metopiida. Order Ventricleftida was transferred to a new subclass Ventricleftia in class Thecofilosea. A new order Paracercomonadida was assigned to a new subclass Paracercomonadia in class Sarcomonadea. Order Pansomonadida was ranked as suborder Pansomonadina and assigned to order Glissomonadida. Order Pseudosporida was assigned infrakingdom Rhizaria incertae sedis. A new subclass Pediglissa was assigned to class Sarcomonadea and contained the orders Cercomonadida and Glissomonadida. Superorder Nudisarca was used for the orders Variglissida and Marimonadida in subclass Placonuda. A new superorder Euglyphia was assigned to subclass Placonuda and contained the orders Euglyphida and Zoelucasida. A new superorder Discomonada was assigned to subclass Placonuda and contained the order Discomonadida. Superorder Placofila was used for the orders Thaumatomonadida and Discocelida in subclass Placoperla. Superorder Perlatia was used for the orders Spongomonadida and Perlofilida. A new subclass Krakenia was named to include a new order Krakenida in the class Imbricatea:

- Phylum Cercozoa
  - Subphylum Reticulofilosa
    - Class Chlorarachnea
      - Order Chlorarachnida
      - Order Minorisida
    - Class Granofilosea
      - Order Cryptofilida
      - Order Desmothoracida
      - Order Leucodictyida
      - Order Limnofilida
      - Order Axomonadida
    - Class Skiomonadea
      - Order Tremulida
      - Order Aquavolonida
  - Subphylum Monadofilosa
    - Superclass Eoglissa
      - Class Metromonadea
        - Order Metopiida
        - Order Metromonadida
      - Class Helkesea
        - Order Helkesida
    - Superclass Ventrifilosa
      - Class Sarcomonadea
        - Subclass Paracercomonadia
          - Order Paracercomonadida
        - Subclass Pediglissa
          - Order Cercomonadida
          - Order Glissomonadida
      - Class Imbricatea
        - Subclass Placonuda
          - Superorder Nudisarca
            - Order Variglissida
            - Order Marimonadida
          - Superorder Euglyphia
            - Order Euglyphida
            - Order Zoelucasida
          - Superorder Discomonada
            - Order Discomonadida
        - Subclass Placoperla
          - Superorder Placofila
            - Order Thaumatomonadida
            - Order Discocelida
          - Superorder Perlatia
            - Order Spongomonadida
            - Order Perlofilida
        - Subclass Krakenia
          - Order Krakenida
      - Class Thecofilosea
        - Subclass Ventricleftia
          - Order Ventricleftida
        - Subclass Eothecia
          - Order Matazida
          - Order Ebriida
          - Order Cryomonadida
        - Subclass Phaeodaria
          - Order Eodarida
          - Order Opaloconchida
        - Subclass Tectosia
          - Order Tectofilosida

In Adl et al., 2019:

- Cercozoa
  - Cercomonadida
  - Paracercomonadida
  - Glissomonadida
    - Sandonidae
    - Dujardinidae
    - Bodomorphidae
    - Proleptomonadidae
    - Allapsidae
  - Viridiraptoridae
  - Pansomonadida
  - Sainouroidea
    - Sainouridae
    - Helkesimastigidae
    - Guttulinopsidae
  - Thecofilosea
    - Phaeodarea
      - Phaoconchia
      - Phaeocystina
      - Phaeogromia
      - Phaeosphaeria
    - Cryomonadida
      - Rhogostomidae
      - Protaspidae
    - Ventricleftida
    - Tectofilosida
      - Pseudodifflugia
      - Rhizaspis
      - Fisculla
      - Chlamydophryidae
    - Ebriacea
    - Incertae sedis
      - Mataza
  - Imbricatea
    - Spongomonadida
    - Marimonadida
    - Variglissida
    - Silicofilosea
      - Thaumatomonadida
        - Thaumatomonadidae
        - Esquamula
        - Peregriniidae
      - Euglyphida
        - Euglyphina
          - Assulinidae
          - Sphenoderiidae
          - Trinematidae
          - Euglyphidae
          - Tracheleuglypha
        - Cyphoderiidae
        - Paulinellidae
        - Incertae sedis
          - Ampullataria
          - Euglyphidion
          - Heteroglypha
          - Matsakision
          - Pareuglypha
          - Pileolus
  - Metromonadea
  - Granofilosea
    - Massisteridae
    - Clathrulinidae
    - Incertae sedis
      - Apogromia
      - Kibisidytes
      - Leucodictyon
      - Limnofila
      - Mesofila
      - Microcometes
      - Microgromia
      - Nanofila
      - Reticulamoeba
      - Belaria (probably)
      - Ditrema (probably)
      - Heliomorpha (probably)
      - Paralieberkuehnia (probably)
  - Chlorarachnea
  - Incertae sedis
    - Discocelia
    - Psammonobiotidae
    - Volutellidae
    - Kraken
    - Dictiomyxa
    - Katabia
    - Myxodictyium
    - Pontomyxa
    - Protomyxa
    - Protogenes
    - Pseudospora
    - Rhizoplasma

In Cavalier-Smith, 2022, order Axomonadida was assigned to class Endohelea and order Heliomonadida was assigned to class Granofilosea:

- Phylum Cercozoa
  - Subphylum Reticulofilosa
    - Class Chlorarachnea
      - Order Chlorarachnida
      - Order Minorisida
    - Class Granofilosea
      - Order Cryptofilida
      - Order Desmothoracida
      - Order Leucodictyida
      - Order Limnofilida
      - Order Heliomonadida
    - Class Skiomonadea
      - Order Tremulida
      - Order Aquavolonida
  - Subphylum Monadofilosa
    - Superclass Eoglissa
      - Class Metromonadea
        - Order Metopiida
        - Order Metromonadida
      - Class Helkesea
        - Order Helkesida
    - Superclass Ventrifilosa
      - Class Sarcomonadea
        - Subclass Paracercomonadia
          - Order Paracercomonadida
        - Subclass Pediglissa
          - Order Cercomonadida
          - Order Glissomonadida
      - Class Imbricatea
        - Subclass Placonuda
          - Superorder Nudisarca
            - Order Variglissida
            - Order Marimonadida
          - Superorder Euglyphia
            - Order Euglyphida
            - Order Zoelucasida
          - Superorder Discomonada
            - Order Discomonadida
        - Subclass Placoperla
          - Superorder Placofila
            - Order Thaumatomonadida
            - Order Discocelida
          - Superorder Perlatia
            - Order Spongomonadida
            - Order Perlofilida
        - Subclass Krakenia
          - Order Krakenida
      - Class Thecofilosea
        - Subclass Ventricleftia
          - Order Ventricleftida
        - Subclass Eothecia
          - Order Matazida
          - Order Ebriida
          - Order Cryomonadida
        - Subclass Phaeodaria
          - Order Eodarida
          - Order Opaloconchida
        - Subclass Tectosia
          - Order Tectofilosida
