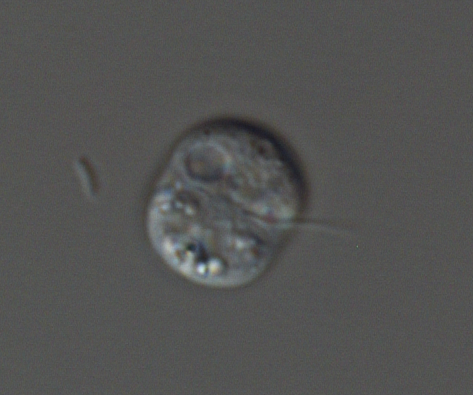
- Dorsal view, with visible cleft-like aperture and extended pseudoodium

Scientific classification
- Domain: Eukaryota
- Clade: Sar
- Clade: Rhizaria
- Phylum: Cercozoa
- Class: Thecofilosea
- Order: Cryomonadida
- Family: Rhogostomidae
- Genus: Rhogostoma
- Species: R. minus

Binomial name
- Rhogostoma minus Belar, 1921

= Rhogostoma minus =

Species of thecate amoebae

Rhogostoma minus is a species of thecate amoeba that belongs to the phylum Cercozoa. It was first described by Belar in 1921. These amoebae are heterotrophic, which means that they consume other organisms for nutrition. The cells of Rhogostoma minus are typically between 8 and 12 μm in diameter and are surrounded by a protective organic covering called a theca. The theca has a unique cleft-like opening that allows the amoebae to extend and retract thread-like projections called filose pseudopodia. The amoebae move along surfaces by pulling themselves forward using their pseudopodia.

Rhogostoma minus can be found in various environments, including freshwater, soil, and wastewater. In fact, researchers have discovered that Rhogostoma minus forms an endosymbiotic relationship with certain bacteria called Gammaproteobacteria, which belong to the order Legionellales, in wastewater treatment plants.
