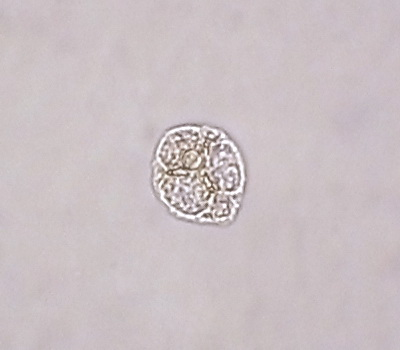
- Ebria tripartita

Scientific classification
- Domain: Eukaryota
- Clade: Sar
- Clade: Rhizaria
- Phylum: Cercozoa
- Class: Thecofilosea
- Order: Ebriales
- Family: Ebriaceae
- Genus: Ebria; Borgert, 1891

Type species
- Ebria fornix (Möbius 1887) Borgert 1891

Species
- †E. danica Frenguelli 1940; †E. gracilis (Deflandre 1932) Frenguelli 1940; †E. hannai (Deflandre 1934b) Deflandre 1950; †E. inornata (Hovasse 1943) Deflandre 1951; E. longispina Hada 1967; E. fornix (Möbius 1887) Borgert 1891; †E. mediterranensis Dumitrica 1973; E. tripartita (Schumann 1867) Lemmermann 1899

Synonyms
- †Ebriella Deflandre 1934b; †Parammodochium Deflandre 1932; †Proebria Hovasse 1943

= Ebria =

Genus of single-celled organisms

Ebria is a genus of rhizaria.

It includes the species Ebria tripartita.
