= Leptogromia =

Scientific classification
- Domain: Eukaryota
- Clade: Sar
- Clade: Rhizaria
- Phylum: Cercozoa
- Subphylum: Filosa
- Class: Imbricatea
- Order: Trivalvulariida
- Family: Trivalvulariidae
- Genus: Leptogromia; Valkanov, 1970
- Species: L. operculata

Binomial name
- Leptogromia operculata Valkanov, 1970

Genus of protists

Leptogromia operculata is a species of testate amoeba which has three flexible 'membranes' which can be opened or closed, and has a large number of filopodia which L. operculata uses to move around and to catch prey.

== Description ==
L. operculata has a rounded and triangular aperture, with a small tube which it uses to fill its membrane. L. operculata has filopodia which have bidirectional streams of small granules. L. operculata also can show a web of long pseudopodia which it can use in order to catch prey, or to move around.

== Ecology ==
L. operculata usually lives in brackish and marine environments. Alexandar Valkanov (the person who first described Leptogromia operculata) reported the first sighting of the testate amoeba in the Black Sea, and sampled the organism from sediment from a small stream.

== Remarks ==
The most remarkable feature of L. operculata is its globule which is always present in the cytoplasm just above its aperture, another remarkable thing about its aperture is that it has a triangular shape. However, Valkanov reported it as being circular in shape, but he has probably overlooked this small trait.
