= Thaumatomonas =

Scientific classification
- Domain: Eukaryota
- Clade: Sar
- Clade: Rhizaria
- Phylum: Cercozoa
- Class: Imbricatea
- Order: Thaumatomonadida
- Family: Thaumatomonadidae
- Genus: Thaumatomonas; De Saedeleer, 1931

Type species
- Thaumatomonas lauterborni de Saedeleer, 1931

Genus of single-celled organisms

Thaumatomonas is a genus within class Imbricatea of the phylum Cercozoa.

It includes the species

- Thaumatomonas coloniensis Wylezich et al. 2007
- Thaumatomonas constricta Scoble & Cavalier-Smith 2014
- Thaumatomonas hindoni (Nicholls 2012) Scoble & Cavalier-Smith 2014
- Thaumatomonas lauterborni de Saedeleer 1931
- Thaumatomonas oxoniensis Bass & Cavalier-Smith 2011
- Thaumatomonas seravini Mylnikov & Karpov 1993
- Thaumatomonas solis Scoble & Cavalier-Smith 2014
- Thaumatomonas vancouveri Cavalier-Smith & Chao 2011
- Thaumatomonas zhukovi Mylnikov 2003
