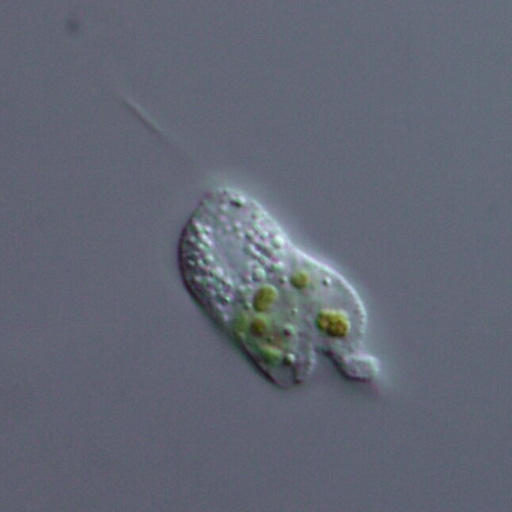
- Cercomonas

Scientific classification
- Domain: Eukaryota
- Supergroup: Rhizaria
- Phylum: Cercozoa
- Subphylum: Filosa
- Infraphylum: Monadofilosa
- Class: Sarcomonadea; Cavalier-Smith, 1993 stat. nov. 1995 emend. 2018

Orders and incertae sedis
- Paracercomonadia; Paracercomonadida; Pediglissa; Cercomonadida; Glissomonadida; Variglissida; Incertae sedis; Katabiidae

Synonyms
- Sarcomonadia Cavalier-Smith, 1993

= Sarcomonadea =

Class of flagellate protists

The sarcomonads (from Ancient Greek σαρκώδης (sarkṓdēs) 'fleshy, i.e. amoeboid' and μονάς (monás) 'unit') or class Sarcomonadea are a group of amoeboid biciliate protists in the phylum Cercozoa. They are characterized by a propensity to move through gliding on their posterior cilium or through filopodia, a lack of scales or external theca, a soft cell surface without obvious cortical filamentous or membranous skeleton, two cilia without scales or hairs, tubular mitochondrial cristae, near-spherical extrusomes, and a microbody (probably a peroxisome) attached to the nucleus.

== History ==
In 1993 Cavalier-Smith described the sarcomonads as a subclass known as Sarcomonadia, an assemblage of unrelated cercozoans (thaumatomonads, proteomyxids, cercomonads...) and excavates (jakobids), in the now defunct class Heteromitea, in the old phylum Opalozoa. This subclass was created to lump together protozoa that have an anisokont type of zoospore (i.e. two cilia of different lengths), are non-thecate and have isodiametric extrusomes. Sarcomonadia was composed of three superorders:

1. Jakobidea (orders Jakobida and Cercomonadida), made up of sarcomonads with a single Golgi dictyosome;
2. Thaumatomonadidea (order Thaumatomonadida), with scales made in vesicles associated with the mitochondria;
3. Proteomyxidea (orders Pseudosporida and Leucodictyida), made up of sarcomonads with an unusual intranuclear rod of microfilaments unseen in other protists.

Phylogenetic analyses published in 1997 showed close relationships between filose and reticulose amoebae and zooflagellates such as the sarcomonads, and they were grouped under the provisional phylum Rhizopoda. In here, the sarcomonads were grouped as the class Sarcomonadea inside the subphylum Monadofilosa, and Sarcomonadea was emended to exclude the proteomyxids and jakobids.

Later, in Cavalier-Smith's A revised six-kingdom system of life of 1998, the phylum Cercozoa was created to formally establish this group of protists previously known as Rhizopoda. This discovery put an end to the taxonomical dichotomy between amoebae and flagellates, since they are phylogenetically intermingled in Cercozoa.

In 2003 the term Sarcomonadea was emended again to contain only two orders:

1. Metopiida, comprising the single species Metopion fluens, but was later moved into a different class;
2. Cercomonadida, the first current sarcomonad order, comprising the families Cercomonadidae and Heteromitidae.

In 2009 the problematic Heteromitidae were broken apart and rearranged into the second current sarcomonad order Glissomonadida.

In 2012 the paracercomonads joined Sarcomonadea, initially as cercomonads and later as the third current sarcomonad order Paracercomonadida. At the same time, in 2012, the superclass Ventrifilosa was created to comprise Imbricatea and Thecofilosea, later expanded in 2018 to also include Sarcomonadea. That same year, in 2012, the protist Katabia was added to Sarcomonadea but remained incertae sedis within the group. In 2026, the fourth current sarcomonad order Variglissida was transferred from Imbricatea and added to the group.

== Classification ==
The current classification divides the class into four orders: paracercomonads (subclass Paracercomonadia), cercomonads, glissomonads and variglissids (subclass Pediglissa).

- Class Sarcomonadea Cavalier-Smith, 1993 stat. nov. 1995 emend. 2018
  - Subclass Paracercomonadia Cavalier-Smith, 2018
    - Order Paracercomonadida Cavalier-Smith, 2018
      - Family Paracercomonadidae Cavalier-Smith, 2012
  - Subclass Pediglissa Cavalier-Smith, 2018
    - Order Cercomonadida Poche, 1913 emend. Cavalier-Smith
      - Family Cavernomonadidae Cavalier-Smith, 2012
      - Family Cercomonadidae Saville Kent 1880-1881, emend. Cavalier-Smith
    - Order Glissomonadida Howe et al., 2009
      - Suborder Allapsina Cavalier-Smith, 2018
        - Family Allapsidae Howe et al., 2009
        - Family Dujardinidae Howe and Cavalier-Smith, 2011
      - Suborder Sandonina Cavalier-Smith, 2018
        - Family Bodomorphidae Hollande, 1952
        - Family Sandonidae Howe et al., 2009
        - Family Proleptomonadidae Howe et al. 2009
      - Suborder Pansomonadina Vickerman, 2005 stat. nov. Cavalier-Smith, 2018
        - Family Viridiraptoridae Hess & Melkonian, 2013
        - Family Agitatidae Cavalier-Smith & Bass, 2009
        - Family Acinetactidae Stokes, 1886
        - Family Aurigamonadidae Cavalier-Smith, 2011
    - Order Variglissida Cavalier-Smith, 2014
      - Family Clautriaviidae Cavalier-Smith, 2013
      - Family Nudifilidae Cavalier-Smith, 2011
      - Family Quadricilidae Cavalier-Smith, 2018
  - Sarcomonadea incertae sedis
    - Family Katabiidae Cavalier-Smith, 2012
