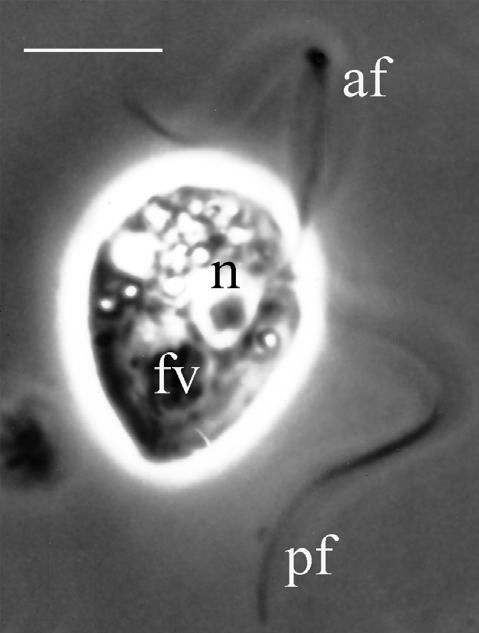
- Light contrast microphotograph of K. gromovi showing anterior (af) and posterior (pf) flagella, a nucleus (n) and a vacuole (fv)

Scientific classification
- Domain: Eukaryota
- Clade: Sar
- Clade: Rhizaria
- Phylum: Cercozoa
- Subphylum: Filosa
- Infraphylum: Monadofilosa
- Clade: incertae sedis
- Family: Katabiidae; Cavalier-Smith in Cavalier-Smith & Oates 2012
- Genus: Katabia; Karpov, Ekelund & Moestrup 2003
- Species: K. gromovi

Binomial name
- Katabia gromovi Karpov, Ekelund & Moestrup 2003

= Katabia =

Genus of heterotrophic protists

Katabia is a genus of soil-dwelling heterotrophic flagellate cercozoans containing the single species Katabia gromovi, and the only member of family Katabiidae.

== Morphology ==
Katabia are drop-shaped unicellular flagellates with a broad anterior end and a tapering posterior end. They have two heterodynamic (with different movements) flagella. Inside their cells are a microbody, refractile granules shaped like mushrooms, kinetocysts and a well-developed cytoskeleton similar to the one found in Heteromita. Their life cycle has two forms: a free-living trophozoite that feeds on bacteria through pseudopodia while swimming, and a cyst that is surrounded by a thick mucilage-like wall. Instead of gliding upon the substrate, like other cercozoans, they have secondarily lost the ability to glide with cilia, and only swim freely using their flagella.

In particular, the species Katabia gromovi is a soil-dwelling flagellate with a prominent dorsal side and a flattened ventral side, whose length is between 8 and 12 μm while its width is between 5 and 7 μm. Its flagella appear approximately one fourth of the cell's length starting from the anterior broad end. The posterior flagellum is approximately 2.5 times the cell's length, while the anterior flagellum is 1.5 times the cell's length and has a shorter acronema (a thin hair-like projection found at the end of each flagella).

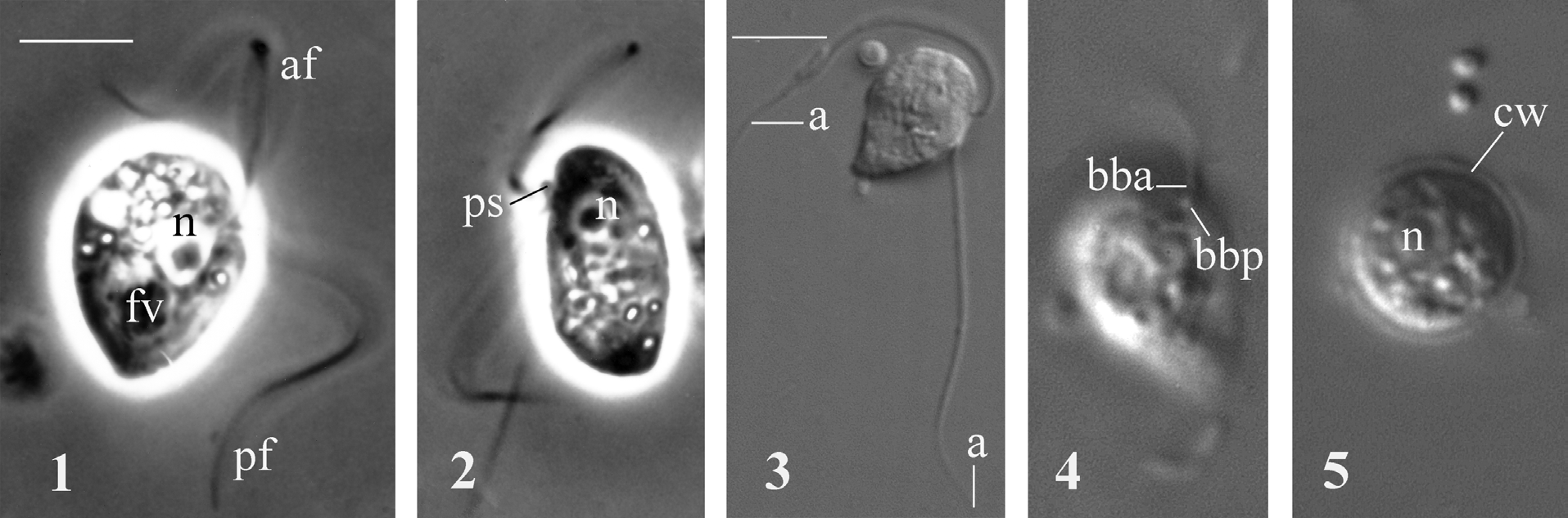
Light microscopy images of Katabia gromovi showing its cell body, two flagella and both trophozoite (1–4) and cyst (5) forms. Abbreviations: a = acroneme, af = anterior flagellum, bba = basal body of anterior flagellum, bbp = basal body of posterior flagellum, cw = cyst wall, fv = food vacuole, n = nucleus, pf = posterior flagellum, ps = pseudopodium. Taken by Serguei A. Karpov, Flemming Ekelund and Øjvind Moestrup in 2003 to describe the species.

== Etymology ==
While the genus' name has no meaning, the species' epithet was chosen to commemorate the late Professor Boris Vasilievich Gromov, an important Russian microbiologist and protistologist.

== Taxonomic affinities ==
Following its discovery in 2003 multiple similarities were found between Katabia and the cercomonad Heteromita in morphology, behavior, life cycle and cytoskeleton structure, and was placed inside the order Cercomonadida of class Sarcomonadea. However, in 2012 the species was placed as Sarcomonadea incertae sedis, under its own family Katabiidae, because of the uncertainty of its phylogenetic relationships and because it shares similarities with both cercomonads in the structure of the flagella and with glissomonads in the structure of the cilia.
