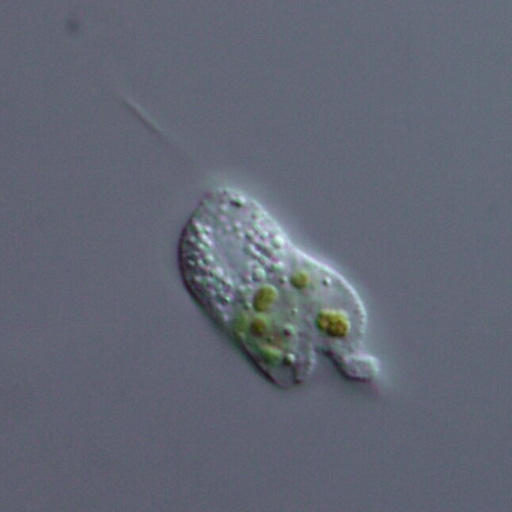
- Cercomonas

Scientific classification
- Domain: Eukaryota
- Clade: Sar
- Clade: Rhizaria
- Phylum: Cercozoa
- Subphylum: Filosa
- Infraphylum: Monadofilosa

Classes
- Metromonadea; Helkesea; Sarcomonadea (paraphyletic); Thecofilosea; Imbricatea

= Monadofilosa =

Group of protists

Monadofilosa is a grouping of Cercozoa. (It is sometimes considered one of three, the other two being Endomyxa and Reticulofilosa.) These organisms are single-celled amoeboid protists.

== Classification ==
Monadofilosa was originally proposed as a subphylum of Phylum Rhizopoda and subsequently treated as superclass, infraphylum or subphylum in different taxonomic treatments. Monadofilosa includes the testate amoebae known as "testaceans", and the cercomonads. It is sometimes described as Testaceafilosia and Sarcomonadea. It has also been described as Sarcomonadea (Cercomonas, Heteromita, Bodomorpha, Proleptomonas, Allantion), Thecofilosea (Cryptodifflugia, Cryothecomonas), Spongomonadea (Spongomonas, Rhipidodendron), and Imbricatea (Thaumatomonas, Thaumatomastix, Allas, Gyromitus, Euglypha, Trinema, Paulinella).

- The testaceans live both in marine and freshwater habitats, and in mosses. Members include Lecythium, Pseudodifflugia, Euglypha (a euglyphid), and Paulinella chromatophora.
- Cercomonads are flagellates that glide on their posterior cilium and/or generate filopodia. Members of this group contain Cryothecomonas, Thaumatomonas, which is covered with siliceous scales, and Cercomonas, which is naked. Cercomonas contains several species that show exhibit amoeboid movement, such as the testate amoeba Cyphoderia, and the flagellate Cryothecomonas.

Sainouron has been grouped in Monadofilosa.
