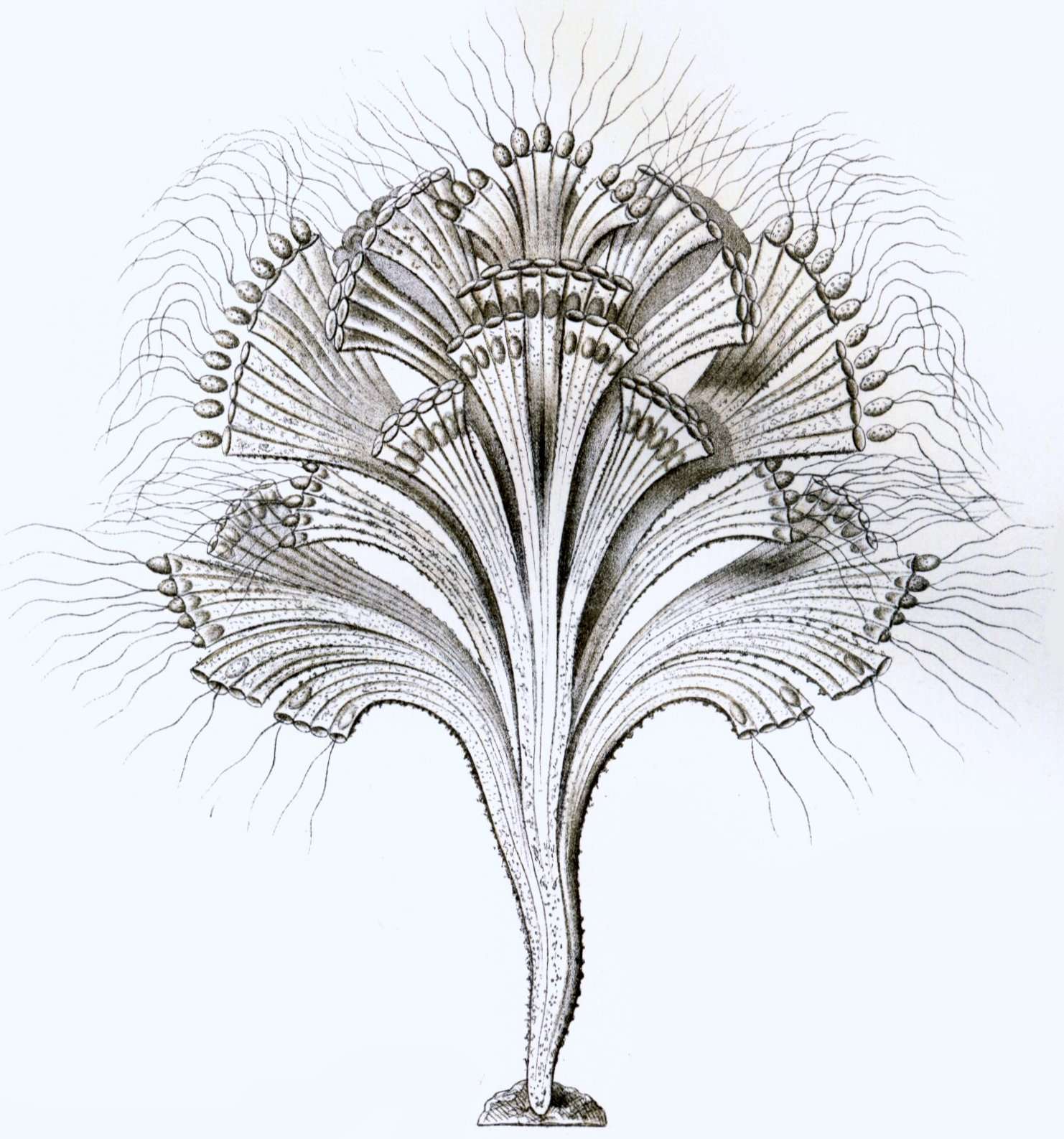
- Rhipidodendron splendidum

Scientific classification
- Domain: Eukaryota
- Clade: Sar
- Clade: Rhizaria
- Phylum: Cercozoa
- Subphylum: Filosa
- Class: Imbricatea
- Order: Spongomonadida; Hibberd 1983
- Family: Spongomonadidae; Karpov 1990

Genera
- Rhipidodendron; Spongomonas

= Spongomonadida =

Group of protists

The spongomonads are a group of flagellated protists in the phylum Cercozoa. Taxonomically, they compose the family Spongomonadidae and order Spongomonadida. They were originally placed among the Reticulofilosa, but were later transferred to Monadofilosa. It includes only two genera:

- Spongomonas Stein 1878
- Rhipidodendron Stein 1878
