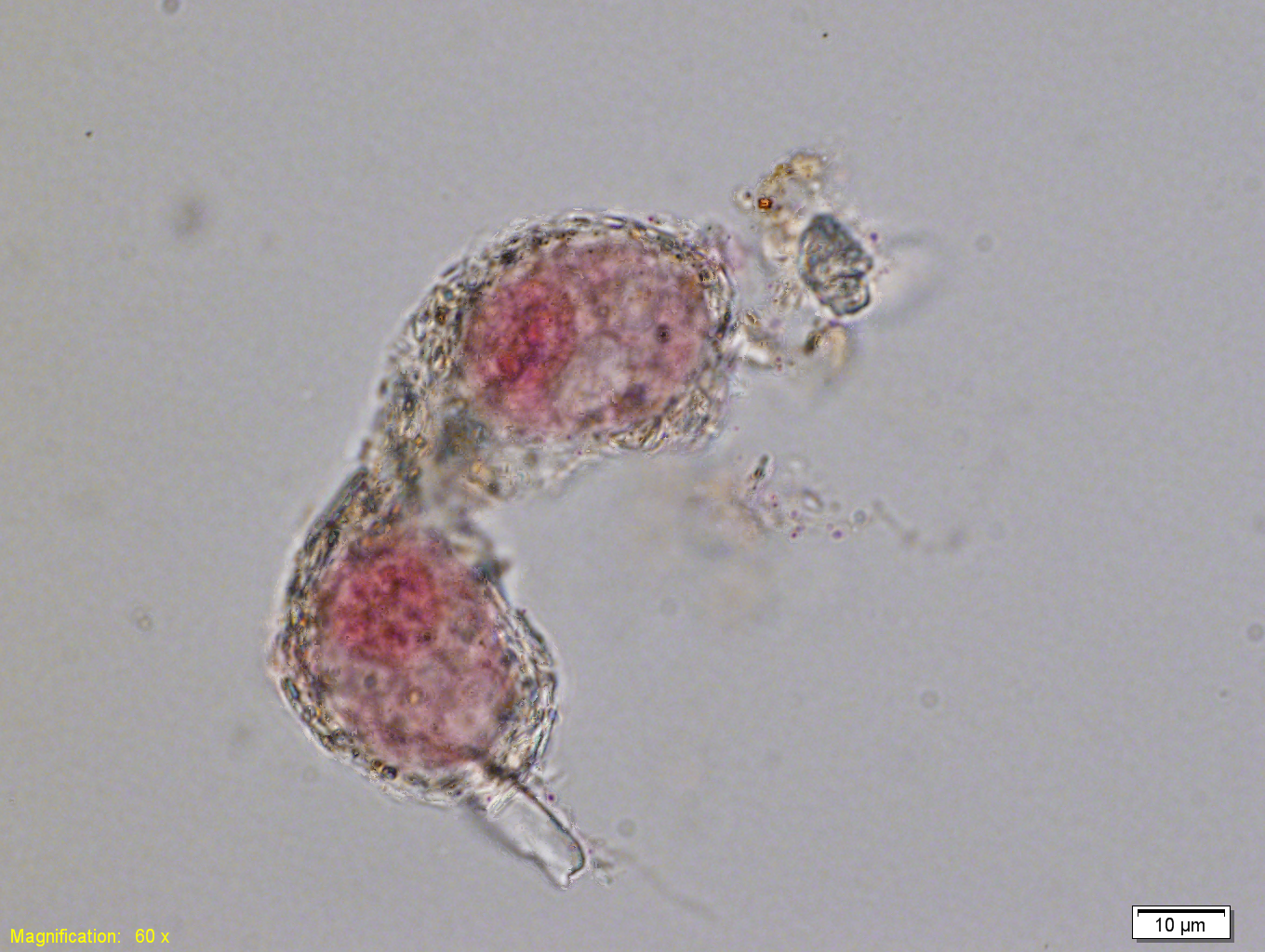
- Two preserved specimens of Capsellina sp. (Chlamydophryidae), from the Eugène Penard collection

Scientific classification
- Domain: Eukaryota
- Clade: Sar
- Clade: Rhizaria
- Phylum: Cercozoa
- Subphylum: Filosa
- Class: Thecofilosea
- Order: Tectofilosida; Cavalier-Smith in Cavalier-Smith & Chao 2003

Families
- Chlamydophryidae; Fiscullidae; Pseudodifflugiidae; Rhizaspididae

= Tectofilosida =

Group of protists

Tectofilosida is an order of filose amoebae with shells. These are composed of organic materials and sometimes collected debris, in contrast to the euglyphids, which produce shells from siliceous scales. The shell usually has a single opening, but in Amphitrema and a few other genera it has two on opposite ends. The cell itself occupies most of the shell. They are most often found on marsh plants such as Sphagnum.

This group was previously classified as the Gromiida or Gromiina. However, molecular studies separate Gromia from the others, which must therefore be renamed. They are placed among the Cercozoa, and presumably developed from flagellates like Cryothecomonas, which has a similar test. However, only a few have been studied in detail, so their relationships and monophyly are not yet certain.

In a recent classification, the group Tectofilosida was not used.

Lithocollidae was formerly placed in Tectofilosida, but 18S rRNA-based molecular phylogenetic analyses show it is actually part of Nucleariida.
