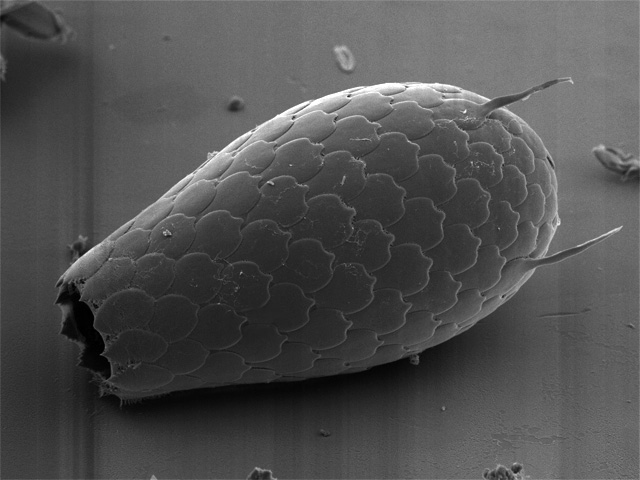
- Euglypha sp., a euglyphid

Scientific classification
- Domain: Eukaryota
- Supergroup: Rhizaria
- Phylum: Cercozoa
- Subphylum: Filosa
- Infraphylum: Monadofilosa
- Class: Imbricatea; Cavalier-Smith in Cavalier-Smith & Chao 2003, emend. Howe et al. 2011

Orders
- Spongomonadida; Marimonadida; Variglissida (=Novel Clade 2); Thaumatomonadida; Euglyphia; Euglyphida; Zoelucasida; Trivalvulariida (=Novel Clade 3); Incertae sedis; Discomonada; Discomonadida; And see text

Cladistically included but traditionally excluded classes and orders
- Thecofilosea; Metromonadea; Glissomonadida; Pansomonadida; Cercomonadida; Discocelida?; And see text

Synonyms
- Silicofilosea Adl et al. 2005

= Imbricatea =

Class of cercozoans

Imbricatea is a class of cercozoans. It was first defined by silica scales, but later expanded to also include scale-free groups. The class was once believed to be monophyletic and their ancestors were thought to have been gliding zooflagellates, with the groove and flagella have secondarily lost in euglyphids. Some imbricates have yellowish or brownish structures, in many imbricates this coloration is subtle, they were also thought to be secondarily lost. Later analyses showed the class was polyphyletic.

== Characteristics ==
Imbricate silica scales are found. Their closest relatives, which lack scales, also belong to this Cercozoa class. They possess two flagella and divergent centrioles. Additionally (unlike most sarcomonads), they have a relatively rigid pellicle. This pellicle helps form a distinct ventral groove from which filose pseudopodia extended, but they lack the dense extracellular theca of Thecofilosea or the internal skeleton found in ebriids and Phaeodaria. They possess a longer flagellar transition zone than cercomonads and sainouroids, and unlike them, they also have a dense distal plate; however, they lack the internal dense aggregates and elaborate extra structures opposite the thecal contact zone in cryomonads. In Auranticordis, a marimonad, the centrioles have multiplied and been reoriented to form four gliding posterior flagella. Auranticordis has also lost its pseudopodia. In thaumatomonads and spongomonads, the centrioles have independently become parallel. Some imbricates have yellowish or brownish structures.

=== Spongomonadida ===
The anterior portion of this group’s members features an asymmetrical cell projection and they are biciliate cells.

=== Marimonadida ===
These are marine zooflagellates lacking scales and thecas. They include biflagellate swimming cells, the example being the diatom parasite Pseudopirsonia. It also includes interstitial gliding zooflagellates. These have somewhat deformable, semi-rigid pellicle underlain by muciferous bodies and four posterior flagella associated with ventral cleft (Auranticordis). Absence of silica scales and the presence of flagella distinguishes them from euglyphids. They are also distinguished from the other gliding imbricate group, the thaumatomonads, by the absence of scales. Rhabdamoeba was previously considered a part of this group, but genetic data revealed it to be a chlorarachniophyte. Etymology: "mare" (Latin for sea), "monas" (Greek for unit), because all known members are marine zooflagellates.

=== Variglissida ===
These are cercozoan zooflagellates that lack cilia and possess a single, long posterior cilium. This cilium is used for gliding over surfaces. They are either characterized by a rigid dorsal region, a ventral groove, the absence of pseudopodia, and a reduced or absent anterior cilium (Clautriavia), or they have a soft body, filose branching, thread-like pseudopodia, and anterior cilium that stands out (Nudifila), or they are non-gliding heterotrophic cells with four cilia, a plastic body, and thin, branching, non-granular pseudopodia, lacking a cytostome and an obvious ventral groove (Quadricilia).

=== Thaumatomonadida ===
Generally gliding but also capable may be capable of swimming, heterotrophic, with a flattened body; inserting two heterodynamic cilia in the subapically and/or ventrally; some of which are unikonts; possessing extrusomes; with filopodia producing from the subapical region or the ventral groove; and cyst-bearing cercozoans. Multinucleate and multiciliated stages known.

=== Discomonadida ===
Rigid, round disc-like dorso-ventrally flattened gliding zooflagellates with two conspicuous cilia. Divergent centrioles are located in the subapical region behind the apical notch. Like Protaspa species, they possess a large nucleus that is visible under a light microscope. However, they differ from those species in their lack of pseudopodia and their ability to glide on the shorter cilium at the posterior end.

=== Euglyphia ===
Large, single-rowed, imbricate scales cover the cell; these organisms have apical aperture through which protrude filose pseudopodia or two unequal, non-gliding cilia individually from the apical opening (not both).

==== Euglyphida ====
Testate amoebae with shells composed of organic material. Most members possess secreted silica scales held together by organic cemend. Mitochondrial cristae are tubular, and pseudopodia are filamentous. The nucleus is easily visible in active cells under a light microscope. The nucleus is large and conspicuous, surrounded by vesicles.

==== Zoelucasida ====
The posterior cilia are curved backward; the cells have non-sliding double cilia. Parallel centrioles are present. A large nucleus and a rigid lorica composed of large imbricate, overlapping, likely silicified oval scales that are probably double-layered, with meshwork connecting the smooth unperforated layers. The cells are housed within this lorica, which consists of a single morphological form of silicified scales. There are no chloroplasts. There is a long, single posterior flagellum and a short, single anterior flagellum extending laterally. The cells have a diameter of approximately 10 micrometers. They are found within a radially symmetrical, pyriform lorica that is 1.5–2 times the cell diameter in length (smaller in dried specimens). This lorica consists of 10–15 large, overlapping, circular to slightly elliptical scales, each with a diameter of 3–6 micrometers. The scales lack ornamentation, and their distal surfaces are convex. The long, posterior, trailing flagellum is approximately 1–1.5 times the length of the lorica. The shorter anterior flagellum is generally shorter than the cell diameter. Both flagella emerge from an anterior flagellar pocket in a parallel arrangement.

==== Trivalvulariida ====
Testate amoebae with an organic test embedded with mineral and organic particles. The pseudopodia are granular and occasionally reticulose. Granular filopodia with rapid two-way streaming of granules and that may anastomose. Test smooth or with foreign particles. Pseudostome with three valves that can close the aperture. Pseudostome more or less triangular. Lacks a globule near the pseudostome.

== Ecology ==
Imbricates are soil protists. Euglyphids are mostly phagotrophic on bacteria. Many hyalospheniids need to prey at least partly on euglyphids and use the scales to build their own test.

== Evolution ==
It is thought that the shells of thecofiloseans and imbricates are independently evolved.

== Taxonomy ==
The class was proposed by Cavalier-Smith in Cavalier-Smith and Chao, 2003. It contained two orders, Thaumatomonadida and Euglyphida. The class was characterized by unique silica scales. Some trees weakly supported its monophyly, the ones that did not place the Thaumatomonadida as sister of Heteromitidae (now synonymized with Glissomonadida), equally weakly. Order Spongomonadida was in its own class Spongomonadea, and back then was not part of this class. Nucleariids were treated as class Cristidiscoidea and assigned to the phylum Choanozoa. Imbricatea was assigned to superclass Monadofilosa, subphylum Filosa and phylum Cercozoa.

In 2005, the class was proposed to be renamed to Silicofilosea and nucleariids were part of Mesomycetozoa. In 2011, the class Imbricatea was phylogenetically expanded to also include the scale-free groups Spongomonadida and a new order named Marimonadida. The incertae sedis genera Clautriavia and Discomonas and a new monotypic family named Nudifilidae including a new genus named Nudifila was also added as incertae sedis to this group. In 2012, Monadofilosa was ranked as an infraphylum. Later in 2012, the group was split to two new subclasses, Placoperla and Placonuda. Placoperla included two new superorders, Perlatia and Placofila. Perlatia included the orders Spongomonadida and the new Perlofilida. The species Acanthocystis ludibunda was proposed to be removed from Acanthocystis and put in a new monotypic genus named Acanthoperla. Acanthoperla was assigned to a new monotypic family named Acanthoperlidae. The family was assigned to Perlofilida, the other perlofilid family being Pompholyxophryidae (genus Pompholyxophrys). The superorder Placofila contained the orders Rotosphaerida (nucleariids) and Thaumatomonadida. The subclass Placonuda contained the order Euglyphida and new superorder Nudisarca. Nudisarca included the order Marimonadida and the incertae sedis family Nudifilidae. These changes were based on both phylogenetics and morphology.

Later in 2012, Adl et al. proposed that the nucleariids were separately assigned to Nucletmycea alongside the genus Rozella and Fungi. Imbricatea was also proposed to directly include the spongomonads, nudifilids (genus Nudifila), marimonads, silicofiloseans (thaumatomonads and euglyphids) and the incertae sedis genera Clautriavia and Discomonas. In 2013, nucleariids were proposed to be excluded from the superorder Placofila and grouped as a class Cristidiscoidea and assigned to a new monotypic subphylum named Paramycia. Paramycia was proposed to be one of the two subphyla of the phylum Choanozoa, the other being Choanofila. Later in 2013, Clautriavia was placed in its own incertae sedis family, Clautriaviidae. In 2014, the order Variglissida was named to include both the families Nudifilidae and Clautriaviidae, in the superorder Nudisarca. A new order Zoelucasida and a family Zoelucasidae was named for the genus Zoelucasa, the order was placed in the superorder Placofila, alongside the order Thaumatomonadida. Discomonas was treated as outside of Imbricatea, a new order Discomonadida and a family Discomonadidae was named for it.

In 2015, Ruggiero et al. did not use any superorders, they also put the orders Discocelida (genus Discocelia) and Discomonadida (genus Discomonas) in subclass Placonuda. In 2018, order Zoelucasida (genus Zoelucasa) was assigned to subclass Placonuda and order Discocelida was assigned to subclass Placoperla. Order Perlofilida was still used but listed as only probably in subclass Placoperla. Later in 2018, superorders were used again and the subclass Placonuda was expanded to include two more new superorders, Euglyphia and Discomonada. Euglyphia contained the orders Euglyphida and Zoelucasida, Discomonada contained the order Discomonadida. The order Discocelida was assigned to the superorder Placofila, the other order being Thaumatomonadida. A third subclass of Imbricatea was named as Krakenia, it contained a new order named Krakenida, which contained the family Krakenidae and genus Kraken.

In 2019, Adl et al. proposed a new classification: Imbricatea directly included spongomonads, marimonads, variglissids, silicofiloseans and the incertae sedis discomonads (genus Discomonas). The genera Discocelia and Kraken were placed outside of Imbricatea. Nucleariids were placed in Nucletmycea, not separately. Genus Pompholyxophrys was also placed in nucleariids. Nucletmycea also included Fungi, with the genus Rozella also placed in it. In 2020, a new order named Trivalvulariida containing the only new family named Trivalvulariidae was added to the superorder Euglyphia. Genus Leptogromia and a new genus Trivalvulariis were placed in the family Trivalvulariidae. Imbricatea, Silicofilosea, Placoperla, Placonuda, Perlatia, Placofila and Nudisarca are not monophyletic.

Current classification (Novel Clade 4 is now in Thecofilosea):

- Class Imbricatea (polyphyletic)
  - Order Spongomonadida
    - Family Spongomonadidae
  - Order Marimonadida
    - Family Auranticordidae
    - Family Cyranomonadidae
    - Family Pseudopirsoniidae
    - Family Abolliferidae
  - Order Variglissida (=Novel Clade 2)
    - Family Clautriaviidae
    - Family Nudifilidae
    - Family Quadriciliidae
  - Order Thaumatomonadida
    - Family Thaumatomonadidae
    - Family Peregriniidae
    - Family Esquamulidae
  - Superorder Euglyphia
    - Order Euglyphida
      - Family Cyphoderiidae
      - Family Paulinellidae
      - Suborder Euglyphina
        - Genus Tracheleuglypha
        - Family Assulinidae
        - Family Sphenoderiidae
        - Family Trinematidae
        - Family Euglyphidae
      - Incertae sedis
        - Genus Ampullataria
        - Genus Euglyphidion
        - Genus Heteroglypha
        - Genus Matsakision
        - Genus Pareuglypha
        - Genus Pileolus
    - Order Zoelucasida
      - Family Zoelucasidae
    - Order Trivalvulariida (=Novel Clade 3)
      - Family Trivalvulariidae
  - Novel Clade 1 (polyphyletic)
  - Incertae sedis
    - Superorder Discomonada
      - Order Discomonadida
        - Family Discomonadidae

== Phylogeny ==
An analysis in 2018, Ventrifilosa without Sarcomonadea, Imbricatea, Placoperla, Placonuda and Placonuda without Discomonas were recovered, but not Nudisarca:

- Ventrifilosa (2012)
  - Imbricatea
    - Placoperla
      - Spongomonadida
        Spongomonadidae
      - Thaumatomonadida
    - Placonuda
      - Discomonada
        Discomonadida
      - Placonuda (2012)
        - Variglissida
        - - Marimonadida
          - Euglyphia
            - Trivalvulariida
              Trivalvulariidae
            - Euglyphida
  - Thecofilosea

An analysis in 2025, Placonuda without Discomonas and Nudisarca were recovered (except a small portion of environmental samples), but not Imbricatea and Placoperla (Discocelia was recovered outside of Imbricatea in a taxon-wise significantly smaller analysis in the same work):

- Placonuda (2012)
  - Nudisarca
    - Marimonadida
      - - Pseudopirsoniidae
          Pseudopirsonia
        - Auranticordidae
          Auranticordis
      - Cyranomonadidae
        Cyranomonas
    - Variglissida
  - Euglyphia
    - - Paulinellidae
      - Cyphoderiidae
    - Euglyphina
      - - Euglyphidae
        - Trinematidae
      - Assulinidae
- - Thaumatomonadidae
  - - - Verrucomonadidae
        Verrucomonas
      - Discocelida
        Discoceliidae
    - Spongomonadida
      Spongomonadidae
  - - Discomonada
      Discomonadida
    - Peregriniidae

An analysis in 2026, Imbricatea, Placoperla, Placonuda and Nudisarca were not recovered:

- - - Thecofilosea
    - - Thaumatomonadida
      - Discomonada
        Discomonadida
  - - - - Novel Clade 6
        - Metromonadea
      - Novel Clade B
    - - Marimonadida
        - Auranticordidae
          Auranticordis
        - Abolliferidae
      - Novel Clade C
- - Pediglissa
    - - Glissomonadida (2018)
        - Glissomonadida
          - Sandonidae
          - Viridiraptoridae
        - Pansomonadida
      - Variglissida
    - Cercomonadida
  - Euglyphia
    - Euglyphina
    - - Paulinellidae
      - Cyphoderiidae
