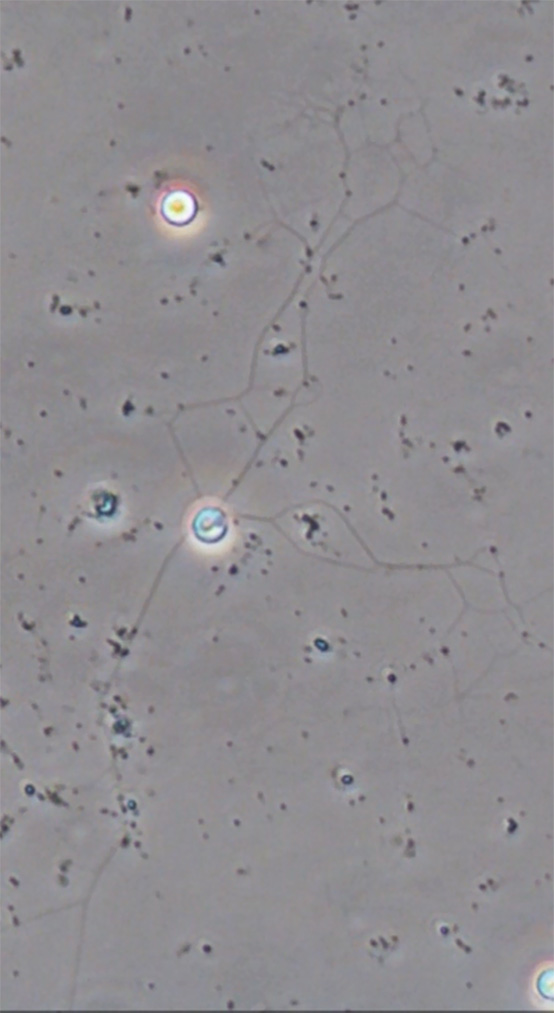
- Kraken carinae

Scientific classification
- Domain: Eukaryota
- Supergroup: Rhizaria
- Phylum: Cercozoa
- Subphylum: Filosa
- Infraphylum: Monadofilosa
- (unranked): incertae sedis
- Order: Krakenida; Dumack et al. 2017 ex Cavalier-Smith 2018
- Family: Krakenidae; Dumack et al. 2017
- Genus: Kraken; Dumack et al. 2016
- Species: K. carinae

Binomial name
- Kraken carinae Dumack et al. 2016

= Kraken carinae =

Species of single-celled organisms

Kraken is a genus of amoebae within the Cercozoa, containing the sole species Kraken carinae. These amoebae are characterized by a small round cell body and a network of thin and very long filopodia that can reach up to a mm in diameter. Kraken amoebae feed on bacteria and live in freshwater and soil systems.

== Etymology ==
Kraken was named after the German word Krakonen, which is the name used to refer to the Norse mythological monster. Kraken was named as such due to the method of feeding, in which the large network of branching filopodia grab bacteria and transport it to the cell body. The mythological monster Kraken was told to catch its prey with one of its many arms in a similar manner.

== History ==
Kraken is a recently discovered genus, having first been described in 2016 at the University of Koln. Thomas Cavalier-Smith established the phylum Cercozoa in 1998, which consists of flagellates and filose amoebae that are widely morphologically diverse. Genetic analysis and morphological characteristics place the genus Kraken as a cercozoan.

Currently, the genus consists of a single species, Kraken carinae. Through genetic analysis, ultrastructure data, and phylogenetic analysis, Kraken could not accurately be placed in an existing family, thus the new family Krakenidae was established. Currently, it is being considered to establish the new order Krakenida.

== Habitat and ecology ==
Kraken has only been observed and collected from Europe and Antarctica, though it is suspected to be distributed worldwide. Kraken is found in dry surface soil sediment, most prevalently in bacteria rich environments. Members have also been collected in freshwater lakes and aquatic moss pillars in the Antarctic region, suggesting a wider possible range of tolerance and habitability. The full extent of Kraken's preferred environment has not been studied.

Some organisms have also been collected in agricultural crops, particularly growing around wheat. This may suggest some ecosystem interactions that have yet to be studied further.

Kraken preys predominantly on bacteria.

== Description ==
Kraken consists of a round cell body, that is typically 7-9 μm in diameter. One large filopodium originates from the basal end of the cell body, and expands up to 300 μm. The filopodium branches extensively and forms a very large network, expanding the diameter of the organism to over 500 μm. The filopodia are thin, and taper at the ends. Kraken are very fragile. When the cell body is slightly mechanically disturbed in a lab setting, the filopodia retract close to the cell body. This often leads to cell death.

The filopodia are used to catch prey, mainly bacteria. The filopodia catch and attach prey through their vast network. These bacteria then glide through or along the filopodia to the cell body for digestion.

The cell body does not have any covering, instead it is surrounded by scales. These scales are formed in the cisternae of the Golgi apparatus, and carried to the surface. The scales are made of silica, are evenly distributed around the cell body, and do not overlap.

Typically Kraken has only one nucleus, though binucleate organisms have been observed. The organisms means of reproduction have not been studied, and whether it reproduces by sexual or asexual means is unknown. The nuclei contain one large round nucleolus each.

The cell body contains a contractile vacuole, a single large food vacuole, and several small granules. Also present is various numbers of mitochondria with flat shaped cristae. The periphery of the cell body is lined with extrusomes, and consists of an internal capsule that discharges and catches prey.

Kraken has the ability to encyst when dormant.

Kraken movement is relatively slow. There are 3 highly unusual methods of movement. The filopodium can grip the substrate and carry the cell body above the surface by a swaying locomotive action. The cell body can also move along a deeply branched filopodia. In a unique manner, Kraken can also completely disassemble its cell body and transport cell material through the filopodia network, where it is then deposited and reassembled elsewhere. This serves to move the cell body to the distal ends of the filopodia, which can then reposition and branch to new areas.
