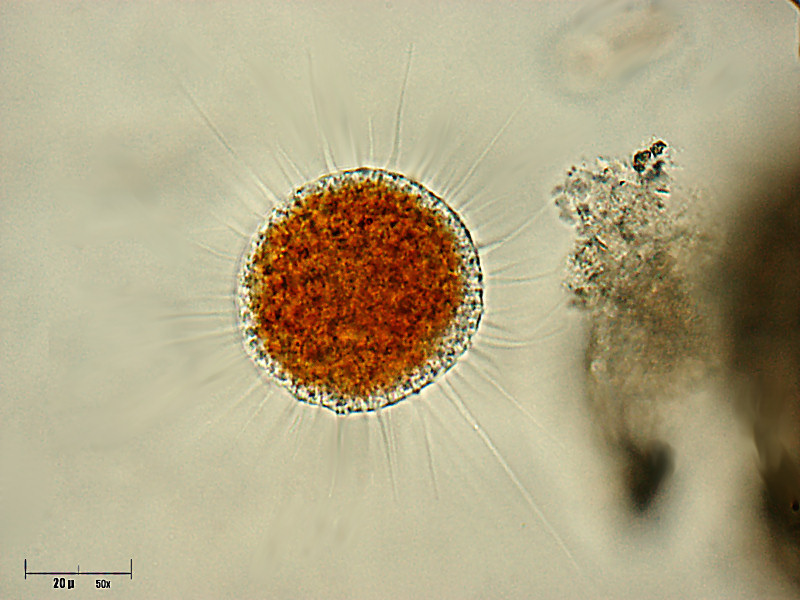
- Vampyrella lateritia (Aconchulinida: Vampyrellidae)

Scientific classification
- Domain: Eukaryota
- Clade: Sar
- Clade: Rhizaria
- Phylum: Endomyxa
- Class: Proteomyxidea; Lankester, 1885

Orders
- Reticulosida; Aconchulinida; Pseudosporida

= Proteomyxidea =

Class of single-celled organisms

Proteomyxidea is a class of Endomyxa. Although it is known to be paraphyletic, further research is needed before its classification can be improved.
