= Pseudodifflugia =

Scientific classification
- Domain: Eukaryota
- Clade: Sar
- Clade: Rhizaria
- Phylum: Cercozoa
- Subphylum: Filosa
- Class: Thecofilosea
- Order: Tectofilosida
- Family: Pseudodifflugiidae
- Genus: Pseudodifflugia; Schlumberger 1845

Genus of single-celled organisms

Pseudodifflugia is a genus of Endomyxa.

It was described in 1845.
