= Cryomonadida =

Scientific classification
- Domain: Eukaryota
- Clade: Sar
- Clade: Rhizaria
- Phylum: Cercozoa
- Subphylum: Filosa
- Class: Thecofilosea
- Order: Cryomonadida; Cavalier-Smith 1993

Type genus
- Cryothecomonas Thomsen et al. 1991

Families
- Rhogostomidae; Protaspidae

Synonyms
- Cryothecomonadida

Order of single-celled organisms

Cryomonadida is a group of heterotrophic Rhizaria that belongs to the Cercozoa.

== Characteristics ==
Members of the Cryomonadida are single-celled organisms that are surrounded by a shell comprising layers of organic material. They possess two unequally long flagella, and a single nucleus with a distinct nucleolus. They have a laterally located cytostome, from which pseudopodia arise.

== Systematics ==
The order Cryomonadida was erected in 1993 for the genus Cryothecomonas. In 2005, Sina Adl et al. did not include the order in their classification, but placed the genus incertae sedis among the Cercozoa. It became clear, however, that other genera, and taxa known only from environmental DNA, belonged in this group, and so in 2008 Jan Pawlowski placed the Cryomonadida as part of the core Cercozoa.

Within the Cercozoa, the sister taxon to Cryomonadida is Ebriacea; Pseudodifflugia is also closely related.

The following genera are included:

- Family Rhogostomidae Dumack et al. 2017
  - Sacciforma Dumack et al. 2017
  - Capsellina Penard 1909
  - Rhogostoma Belar 1921 (previously misidentified as Lecythium)
- Family Protaspidae Cavalier-Smith 1993 [Cryothecomonadidae Cavalier-Smith 1993]
  - Cryothecomonas Thomsen et al. 1991
  - Protaspa Cavalier-Smith 2011 [Protaspis Skuja 1939 non Bryant 1933]
  - Sinistermonas Lee 2015
