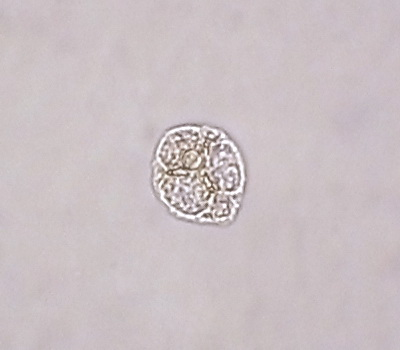
- Ebria tripartita

Scientific classification
- Domain: Eukaryota
- Supergroup: Rhizaria
- Phylum: Cercozoa
- Subphylum: Filosa
- Class: Thecofilosea
- Order: Ebriida; Deflandre 1936

Families
- †Ammodochiaceae; †Ditripodiaceae; Ebriaceae; Hermisinaceae

Synonyms
- Stereotestales; Ebriales Honigsberg 1964; Ebridea; Ebriidea; Ebriophyceae; Ebriacea

= Ebriid =

Group of protists

The Ebriales (see synonyms) is a group of phagotrophic flagellate eukaryotes present in marine coastal plankton communities worldwide. Ebria tripartita is one of two (possibly four) described extant species in the Ebriales. Members of this group are named for their idiosyncratic method of movement (ebrius, "drunk").

Ebriids are usually encountered in low abundance and have a peculiar combination of ultrastructural characters including a large nucleus with permanently condensed chromosomes and an internal skeleton composed of siliceous rods.

The taxonomic history of the group has been tumultuous and has included a variety of affiliations, such as silicoflagellates, dinoflagellates, 'radiolarians' and 'neomonads'. However, molecular phylogenies place them within Cercozoa.

== Taxonomy ==
Order Ebriales

- Family †Ammodochiaceae Deflandre 1950 [Ammodochiidae]
  - Genus †Ammodochium Hovasse 1932 [Tripodium Hovasse 1932]
- Family †Ditripodiaceae Deflandre 1951 [Ditripodiidae]
  - Genus †Ditripodium Hovasse 1932
  - Genus †Parathranium Hovasse 1932 [Dicladia Ehrenberg 1845]
  - Genus †Thranium Hovasse 1932
- Family Ebriaceae Lemmermann 1901 [Ebriidae Poche 1913]
  - Genus †Ebrinula Deflandre 1950
  - Genus Parebria Hovasse 1932
  - Genus Ebria Borgert 1891 [†Ebriella Deflandre 1934b; †Parammodochium Deflandre 1932; †Proebria Hovasse 1943]
- Family Hermisinaceae Hovasse 1943 [Ebriopsidaceae Deflandre 1650; Hermisinidae; Podamphoraceae Dangeard 1942]
  - Genus †Craniopsis Hovasse 1932 ex Frenguelli 1940
  - Genus †Ebriopsis Hovasse 1932
  - Genus †Falsebria Deflandre 1950
  - Genus †Haplohermesinum Hovasse 1943
  - Genus †Hermesinella Deflandre 1934
  - Genus †Hermesinopsis Deflandre 1934
  - Genus †Hovassebria Deflandre 1936 [Hovassebria Deflandre 1934 nomen nudum]
  - Genus †Micromarsupium Deflandre 1934
  - Genus †Parebriopsis Hovasse 1932
  - Genus †Podamphora Gemeinhardt 1931 [Podium Hovasse 1932]
  - Genus †Podamphoropsis Dumitrica 1973
  - Genus †Polyebriopsis Hovasse 1932
  - Genus †Pseudammodochium Hovasse 1932
  - Genus †Pseudomicromarsupium Busen & Wise 1977
  - Genus †Semantebria Frenguelli 1940
  - Genus †Spyrebria Frenguelli 1940
  - Genus Hermesinum Zacharias 1906 [Bosporella Hovasse 1931]
