= Proleptomonas =

Scientific classification
- Domain: Eukaryota
- Clade: Sar
- Clade: Rhizaria
- Phylum: Cercozoa
- Subphylum: Filosa
- Order: Glissomonadida
- Family: Proleptomonadidae; Howe et al. 2009
- Genus: Proleptomonas; Woodcock 1916
- Species: P. faecicola

Binomial name
- Proleptomonas faecicola Woodcock 1916

Genus of soil protists

Proleptomonas is a genus of coprophilic protists, containing the single species Proleptomonas faecicola. It belongs to the phylum Cercozoa, although it was previously considered the only free-living kinetoplastid. It is the only member of family Proleptomonadidae.
