= Pseudospora =

Scientific classification
- Domain: Eukaryota
- Clade: Sar
- Clade: Rhizaria
- Phylum: Cercozoa
- Subphylum: Filosa
- Clade: incertae sedis
- Order: Pseudosporida; Cavalier-Smith 1993
- Family: Pseudosporidae; Berlese in Saccardo 1888
- Genus: Pseudospora; Cienkowski 1865

Species
- See text

Synonyms
- Pseudosporopsis Scherffel 1925

Genus of single-celled organisms

Pseudospora is a genus of parasitic eukaryotes.

It includes the species Pseudospora volvocis.

== Taxonomy ==
- Order Pseudosporida Cavalier-Smith 1993
  - Family Pseudosporidae Berlese in Saccardo 1888
    - Genus Pseudospora Cienkowski 1865
      - Species P. aculeata Zopf 1884
      - Species P. bacillariacearum Zopf [Pseudosporopsis bacillariacearum (Zopf) Scherff. 1925]
      - Species P. benedeni De Bruyne 1889
      - Species P. edax De Bruyne 1889
      - Species P. eudorini Roskin 1927
      - Species P. cienkowskiana Sorokin 1877
      - Species P. leptoderma Scherff. 1925
      - Species P. lindstedtii Hartog 1890
      - Species P. maligna Zopf 1884
      - Species P. maxima Sorokin 1877
      - Species P. myzocytioides Scherff. 1925
      - Species P. nitellarum Cienkowski
      - Species P. parasitica Cienkowski 1858 [Monas parasitica Cienkowski 1858]
      - Species P. perforans
      - Species P. rotatoriorum Scherffel 1925
      - Species P. rovignensis Schussing 1929
      - Species P. subsalsa Dangead 1912
      - Species P. volvocis Cienkowski 1865
