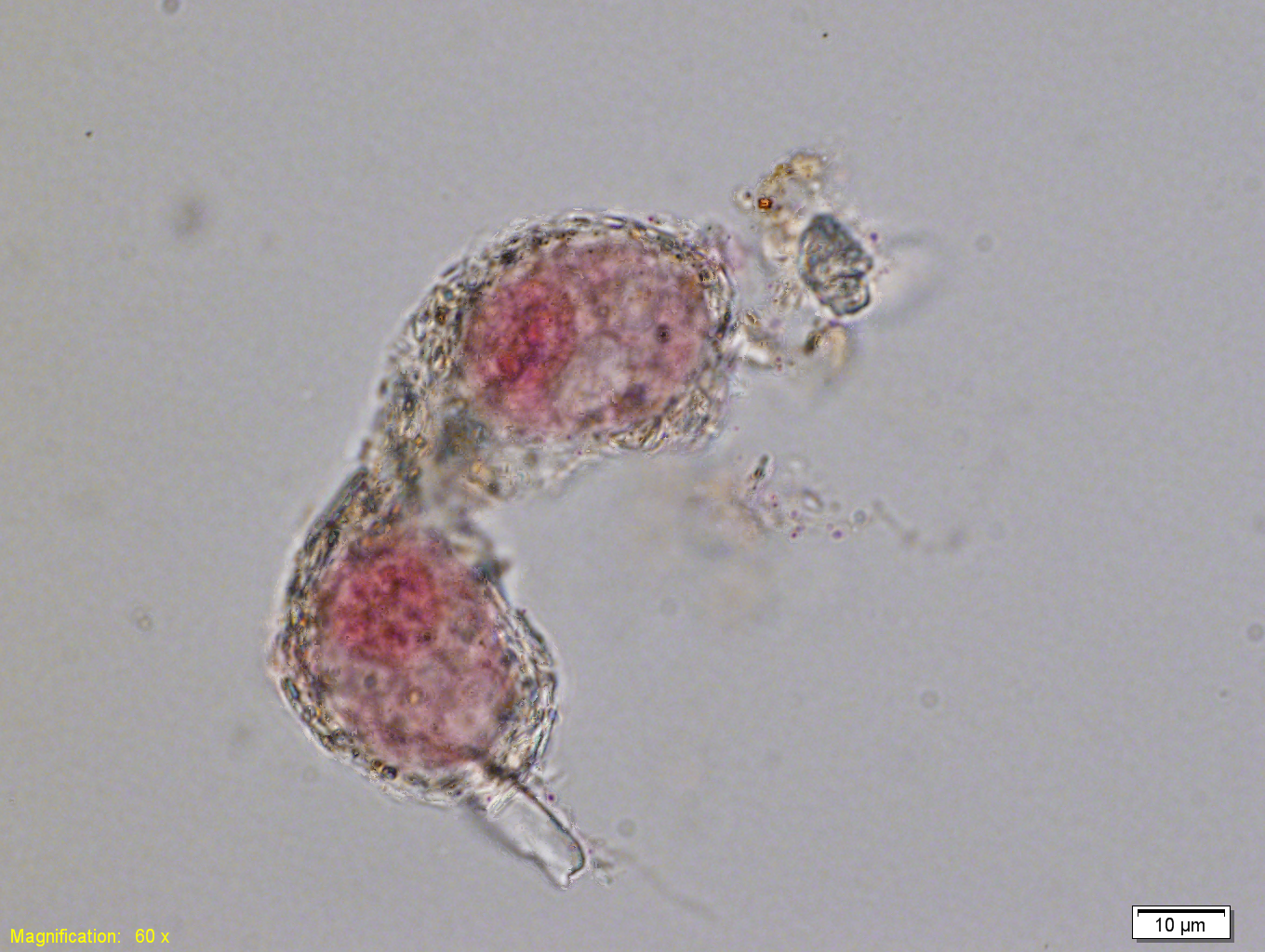
- Two preserved specimens of Capsellina sp. (Tectofilosida: Chlamydophryidae), from the Eugène Penard collection

Scientific classification
- Domain: Eukaryota
- Clade: Sar
- Clade: Rhizaria
- Phylum: Cercozoa
- Subphylum: Filosa
- Infraphylum: Monadofilosa
- Class: Thecofilosea; Cavalier-Smith, 2003 emend. 2011

Subgroups
- Tectofilosida; Phaeodarea; Cryomonadida; Ventricleftida; Ebriacea; Incertae sedis; Mataza

= Thecofilosea =

Class of single-celled organisms

Thecofilosea is a class of unicellular testate amoebae belonging to the phylum Cercozoa. They are amoeboflagellates, organisms with flagella and pseudopodia, distinguished from other cercozoa by their scale-lacking test composed of organic material. They are closely related to the Imbricatea, a group of testate amoebae with tests composed of inorganic silica scales.

== Cell structure ==
Thecofilosean organisms evolved from an ancestor with a robust extracellular theca made of organic material, unlike most other Cercozoa, which are usually naked or have inorganic silica scales. They present thin pseudopodia (filopodia) that emerge from a ventral groove. They also have two flagella which have been secondarily lost in Rhizaspidae and the tectofilosid amoebae, and are restricted to zoospores within the phaeodarian amoebae. They ancestrally glide on their posterior flagellum only and have a benthic distribution, but many lineages have evolved as planktonic swimmers, like the Ebriacea which have lost their pseudopodia.

The thecofilosean theca or test has perforations for flagella and pseudopodia. In the phaeodarian amoebae, the test has three perforations. Although they lack silica scales, unlike many Imbricatea, they present a hollow silica endoskeleton in all ebriids and most phaeodarians.

== Evolution ==
=== External evolution ===
Thecofilosea is a clade or monophyletic group. It belongs to the subphylum Monadofilosa, a group of cercozoan classes that evolved after the early divergence of Reticulofilosa. Thecofilosea is the only group of testate cercozoan amoebae with ancestrally organic scale-lacking shells, while all the Imbricatea (to which the scale-bearing Kraken belongs) have non-organic silica scaled tests. The Thecofilosea appear to have evolved from the Imbricatea, a group previously considered monophyletic but based on new analyses seems paraphyletic to Thecofilosea. Their common ancestor carried scales in its theca and no organic cement, a trait lost in Thecofilosea in favour of an organic theca without scales.

- Cercozoa (=Filosa)
  - - Monadofilosa
      - - - Thecofilosea (no scales, organic)
          - classical Imbricatea (silica scales)
        - Kraken (silica scales)
      - Sarcomonadea (naked)
    - Granofilosea
  - Chlorarachnea

An earlier analysis that recovers the Kraken within Sarcomonadea, a group of naked amoebae, proposes the unlikely possibility that not only the common ancestor of Imbricatea+Thecofilosea, but also the common ancestor of all Filosa, already bore inorganic silica scales in its test. In this scenario, both Thecofilosea and Sarcomonadea would have lost their scales independently.

== Taxonomy ==
The class Thecofilosea was created in 2003 by protozoologist Cavalier-Smith to accommodate the testate orders Cryomonadida and Tectofilosida. They were first described as uninucleate cells surrounded by an organic flexible tectum (in the case of Tectofilosida) or a rigid test (in Cryomonadida) with one or two apertures for filopodia, either two flagella or none, and tubular mitochondrial cristae. It was later emended in 2011 by the same author, to include Ventricleftida, Ebriida and Phaeodaria. Finally, the elusive Mataza was added to the class in its own order Matazida.

Two different classification schemes are in place, despite containing the same orders.

Cavalier-Smith et al. (2018)	Adl et al. (2019)
Subclass Ventricleftia; Order Ventricleftida; Subclass Eothecia; Order Matazida; Order Ebriida; Order Cryomonadida; Subclass Phaeodaria; Order Eodarida; Order Opaloconchida; Subclass Tectosia; Order Tectofilosida	Incertae sedis: Mataza; Phaeodarea; Phaeoconchia; Phaeocystina; Phaeogromia; Phaeosphaeria; Cryomonadida; Ventricleftida; Tectofilosida; Ebriacea
