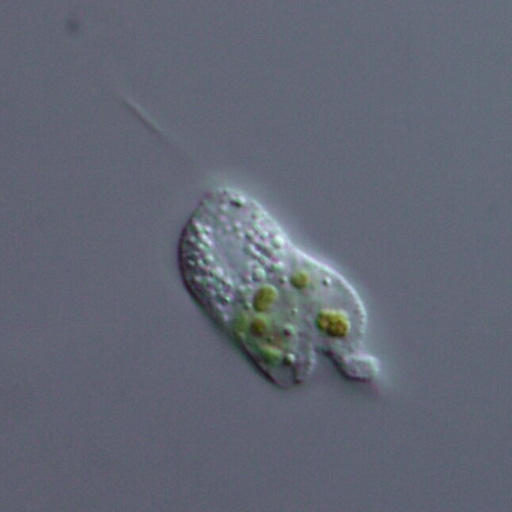
- Cercomonas

Scientific classification
- Domain: Eukaryota
- Supergroup: Rhizaria
- Phylum: Cercozoa; Cavalier-Smith 1998, emend. Adl et al. 2005

Subgroups
- Filosa; "Endomyxa"; Aquavolonida (=Novel Clade 10); Tremula (=Novel Clade 11); Incertae sedis; Dictiomyxa; Myxodictyium; Pontomyxa; Protomyxa; Protogenes; Rhizoplasma; Bereczkya; Zoelucasa

Diversity
- ~600 species

Synonyms
- Rhizopoda Dujardin 1835 stat. n. Haeckel 1866, emend. Cavalier-Smith 1996

= Cercozoa =

Group of single-celled organisms

Cercozoa is a phylum of diverse single-celled eukaryotes. They lack shared morphological characteristics at the microscopic level, and are instead united by molecular phylogenies of rRNA and actin or polyubiquitin. They were the first major eukaryotic group to be recognized mainly through molecular phylogenies. They are the natural predators of many species of bacteria. They are closely related to the phylum Retaria, comprising amoeboids that usually have complex shells, and together form a supergroup called Rhizaria.

== Characteristics ==
The group includes most amoeboids and flagellates that feed by means of filose pseudopods. These may be restricted to part of the cell surface, but there is never a true cytostome or mouth as found in many other protozoa. They show a variety of forms and have proven difficult to define in terms of structural characteristics, although their unity is strongly supported by phylogenetic studies.

== Diversity ==
Some cercozoans are grouped by whether they are "filose" or "reticulose" in the behavior of their cytoskeleton when moving:

- Filose, meaning their pseudopods develop as filopodia. For example:
  - Euglyphids, filose amoebae with shells of siliceous scales or plates, which are commonly found in soils, nutrient-rich waters, and on aquatic plants.
  - Chlorarachniophytes, set apart by the presence of chloroplasts bound by four membranes and still possess a vestigial nucleus, called a nucleomorph. As such, they have been of great interest to researchers studying the endosymbiotic origins of organelles.
  - Tectofilosids, filose amoebae that produce organic shells.
  - Cercomonads, common soil-dwelling amoeboflagellates.
  - Granofiloseans, also comprising Desmothoracida.
  - Phaeodarians, marine protozoa previously considered radiolarians.
- Reticulose, meaning they form a reticulating net of pseudopods. For example:
  - Gromia, a shelled amoeba.

== Ecology ==
As well as being highly diverse in morphology and physiology, Cercozoa also shows high ecological diversity. The phylum Cercozoa includes many of the most abundant and ecologically significant protozoa in soil, marine and freshwater ecosystems.

Soil-dwelling cercozoans are one of the dominant groups of free-living eukaryotic microorganisms found in temperate soils, accounting for around 30% of identifiable protozoan DNA in arid or semi-arid soils and 15% in more humid soils. In transcriptomic analyses they account for 40-60% of all identifiable protozoan RNA found in forest and grassland soils. They also comprise 9-24% of all operational taxonomic units found in the ocean floor.

Some cercozoa are coprophilic or coprozoic, meaning they use feces as a source of nutrients or as transport through animal hosts. The faecal habitat is an understudied reservoir of microbial eukaryotic diversity, dominated by amoeboflagellates from the phylum Cercozoa. Strongly coprophilic examples of cercozoans are the flagellates Cercomonas, Proleptomonas and Helkesimastix, and the sorocarpic amoeba Guttulinopsis. Many new cercozoan lineages, especially among sarcomonads, have been discovered through phylogenetic sampling of feces because they appear preferentially in this medium.

Cercozoan bacterivores (i.e. predators of bacteria) are highly diverse and important in the plant phyllosphere, the leaf surfaces of plants. Particularly sarcomonads, with their ability to cyst, feed and multiply within hours, are perfectly adapted to the fluctuating environmental factors in the phyllosphere. Their predation causes shifts in the bacterial communities: they reduce populations of alphaproteobacteria and betaproteobacteria, which are less resistant to their grazing, in favour of other bacterial populations such as gammaproteobacteria.

== Systematics ==
Paraphyletic Cercozoa

- Rhizaria
  - Filosa
    - Reticulofilosa
    - Monadofilosa
  - - Endomyxa
    - Retaria
      - Foraminifera
      - Radiolaria

Monophyletic Cercozoa

- Rhizaria
  - Cercozoa
    - Filosa
      - Chlorarachnea
      - Monadofilosa
    - - Endomyxa
      - Aquavolonida
  - Retaria
    - - Foraminifera
      - Polycystinea
    - Acantharea

Cercozoa is composed of two groups: Filosa and Endomyxa. With Heliomorpha added, Endomyxa is polyphyletic. Recent phylogenomic analyses with better sampling recovered a sister relationship between Filosa and Endomyxa. According to multigene phylogenetic analyses, Monadofilosa is a robust clade with its analyzed groups. Some works proposed to exclude Endomyxa from Cercozoa and transferring it to Retaria or keeping it directly under Rhizaria. A more recent phylogenomic analysis recovered both Monadofilosa and Chlorarachnea as monophyletic within the clade Filosa.

In addition to the known Granofilosea, Chlorarachnea and Monadofilosa, a variety of clades inside Cercozoa have been discovered in other analyses and have slowly been described and named, such as Tremulida (previously known as Novel Clade 11) and Aquavolonida (Novel Clade 10). Some genera have been classified as incertae sedis within the group. Pseudospora is in Filosa when Filosa is used.

Although AlgaeBase follows a different scheme than such as those in Adl et al., it lists six hundred cercozoan species.

== Gallery ==
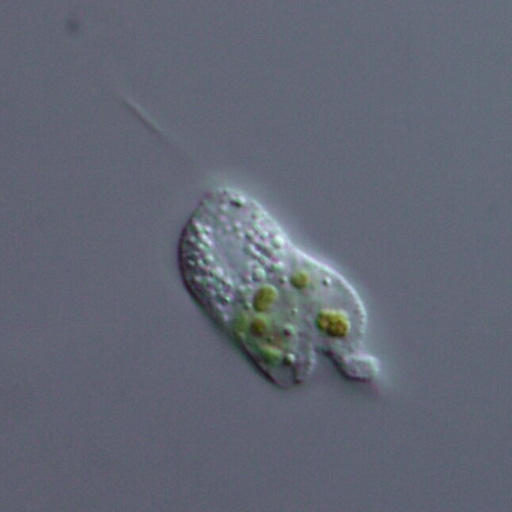
Cercomonas sp. (Cercozoa: Cercomonadida)

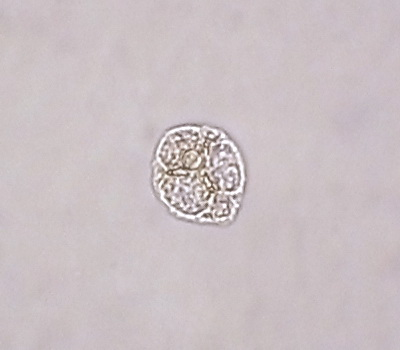
Ebria sp. (Cercozoa: Thecofilosea)

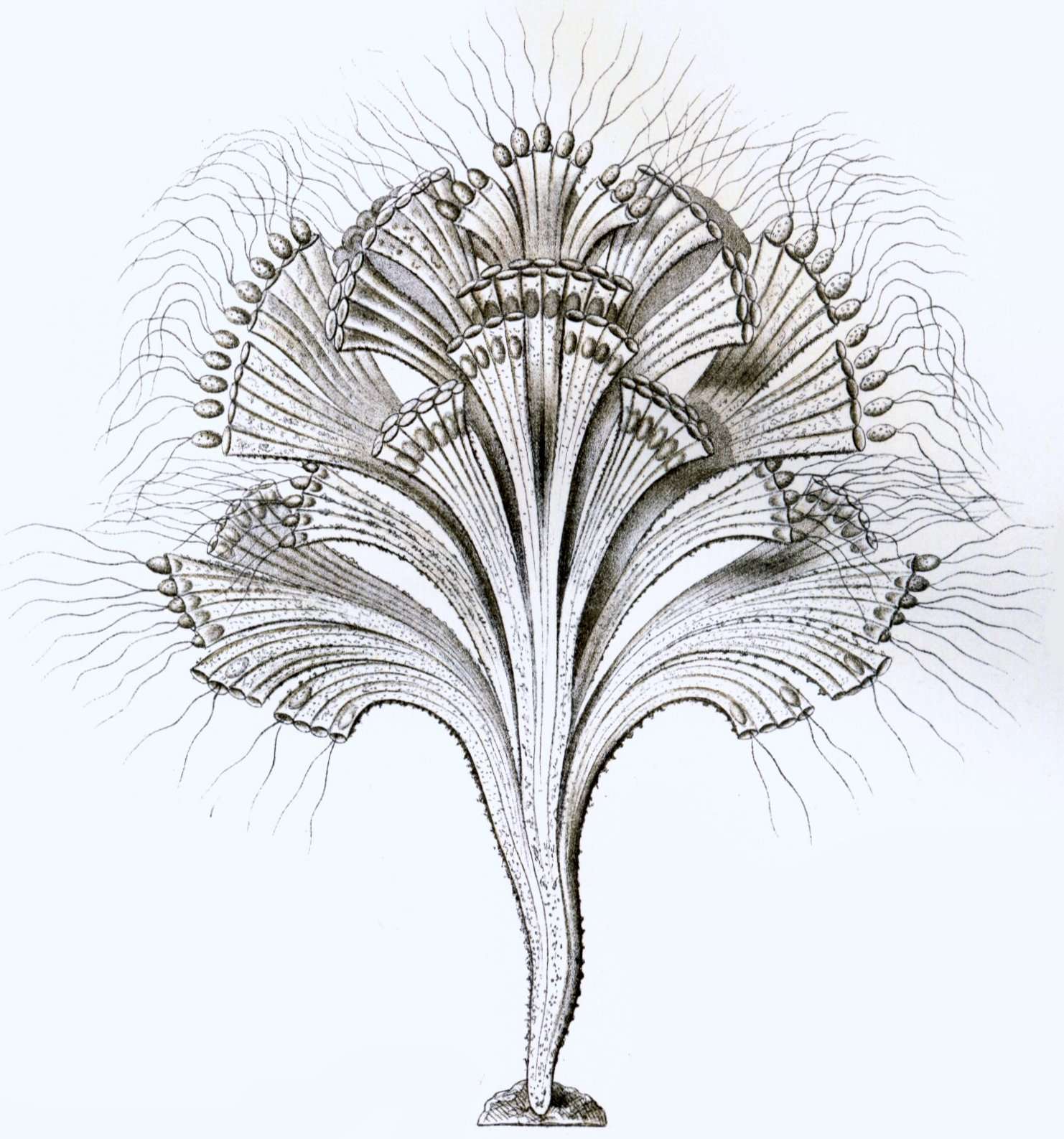
Rhipidodendron sp. (Cercozoa: Imbricatea)

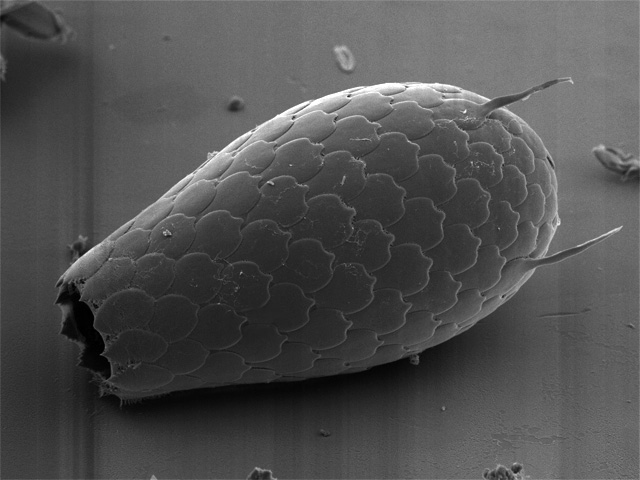
Euglypha sp. (Cercozoa: Imbricatea)

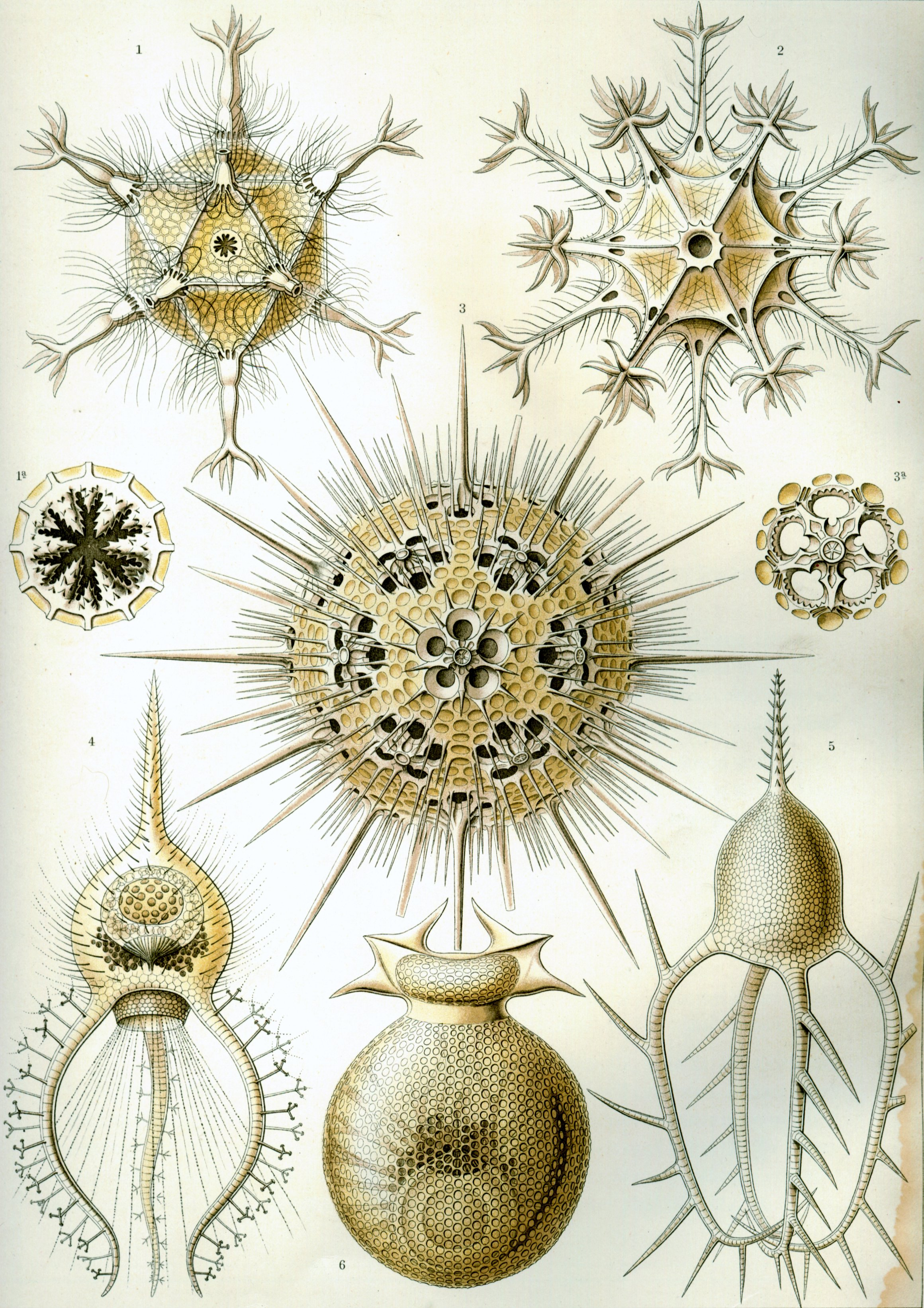
Phaeodarians (Cercozoa: Thecofilosea)

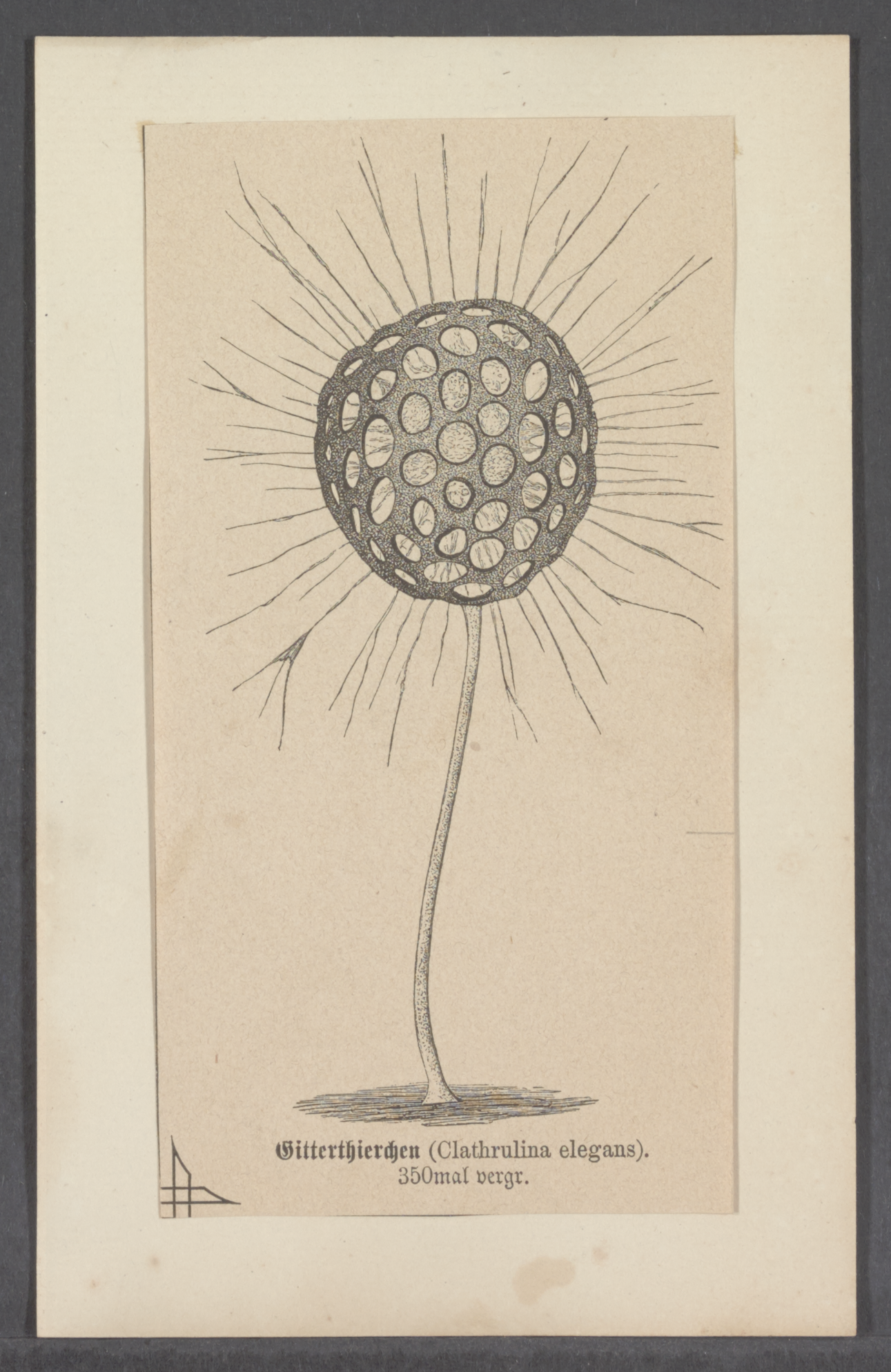
Clathrulina elegans (Cercozoa: Granofilosea)

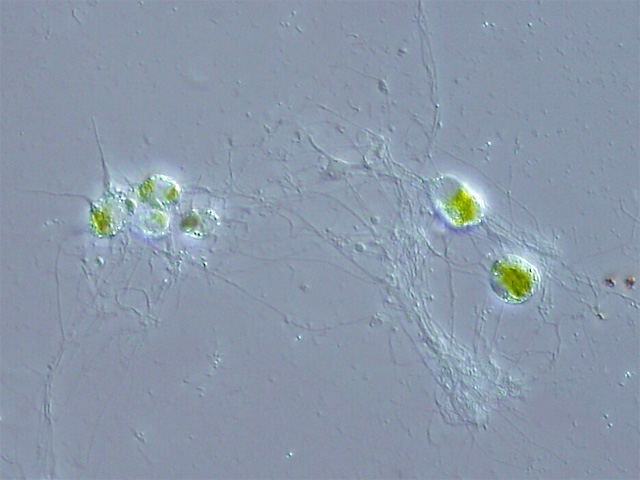
Chlorarachnion sp. (Cercozoa: Chlorarachnea)

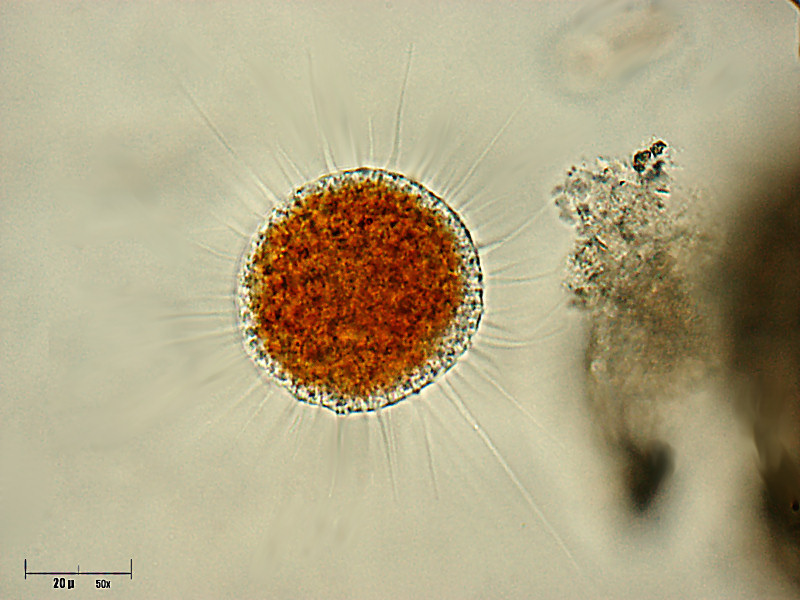
Vampyrella sp. (Cercozoa: Vampyrellidea)

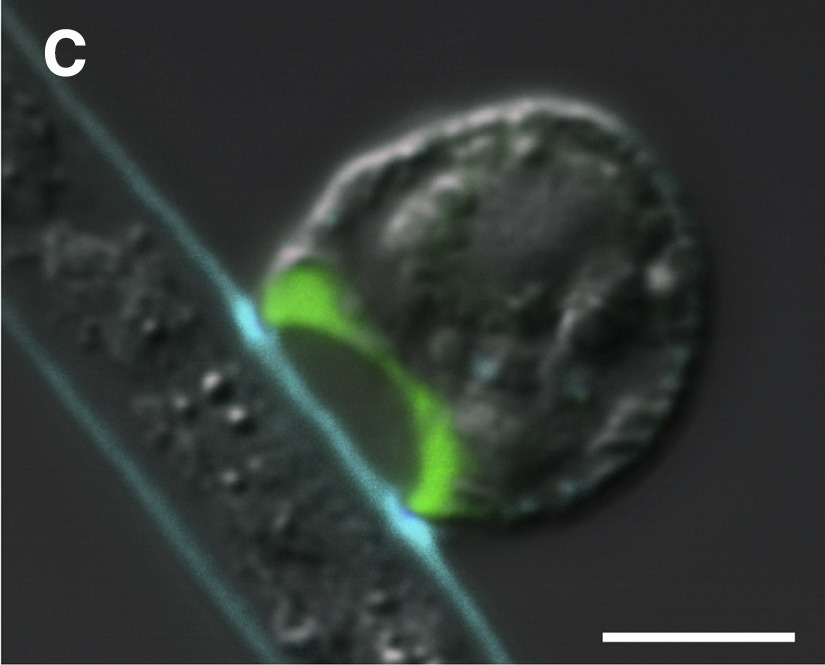
Orciraptor agilis (Cercozoa: Glissomonadida) attacking Mougeotia sp. (Zygnemataceae)

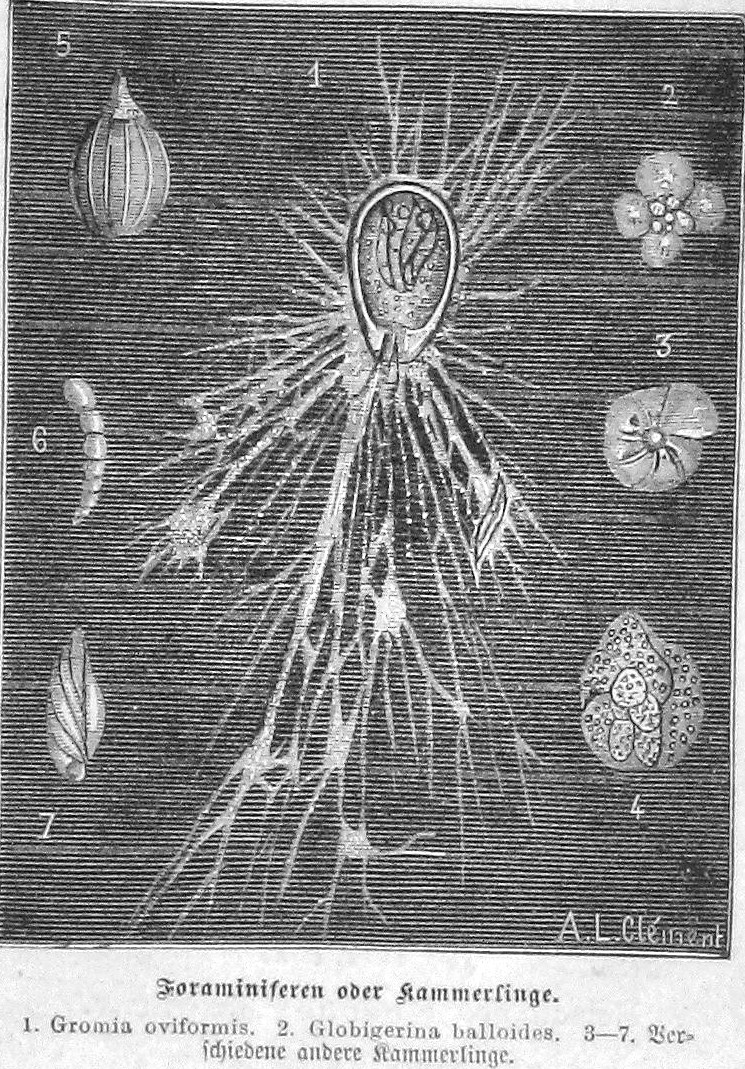
Gromia (Cercozoa: Gromiida)

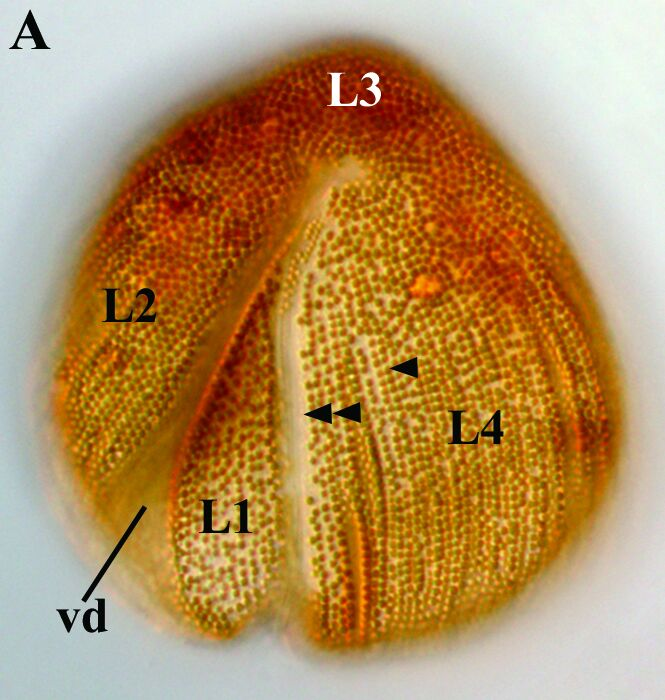
Auranticordis (Cercozoa: Imbricatea)
