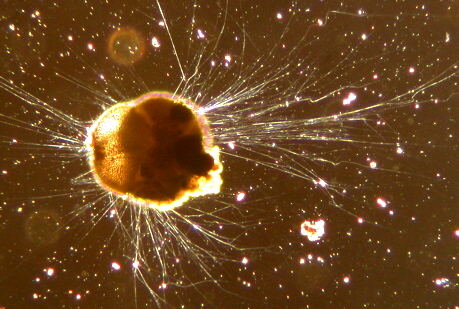
- Ammonia tepida (Foraminifera)

Scientific classification
- Domain: Eukaryota
- Clade: Sar
- Supergroup: Rhizaria; Cavalier-Smith 2002

Subgroups
- Cercozoa; Retaria; Foraminifera; Radiolaria; Incertae sedis; Gymnosphaerida

= Rhizaria =

Rhizaria Temporal range: 650 Mya (Neoproterozoic) - Present

Clade of protists

The Rhizaria are a diverse and species-rich clade of mostly unicellular eukaryotes. Except for the chlorarachniophytes and three species in the genus Paulinella in the phylum Cercozoa, they are all non-photosynthetic, but many Foraminifera and Radiolaria have a symbiotic relationship with unicellular algae. A multicellular form, Guttulinopsis vulgaris, a cellular slime mold, has been described. This group was first used by Cavalier-Smith in 2002, although the term "Rhizaria" had been long used for clades within the currently recognized taxon.

Being described mainly from rDNA sequences, they vary considerably in form, having no clear morphological distinctive characters (synapomorphies), but for the most part they are amoeboids with filose, reticulose, or microtubule-supported pseudopods. In the absence of an apomorphy, the group is ill-defined, and its composition has been very fluid. Some Rhizaria possess mineral exoskeletons (thecae or loricas), which are in different clades within Rhizaria made out of opal (SiO_{2}), celestite (SrSO_{4}), or calcite (CaCO_{3}).

Certain species can attain sizes of more than a centimeter with some species being able to form cylindrical colonies approximately 1 cm in diameter and greater than 1 m in length. They feed by capturing and engulfing prey with the extensions of their pseudopodia; forms that are symbiotic with unicellular algae contribute significantly to the total primary production of the ocean.

== Groups ==
The three main groups of Rhizaria are:

- Cercozoa – various amoebae and flagellates, usually with filose pseudopods and common in soil
- Foraminifera – amoeboids with reticulose pseudopods, common as marine benthos
- Radiolaria – amoeboids with axopods, common as marine plankton

A few other groups may be included in the Cercozoa, but some trees appear closer to the Foraminifera. These are the Phytomyxea and Ascetosporea, parasites of plants and animals, respectively, and the peculiar amoeba Gromia. The different groups of Rhizaria are considered close relatives based mainly on genetic similarities, and have been regarded as an extension of the Cercozoa. The name Rhizaria for the larger group was introduced by Cavalier-Smith in 2002, who also included the centrohelids and Apusozoa.

A noteworthy order that belongs to Ascetosporea is the Mikrocytida. These are parasites of oysters. This includes the causative agent of Denman Island Disease, Mikrocytos mackini a small (2−3 μm diameter) amitochondriate protistan.

== History ==
Similarities between various Rhizaria organisms have been noticed since the 19th century. In his 1861 classification of the Rhizopoda (amoebae), the zoologist William B. Carpenter proposed the order Reticularia, which consisted of Foraminifera and Gromiida on the basis of their very similar thin, reticulose pseudopodia with granules circulating inside. However, the idea that these organisms and others such as Radiolaria were all related to one another emerged rather recently, with the help of molecular phylogenetics and advanced microscopy techniques in the late 20th century.

== Evolutionary relationships ==
Rhizaria are part of the SAR (Stramenopiles, Alveolates, Rhizaria), a grouping that had been presaged in 1993 through a study of mitochondrial morphologies. SAR is currently placed in the Diaphoretickes along with Archaeplastida, Cryptista, Haptista, and several minor clades.

Historically, many rhizarians were considered animals because of their motility and heterotrophy. However, when a simple animal-plant dichotomy was superseded by a recognition of additional kingdoms, taxonomists generally placed amoebae in the kingdom Protista. When scientists began examining the evolutionary relationships among eukaryotes in the 1970s, it became clear that the kingdom Protista was paraphyletic. Rhizaria appear to share a common ancestor with Stramenopiles and Alveolates forming part of the SAR super assemblage. Rhizaria has been supported by molecular phylogenetic studies as a monophyletic group. Biosynthesis of 24-isopropyl cholestane precursors in various rhizarians suggests a relevant ecological role already during the Ediacaran.

=== Phylogeny ===
Rhizaria is a monophyletic group composed of two groups: Cercozoa and Retaria. The following cladogram depicts the evolutionary relationships between the major rhizarian classes, and is based on phylogenomic analyses published between 2018 and 2026. The Cercozoa part is based whole from the 2026 analysis. In that analysis, classes Sarcomonadea, Imbricatea and Gromiidea were not monophyletic.

- Rhizaria
  - Cercozoa
    - Filosa
      - - Monadofilosa
          - - - - - Thecofilosea
                  - - Thaumatomonadida (Imbricatea in part)
                    - Discomonadida (Imbricatea in part)
                - - Metromonadea
                  - Marimonadida (Imbricatea in part)
              - - Pediglissa
                  - - - Glissomonadida (Sarcomonadea in part)
                      - Pansomonadida (Sarcomonadea in part)
                    - Variglissida (Imbricatea and Sarcomonadea in part)
                  - Cercomonadida (Sarcomonadea in part)
                - Euglyphia (Imbricatea in part)
            - Sainouroidea (=Helkesea)
          - Paracercomonadida (Sarcomonadea in part)
        - Granofilosea
      - Chlorarachnea
    - - Endomyxa
        - Marimyxia
          - - Gromiida (Gromiidea in part)
            - Ascetosporea
          - Reticulosida (Gromiidea in part)
        - Proteomyxia
          - Vampyrellidea
          - Phytomyxea
      - Skiomonadea
  - Retaria
    - Foraminifera
      - Tubothalamea
      - - Monothalamea
        - Globothalamea
    - Acantharea
    - Polycystinea

== Sexual cycle ==
Complete sexual life cycles have been demonstrated for two lineages (Foraminifera and Gromia) and direct evidence for karyogamy or meiosis has been observed in five lineages (Euglyphida, Thecofilosea, Chlorarachnea, Plasmodiophorida and Phaeodaria). In particular, the Foraminifera are marine amoebae that are defined by a dynamic network of pseudopodia, and the production of intricate shells. These amoeba have complex sexual life cycles with meiosis and gamete production occurring at separate stages.
