= Cryptofilida =

Scientific classification
- Domain: Eukaryota
- Clade: Sar
- Clade: Rhizaria
- Phylum: Cercozoa
- Subphylum: Filosa
- Class: Granofilosea
- Order: Cryptofilida; Cavalier-Smith & Bass in Bass et al. 2009

Families
- Mesofilidae; Nanofilidae

Order of protists

Cryptofilida (from Latin crypto 'hidden' and fila 'threads') is an order of small heterotrophic protists in the phylum Cercozoa. They are filose amoebae that lack cilia and gliding, and are instead characterized by movement through branching or unbranched granular filopodia that are appressed to the substrate during their feeding.

In studies on the impact of conventional soil management, Cryptofilida were identified as ecological indicators.

== Phylogeny and taxonomy ==
=== Phylogeny ===
Cryptofilida is an order inside Granofilosea, and is phylogenetically related to Limnofilida, a group with similar amoeboid protists. However, the exact relationships between the granofilosean clades are still unresolved. Two outcomes are shown here from the 2009 analysis that identified the group for the first time:

- Granofilosea
  - - - - - - Desmothoracida
              - Hedriocystis
              - Clathrulina
            - Novel Clade Gran-4
          - Novel Clade Gran-2
        - Novel Clade Gran-3
      - Leucodictyida
    - - Mesofilidae
        Mesofila
      - - - Nanofilidae
            Nanofila
          - Novel Clade Gran-1
        - Novel Clade Gran-6
  - Limnofilida
    Limnofilidae

- Granofilosea
  - - - - - - - - Desmothoracida
                  - Hedriocystis
                  - Clathrulina
                - Novel Clade Gran-4
              - Novel Clade Gran-2
            - Novel Clade Gran-3
          - - Nanofilidae
              Nanofila
            - Novel Clade Gran-1
        - Novel Clade Gran-6
      - Mesofilidae
        Mesofila
    - - Limnofilida
        Limnofilidae
      - Leucodictyida
  - Novel Clade Gran-5

A more recent analysis shows this result:

- Granofilosea
  - - - - Novel Clade Gran-5
        - - - Desmothoracida
              - Hedriocystis
              - Clathrulina
            - - Novel Clade Gran-4
              - Novel Clade Gran-2
          - Novel Clade Gran-3
      - - - - - Novel Clade Gran-1
              - Nanofilidae
                Nanofila
            - Novel Clade Gran-6
          - Mesofilidae
            Mesofila
    - Leucodictyida
      - Massisteria
      - Minimassisteria
  - Limnofilida
    Limnofilidae

=== Taxonomy ===
The order contains two families with one species each.

- Family Mesofilidae Cavalier-Smith & Bass in Bass et al. 2009
  - Mesofila Cavalier-Smith & Bass in Bass et al. 2009
    - Mesofila limnetica Cavalier-Smith & Bass in Bass et al. 2009
- Family Nanofilidae Cavalier-Smith & Bass in Bass et al. 2009
  - Nanofila Cavalier-Smith & Bass in Bass et al. 2009
    - Nanofila marina Cavalier-Smith & Bass in Bass et al. 2009
