= Ultrastructural identity =

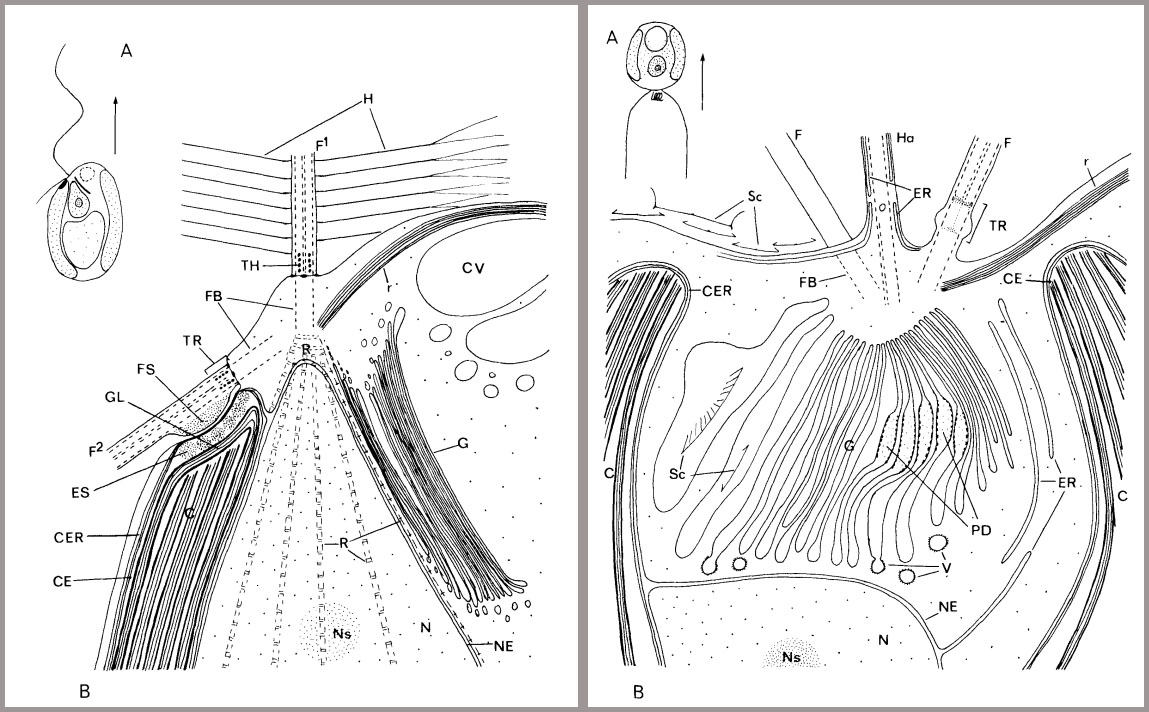
David Hibberd's comparison of the ultrastructural identities of a typical chrysophyte and a typical haptophyte

Ultrastructural identity is a concept in biology. It asserts that evolutionary lineages of eukaryotes in general and protists in particular can be distinguished by complements and arrangements of cellular organelles. These ultrastructural components can be visualized by electron microscopy.

The concept emerged following the application of electron microscopy to protists.

== Protists ==
Early ultrastructural studies revealed that many previously accepted groupings of protists based on optical microscopy included organisms with differing cellular organelles. Those groups included amoebae, flagellates, heliozoa, radiolaria, sporozoa, slime molds, and chromophytic algae. They were deemed likely to be polyphyletic, and their inclusion in efforts to assemble a phylogenetic tree would cause confusion. As an example of this work, German cell biologist Christian Bardele established unexpected diversity with the simply organized heliozoa. His work made it evident that heliozoa were not monophyletic and subsequent studies revealed that the heliozoa was composed of seven types of organisms: actinophryids, centrohelids, ciliophryids, desmothoracids, dimporphids, gymnosphaerids and taxopodids.

A critical advance was made by British phycologist David Hibberd. He demonstrated that two types of chromophytic algae, previously presumed to be closely related, had different organizations that were revealed by electron microscopy. The number and organization of locomotor organelles differed (chrysophyte - two flagella; haptophyte - two flagella and haponema), the surfaces of which differed (chrysophyte - with tripartite flagellar hairs now regarded as apomorphic for stramenopiles; haptophyte - naked), as did the transitional zone between axoneme and basal body (chrysophyte with helix); as did flagellar anchorage systems; presence or absence of embellishments on the cell surface (chrysophyte - naked; haptophyte - with scales), plastids especially eyespot, location and functions of dictyosomes, inter alia. This careful study prompted further examination of algal and flagellate organization. Protozoologists Brugerolle and Patterson were the first to use the term 'ultrastructural identity' in discussing the differences between ciliates and a lookalike protist, Stephanopogon. Patterson later applied the concept to all eukaryotes, classifying their diversity into 71 types, each without clear sister group affinities. A further 200 or so genera that had not yet been studied by electron microscopy were listed.

The catalog of groups with distinctive ultrastructural identities has been used as a base-line for efforts to build a stable tree for all eukaryotes using molecular data.

An indirect benefit of the focus on ultrastructural characters was that it allowed synapomorphies to be identified for emerging lineages. Molecular protistologist Gunderson and colleagues established that dinoflagellates, apicomplexa and ciliates were likely related. They, and some related flagellates, were shown to share a distinctive system of sacs or alveoli under the cell membrane, and because of this were given the name Alveolates. Similarly, tripartite tubular hairs attached to various algae, fungi and protozoa provided the synapomorphy for the 'stramenopiles' (straw-hairs) A distinctive flagellar root system that caused grooving on their cell surface was treated as a synapomorphy of the excavate flagellates.
