= Heliomonadida =

Scientific classification (obsolete)
- Domain: Eukaryota
- Supergroup: Rhizaria
- Phylum: Cercozoa
- Subphylum: Filosa
- Class: Granofilosea
- Order: Heliomonadida; Cavalier-Smith 1993

Families
- Heliomorphidae; Tetradimorphidae

Diversity
- 4 species

Synonyms
- Dimorphida Siemensma 1991

Obsolete order of single-celled organisms

The Heliomonadida (formerly Dimorphida) are a small obsolete group of heliozoan amoebae that are unusual in possessing two or more flagella throughout their life cycle. They have an axoplast, a region of the cell that functions as the microtubule organizing center, as well as tubular mitochondrial cristae.

Heliomonads were proposed first as relatives of centrohelids, but based on finer ultrastructural data they were considered cercozoans. Their classification changed considerably during the 2010s, and were temporarily split across Cercozoa, Heliozoa and Cryptista. Eventually, the two original genera, Heliomorpha (=Dimorpha pro parte) and Tetradimorpha, were reestablished as members of Cercozoa, and a separate genus Tetrahelia was described for the species placed in Cryptista. The genus Acinetactis was proposed as a heliomonad for some time, but was later found to be more similar to Aurigamonas, a pansomonad.

== Description ==
Heliomonads are heliozoa, a type of single-celled organisms with axopodia, stiff projections radiating from the cell and supported by microtubules. Their cells have flagella, whip-like structures for movement: some species have two (as in Heliomorpha), while others have four (as in Tetradimorpha). As such, they are helioflagellates, similarly to pedinellids.

== Classification history ==
Dimorphid heliozoa were originally proposed as an order Dimorphida by Ferry Siemensma in 1991. It originally included the freshwater genera Dimorpha, with two flagella, and Tetradimorpha, with four flagella. Their taxonomic affiliation was completely unclear.

Some authors in the 1980s proposed Dimorpha and Tetradimorpha as the missing evolutionary links between centrohelid heliozoa, which lack flagella, and other flagellates; they were even proposed as centrohelids. This view was based on their shared presence of the axoplast (known as centroplast in centrohelids) as the microtubule organizing center (MTOC) from which axonemes originate, as well as the presence of kinetocysts with a similar structure. However this view was rejected, as centrohelids are unique from any other group of eukaryotes and present several fundamental differences. For example, the mitochondrial cristae of dimorphids are tubular, as opposed to the flat, ribbon-like cristae of centrohelids. The respective MTOCs and kinetocysts, while superficially similar, are also profoundly different. The centrohelid centroplast is a highly organized organelle in the shape of a tripartite disc sandwiched between two hemispheres, whereas the dimorphid axoplast is a clump of fibrous and granular material with no clear structure. The centrohelid kinetocysts emerge from centrally positioned vesicles of the endoplasmic reticulum, while the dimorphid kinetocysts originate from near the dictyosome.

During the 1990s there were other attempts at drawing an evolutionary proximity between dimorphids and other heliozoa. For example, the desmothoracids share tubular cristae and have two flagella in one life stage, although they lack an axoplast. These attempts were abandoned with the progressive realization that heliozoa were a highly polyphyletic category of unrelated taxa. Instead, taxonomists began searching for similarities with non-heliozoan taxa. Similarities were found between dimorphids and cercozoan amoeboflagellates (e.g., cercomonads), as both groups share at least two heterodynamic flagella and a MTOC that is connected to the basal bodies of the flagella through a rhizoplast, in addition to other similarities in the arrangement of microtubules and the type of open mitosis (orthomitosis). Thus, dimorphids were proposed to have evolved from cercomonad-like ancestors.

Later, the order Dimorphida was replaced with Heliomonadida. The name Dimorpha and its junior synonym Dimorphiella were already preoccupied by several names of animal genera; the new name Heliomorpha was chosen to replace them for most species. In 2009, the genus Acinetactis was added to the group. Three families of heliomonads were recognized, one for each genus: Heliomorphidae, Acinetactidae and Tetradimorphidae. Heliomonads were placed in the class Granofilosea of phylum Cercozoa together with other heliozoa (e.g., desmothoracids) and filose amoeboflagellates.

From 2012 onwards, the three genera and one species became completely split. Due to new ultrastructural data, the genus Heliomorpha was proposed as a distant relative of the new genus Microheliella, instead of a cercozoan. Family Heliomorphidae was the only family in the order Heliomonadida, which was transferred to a new class Endohelea within the phylum Heliozoa, which also contained the order Microhelida, which only contained Microheliella. The family Tetradimorphidae remained within Granofilosea, under a new order Axomonadida, named after the axoplast. Although no ultrastructure or molecular data of Acinetactis is known, it was no longer treated as a heliomonad. Its axopodia, now proposed to be haptopodia instead, were interpreted as homologous to the haptopodia of Aurigamonas. Consequently, the family Acinetactidae was transferred to a new suborder Haptopodina in the order Pansomonadida, which also included the family Aurigamonadidae for only Aurigamonas, within the class Sarcomonadea of phylum Cercozoa. Acinetactis elegans was transferred to be the only species of a new genus Valkomonas, which was placed as incertae sedis in kingdom Chromista. Family Aurigamonadidae was first mentioned informally, it was validated in a paper published later in the same month.

This changed in 2022, when Heliomorpha was transferred back to Cercozoa, on the basis that its kinetocysts, long centrioles, and flat centrosomes support its original classification as a relative of Tetradimorpha. The order Heliomonadida contained both Tetradimorpha and Heliomorpha. In its former place, a new genus Tetrahelia was erected specifically for the species Tetradimorpha pterbica, which was considered a better candidate for a flagellated relative of Microheliella, and sufficiently different from other Tetradimorpha species. Both T. pterbica and Microheliella present globular centrosomes with distinctive shell and core, unlike any other heliozoa, as well as simple flattened extrusomes instead of complex kinetocysts. Consequently, the order Axomonadida was modified to accommodate only this new genus Tetrahelia, in a new family Tetraheliidae. Together with the order Microhelida which contains Microheliella, it was placed in the class Endohelea of Cryptista.

To date, of all the heliomonads only Heliomorpha has been genetically sequenced, and branches with mediocre phylogenetic support within cercozoan novel clades outside of Filosa.
