= Mesofila =

Scientific classification
- Domain: Eukaryota
- Clade: Sar
- Clade: Rhizaria
- Phylum: Cercozoa
- Subphylum: Filosa
- Class: Granofilosea
- Order: Cryptofilida
- Family: Mesofilidae; Cavalier-Smith & Bass in Bass et al. 2009
- Genus: Mesofila; Cavalier-Smith & Bass in Bass et al. 2009
- Species: M. limnetica

Binomial name
- Mesofila limnetica Cavalier-Smith & Bass in Bass et al. 2009

Type strain
- ATCC 50522

Synonyms
- Mesofila: "Dimorpha" pro parte

Genus of marine protists

Mesofila (from Latin mesos 'middle' and fila 'threads') is a genus of freshwater heterotrophic protists of the phylum Cercozoa. It is the only genus in the family Mesofilidae. It is a monotypic genus, with the sole species M. limnetica (from Ancient Greek limno- 'marsh').

== Morphology ==
Mesofila limnetica are small biciliate amoebae with several, extremely long, branching filopodia that, unlike Heliomorphidae, do not radiate in three dimensions but rather remain in contact against the substrate during feeding. The two long cilia and the long filopodia can be present simultaneously or each on their own, depending on the life cycle phase. Mesofila have two phases: amoeboid and flagellate.

- Amoeboid phase. The immotile amoeboid cells are 9 to 14 μm in diameter and have a circular or slightly polygonial shape with a pitted surface. The central nucleus takes up around a quarter of the cell body's diameter and has a conspicuous nucleolus in its center. The filopodia appear from all around the cell, but slightly thicker filopodia usually emerge from the cell poles. The filopodia can grow to be around 10 times the cell's diameter, and they carry evenly and closely-spaced prominent granules.
- Flagellate phase. The motile flagellate cells are ovoid, around 8 μm in length, with two flagella: an anterior flagellum that beats vigorously, often curving round on itself, measuring 0.5 to 1 times the cell's length; and a posterior flagellum that trails, measuring 2 to 2.5 times the cell's length. They glide erratically and swiftly, with the thicker, posterior end of the cell raised off the substrate. They also swim rapidly in a helical motion.

They can also form spherical cysts with a smooth, refractile surface, measuring around 10 μm in diameter.

== Ecology ==
Mesofila limnetica are bacterivorous freshwater amoebae. When the bacterial density is high they can grow very densely, and bacteria accumulate and obscure the cell body. They were isolated from a hot spring with rich organic mud from Palm Canyon, California (United States).
