= Limnofila =

Scientific classification
- Domain: Eukaryota
- Clade: Sar
- Clade: Rhizaria
- Phylum: Cercozoa
- Subphylum: Filosa
- Class: Granofilosea
- Order: Limnofilida; Cavalier-Smith & Bass in Bass et al. 2009
- Family: Limnofilidae; Cavalier-Smith & Bass in Bass et al. 2009
- Genus: Limnofila; Cavalier-Smith & Bass in Bass et al. 2009

Type species
- Limnofila borokensis Cavalier-Smith & Bass in Bass et al. 2009

Species
- L. anglica; L. borokensis; L. longa; L. oxoniensis; L. mylnikovi

Genus of amoebae

Limnofila (from Greek limnos 'marsh' and fila 'threads') is a genus of heterotrophic protists that live in freshwater habitats and feed on bacteria. They are also present in the soil ecosystem, where they play an important role as predators of bacteria. They are classified as a single family Limnofilidae and order Limnofilida.

== Characteristics ==
Limnofilida is phylogenetically defined as the largest clade that includes Limnofila, its only current member, but excludes Massisteria, which belongs to order Leucodictyida. It excludes the phylogenetically distant marine Nanofila which is morphologically similar but with unbranched filopodia. They are small freshwater heterotrophic protists with very slender, branching granular filopodia (or granulopodia), adhered to the substrate during feeding. Their trophic (feeding) phase is a small globular cell. They can present flagella, but are generally not visible under a light microscope.

The cellular ultrastructure of two species of Limnofilida has been studied (L. borokensis and L. mylnikovi). They present flat mitochondrial cristae and complex concentric-structured extrusomes. Their filopodia (filose, or thread-like, pseudopodia) are supported by bundles of 2–6 microtubules. Unlike Heliomonadida, they have no prominent centrosome.

== Ecology ==
Limnofilida are bacterivorous eukaryotes, they feed on bacteria through phagocytosis. As such, they are important soil predators of microbes and belong to a diverse ecological community of soil protists. Although they are described as a freshwater group, they are present in soil microbial communities. They appear as a minority of cercozoan environmental DNA sequences or OTUs in temperate agricultural fields of Germany (1.3%). They also compose a similar minority of the cercozoan OTUs found in two separate forest soils of Norway and the Czech Republic (2%), but are present in a consistent manner across all levels: leaf litter, pure soil, rhizosphere, and in association with plant roots.

== Systematics ==
Type locality of all five Limnofila species

=== Origin and etymology ===
The genus Limnofila was created in 2009 by protistologists Thomas Cavalier-Smith and David Bass, through a research article published in the journal Protist. It was described to encompass several naked amoebae with granular filose pseudopodia (or filopodia) that did not belong in phylogenetic analyses to either Endomyxa or Foraminifera. On the basis of phylogenetic analyses based on 18S rRNA genes, they were assigned to a clade of Cercozoa known as Granofilosea, which was newly described in the same article. In particular, the genus was assigned to a monotypic order Limnofilida and family Limnofilidae. Limnofilida was defined as the most inclusive clade containing Limnofila but excluding Massisteria, which belongs to Leucodictyida. The name Limnofila comes from Greek limnos 'marsh' and fila 'threads', to emphasise both their exclusively freshwater habitat and their exceedingly thin thread-like filopodia.

=== Species ===
There are 5 species of Limnofila, all described in the same 2009 paper where the genus was first described. Two species, L. anglica and L. longa, were isolated from a freshwater lake known as Priest Pot in Cumbria, England. One species, L. oxoniensis, was isolated from garden soil in Oxford. The remaining two species, L. borokensis and L. mylnikovi, were isolated from samples collected in waste treatment plants of Borok, Yaroslavskaya oblast, Russia, and were originally misidentified as Gymnophrys cometa.

1. Limnofila anglica — Cumbria, England.
2. Limnofila borokensis — Borok, Russia.
3. Limnofila longa — Cumbria, England.
4. Limnofila oxoniensis — Oxford, England.
5. Limnofila mylnikovi — Borok, Russia (unsequenced).
