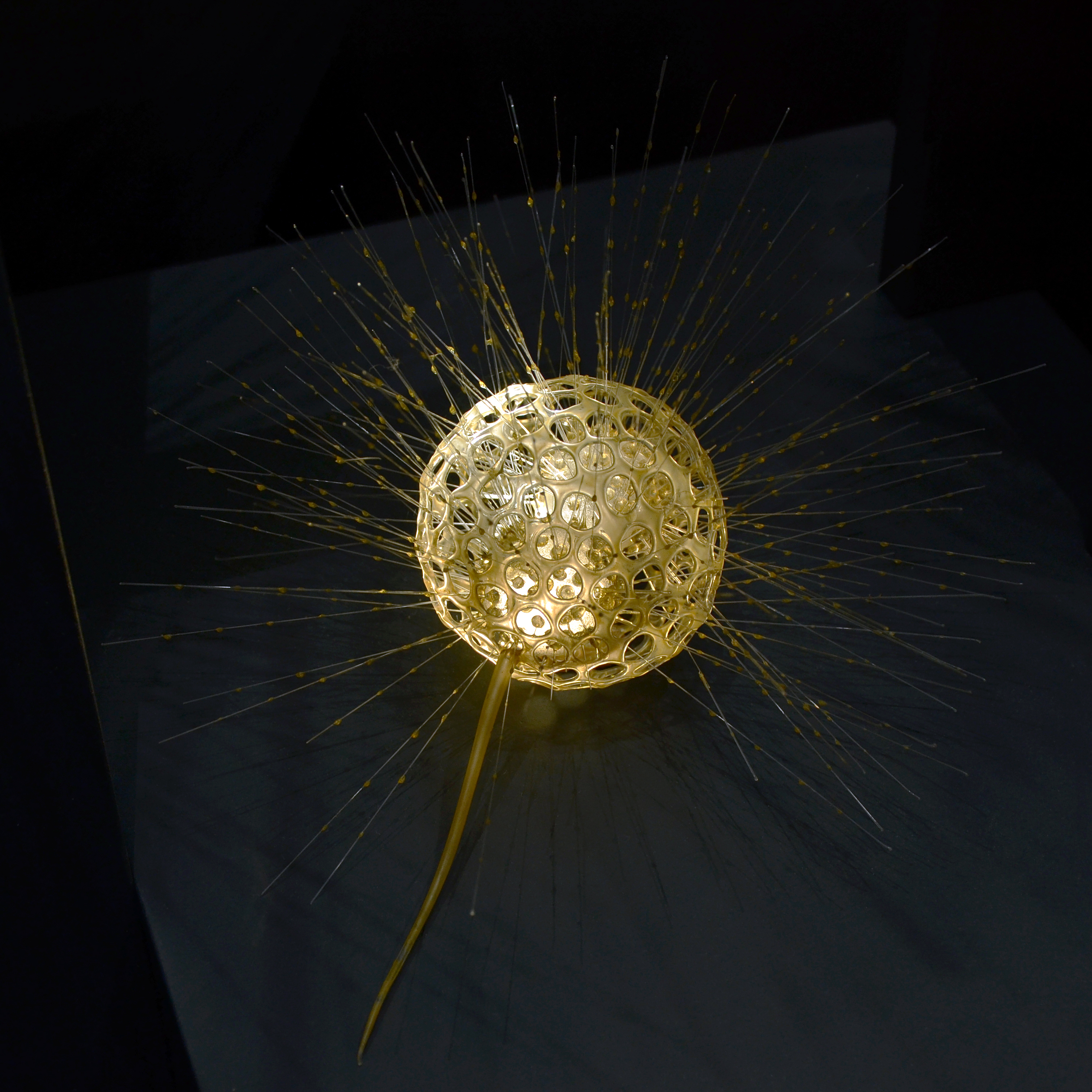
- Blaschka glass model of Clathrulina elegans

Scientific classification
- Domain: Eukaryota
- Clade: Sar
- Clade: Rhizaria
- Phylum: Cercozoa
- Class: Granofilosea
- Order: Desmothoracida
- Family: Clathrulinidae
- Genus: Clathrulina
- Species: C. elegans

Binomial name
- Clathrulina elegans Cienkowsky, 1867

Varieties
- Clathrulina elegan var. planktonicum

= Clathrulina elegans =

Species of single-celled organism

Clathrulina elegans is a species of heliozoan eukaryotes in the order Desmothoracida, which are a group of organisms usually sessile and found in freshwater environments.
