= Actinopoda =

Actinopoda may refer to two different taxonomic groups:

- Actinopoda, Ludwig 1891, a subclass of sea cucumbers
- Actinopoda, Calkins 1909, a major historical grouping of amoebae that included radiolarians and heliozoans
