= Massisteria marina =

Scientific classification
- Domain: Eukaryota
- Clade: Sar
- Clade: Rhizaria
- Phylum: Cercozoa
- Subphylum: Filosa
- Class: Granofilosea
- Order: Leucodictyida
- Family: Massisteriidae
- Genus: Massisteria
- Species: M. marina

Binomial name
- Massisteria marina Larsen & Patterson, 1990

Species of marine protist

Massisteria marina is a species of small marine phagotrophic protists that normally feed on bacteria. Individuals live associated with sediment particles and suspended detritus in litoral or marine waters. It is found at marine sites all around the world. Its predominantly sedentary lifestyle was a discovery that challenged the concept of bacterivorous protists as constantly active hunters, and its permanent association with detritus particles is uncommon among flagellates.

== Morphology ==
Massisteria marina are unicellular amoeboflagellates composed of a flattened irregular star-shaped cell body measuring 3–9 μm in diameter, pressed against the substrate, with several (2 to 10) thin branching filamentous pseudopodia, extrusomes close to the substrate, and two short inactive flagella that measure 4–6 μm. The arrangement of their pseudopodia are reminiscent of freshwater species Gymnophrys cometa, which usually has only two pseudopodial trunks but more can arise.

== Behavior ==
Massisteria marina cells often lie within detritus particles, making them difficult to see unless they are left undisturbed for several minutes. The cells frequently appear in clusters, and the pseudopodia of adjacent cells sometimes join. Electron microscopy reveals that adjacent cells in these clusters often share a common, continuous cytoplasm.

Massisteria marina are usually sedentary and feed through their pseudopodia while their flagella are inactive. However, under adverse conditions, they switch to a swimming non-feeding phase: the pseudopodia are reabsorbed and the flagella become active, with one flagellum directed forward while the other trails behind.

== Distribution ==
Massisteria marina is extremely widespread and abundant. It has been isolated with great frequency from littoral, oceanic and deep waters from tropical and temperate regions. It has been found in Halophila beds in Fiji, Queensland, Panama, Hawaii, Rio de Janeiro, United Kingdom, Ireland, Denmark, and in sedimenting detritus at oceanic sites.
