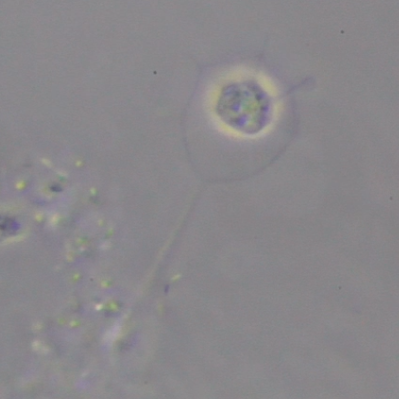
- Extract from a phase-contrast microscopy recording of H. pellucida, with the stalk visible

Scientific classification
- Domain: Eukaryota
- Clade: Sar
- Clade: Rhizaria
- Phylum: Cercozoa
- Class: Granofilosea
- Order: Desmothoracida
- Family: Clathrulinidae
- Genus: Hedriocystis
- Species: H. pellucida

Binomial name
- Hedriocystis pellucida Hertwig & Lesser, 1874

= Hedriocystis pellucida =

Species of amoebae

Hedriocystis pellucida is a species of stalked heliozoan amoebae belonging to the Granofilosea.

== Description ==
Hedriocystis pellucida is a species of heliozoa, amoebae with pseudopodia radiating from the cell in a sun-like fashion. In particular, H. pellucida and other species of Hedriocystis are characterized by cells enclosed in a smooth mucous capsule that is perforated by small pores and stands on a tubular stalk. Capsules of H. pellucida are oval, either transparent or yellow, measuring 16.8–30 μm in diameter, and with the pores located at the tips of conical knobs that are unique to this species. The cells have several contractile vacuoles and produce reproductive flagellates with two flagella.

== Distribution ==
Hedriocystis pellucida is a freshwater species. It has been reported in Australia and in Northern and Western Europe, particularly Germany, Switzerland, Netherlands, France, Sweden, Finland and Bulgaria.

== Taxonomy ==
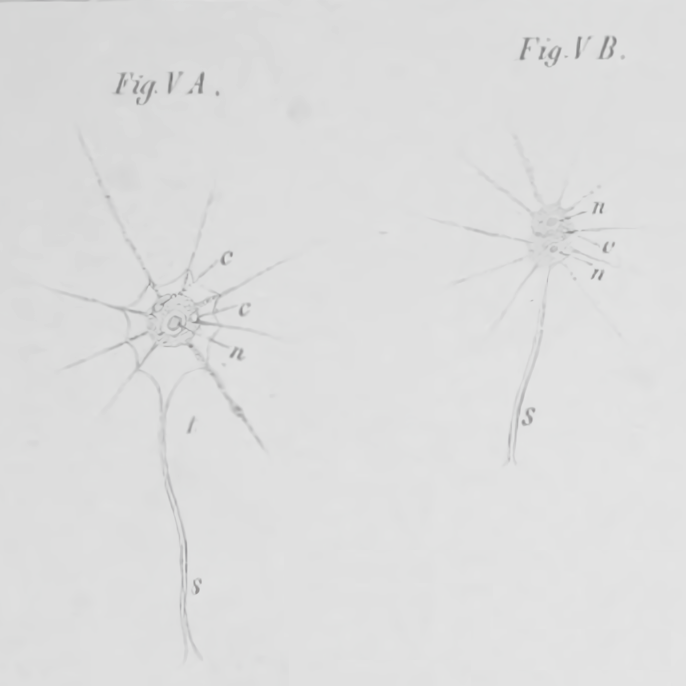
1874 illustration of H. pellucida by Stein.

Hedriocystis pellucida was described in 1874 by Richard Hertwig and Edmund Lesser from amoebae collected in Germany. In phylogenomic analyses, it is the only representative of the class Granofilosea and has been used to infer the evolutionary position of this class in Cercozoa-wide analyses.
