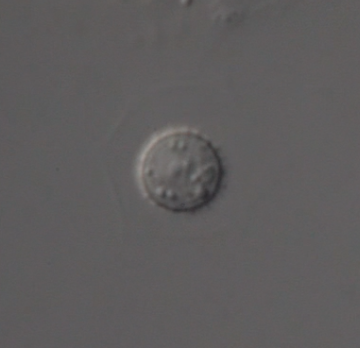
- Hedriocystis pellucida, a desmothoracid

Scientific classification
- Domain: Eukaryota
- Supergroup: Rhizaria
- Phylum: Cercozoa
- Subphylum: Filosa
- Class: Granofilosea; Cavalier-Smith & Bass in Bass et al. 2009

Families
- Gymnosphaeridae?; Leucodictyida; Leucodictyidae; Massisteriidae; Limnofilida; Limnofilidae; "Cryptofilida"; Mesofilidae; Nanofilidae; Desmothoracida; Clathrulinidae; And see text

= Granofilosea =

Class of cercozoans

Granofilosea is a class of cercozoans.

== Characteristics ==
Granofilosean cercozoans typically possess very thin filopodia that are either branched or unbranched; distinct granules (extrusomes) are present on these filopodia at frequent and fairly regular intervals, or there are axopodia — which are radial and sometimes branched — that bear similar granules; microtubules are found within the filopodia; during feeding, they are generally attached to the surface and semi-immobile. In most species, they do not anastomose, but in some — particularly to form a meroplasmodium between separate cells — they can anastomose (in Leucodictyon and Reticulamoeba, and likely in Massisteria as well). Currently characterized species are bacterivorous organisms living in marine and freshwater environments. Many possess two centrioles and exhibit a distinct flagellated stage during feeding (Massisteria marina, likely Limnofila borokensis, Mesofila limnetica, and the desmothoracids), featuring either two ciliary stubs, two short cilia, or even one or two long cilia. Paranuclear Golgi dictyosomes are present, and the ciliary transition zone contains an axosome at the base of the central pair.

=== Leucodictyida ===
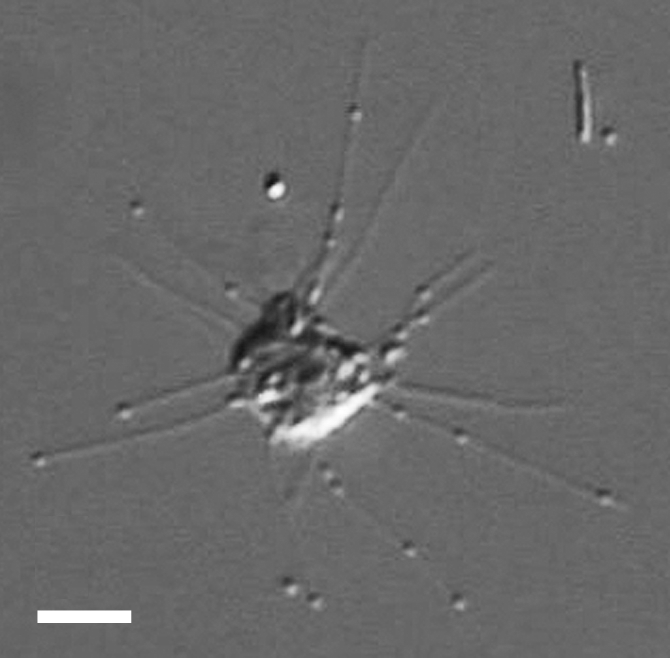
Reticulamoeba gemmipara, a leucodictyid

The filopodia are very thin, branching, and granular. These filopodia can temporarily fuse to form meroplasmodia. Members of this order are biciliate marine protists. The granules are concentric extrusomes. Tubular mitochondrial cristae and large granules in the distal centriolar matrix (a previously unremarked synapomorph) are present, either with paranuclear microbodies (Massisteria) or without (Leucodictyidae: Leucodictyon, Reticulamoeba).

=== Limnofilida ===
Filopodia are branched, regularly granular, and very thin. They appress to the substratum while feeding. They are small freshwater heterotrophic protozoa. The cell is typically spherical and small during the trophic phase. If cilia are present, they are generally not visible under a light microscope. They are bacterivores. This order has been defined as the largest clade that phylogenetically includes Limnofila but excludes Massisteria; it excludes the marine protist Nanofila, which is phylogenetically distant, morphologically similar, but possesses unbranched filopodia.

=== Cryptofilida ===
While feeding, the filopodia apressed to the substratum; these filopodia are granular and may be branching or unbranched. This heterotrophic order does not include cilia. If filopodia branch they are larger than those of the Limnofilida. Etymology: From the Greek "crypto" — hidden, because it had previously been largely overlooked; from the Latin "filum" — thread, because all are filopodial.

=== Desmothoracida ===
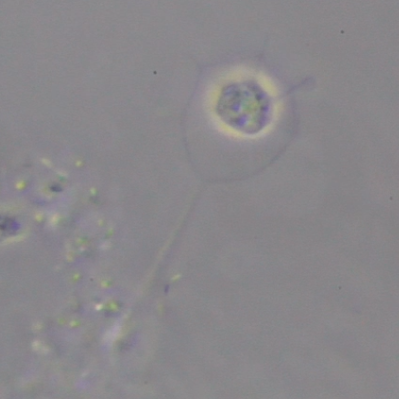
Hedriocystis pellucida, a desmothoracid

The extracellular capsule or lorica is attached to the substratum; or the cells float freely. A mucous sheath is sometimes present around the cell; the branching pseudopodia are capable of anastomosis and contain microtubules. However, they are not organized in a recognizable pattern, and they bear kinetocyst extrusomes. Tubular mitochondrial cristae, biciliate and amoeboid stages, and cysts are present. They may occur in colonies.

== Taxonomy ==
The genus Acinetactis was proposed by Stokes in 1886 and assigned to Infusoria. The genus Tetradimorpha was assigned to the order Phaneraxohelida (class Heliozoa) in 1984, which along with other genera, also contained the genus "Dimorpha" (pro parte =Heliomorpha). The order Leucodictyida was proposed by Cavalier-Smith in 1993 along with its only family Leucodictyidae. It was assigned to the superorder Proteomyxidea (class Heteromitea, phylum Opalozoa) along with the other order Pseudosporida (genus Pseudospora). The family Massisteriidae was also proposed in that same work and assigned to the order Cercomonadida (class Heteromitea, phylum Opalozoa), along with the families Cercomonadidae and Discoceliidae (genus Discocelia).

Cavalier-Smith and Bass proposed the class in Bass et al., 2009. It was assigned to subphylum Filosa in the phylum Cercozoa. It contained five orders: Leucodictyida, Limnofilida (genus Limnofila), Cryptofilida, Desmothoracida and Heliomonadida. Massisteriidae was also assigned to Leucodictyida. Four new genera were also described: Heliomorpha (="Dimorpha" pro parte), Limnofila, Mesofila and Nanofila. Several more groups were suspected to be granofiloseans. The genus Heliomorpha was thought to be a granofilosean and assigned to Heliomonadida along with the genera Acinetactis and Tetradimorpha without sequences at that time, but that was proven wrong, as it was later not recovered in Filosa and assigned to subphylum Endomyxa.

Because that it does not have obvious centrosomes, one species, namely Acinetactis elegans was separated from Acinetactis and assigned to a novel monotypic genus named Valkomonas, which was assigned Diaphoretickes incertae sedis. Acinetactis and Heliomorpha were proposed to be outside of Granofilosea, a new granofilosean order called Axomonadida was used to only include Tetradimorpha. Acinetactis and Tetradimorpha are currently Eukaryota incertae sedis. Some genera were classified as incertae sedis in Granofilosea based on morphology. An incertae sedis species, "Exuviaella" pusilla was also recovered in Granofilosea in 2025.

Current classification:

- Class Granofilosea
  - Order Leucodictyida
    - Family Leucodictyidae
    - Family Massisteriidae
  - Order Limnofilida
    - Family Limnofilidae
  - Order Cryptofilida (paraphyletic/polyphyletic)
    - Family Mesofilidae
    - Family Nanofilidae
  - Order Desmothoracida
    - Family Clathrulinidae
  - Novel Clade Gran-1
  - Novel Clade Gran-2
  - Novel Clade Gran-3
  - Novel Clade Gran-4
  - Novel Clade Gran-5
  - Novel Clade Gran-6
  - Order Incertae sedis
    - Species "Exuviaella" pusilla
    - Genus Apogromia
    - Genus Ditrema (probably)
    - Genus Kibisidytes
    - Genus Microcometes
    - Genus Microgromia
    - Genus Paralieberkuehnia (probably)

Possible Granofilosea:

- Genus Boveemonas
- Genus Clathrella
- Genus Lagenidiopsis
- Genus Heterogromia
- Genus Patevia
- Genus Pseudodimorpha
- Family Gymnosphaeridae

== Phylogeny ==
Two analyses performed in 2009:

- Granofilosea
  - - - - - - Desmothoracida
              - Hedriocystis
              - Clathrulina
            - Novel Clade Gran-4
          - Novel Clade Gran-2
        - Novel Clade Gran-3
      - Leucodictyida
    - - Mesofilidae
        Mesofila
      - - - Nanofilidae
            Nanofila
          - Novel Clade Gran-1
        - Novel Clade Gran-6
  - Limnofilida
    Limnofilidae

- Granofilosea
  - - - - - - - - Desmothoracida
                  - Hedriocystis
                  - Clathrulina
                - Novel Clade Gran-4
              - Novel Clade Gran-2
            - Novel Clade Gran-3
          - - Nanofilidae
              Nanofila
            - Novel Clade Gran-1
        - Novel Clade Gran-6
      - Mesofilidae
        Mesofila
    - - Limnofilida
        Limnofilidae
      - Leucodictyida
  - Novel Clade Gran-5

An analysis in 2011:

- Granofilosea
  - - - - Novel Clade Gran-5
        - - - Desmothoracida
              - Hedriocystis
              - Clathrulina
            - - Novel Clade Gran-4
              - Novel Clade Gran-2
          - Novel Clade Gran-3
      - - - - - Novel Clade Gran-1
              - Nanofilidae
                Nanofila
            - Novel Clade Gran-6
          - Mesofilidae
            Mesofila
    - Leucodictyida
      - Massisteria
      - Minimassisteria
  - Limnofilida
    Limnofilidae
