= Leucodictyon =

Scientific classification
- Domain: Eukaryota
- Clade: Sar
- Clade: Rhizaria
- Phylum: Cercozoa
- Class: Granofilosea
- Order: Leucodictyida
- Family: Leucodictyidae
- Genus: Leucodictyon; Grell, 1991

Genus of single-celled organisms

Leucodictyon is a genus of cercozoans.

It includes the species Leucodictyon marinum.
