= Gymnosphaerid =

Gymnosphaerida

Scientific classification
- Domain: Eukaryota
- Clade: Sar
- Clade: Rhizaria
- Clade: incertae sedis
- Phylum: Cercozoa (?)
- Subphylum: Filosa (?)
- Class: Granofilosea (?)
- Family: Gymnosphaeridae; Poche 1913

Genera
- Actinolophus?; Berkeleyaesol?; Wagnerella?; Actinocoryne; Gymnosphaera; Hedraiophrys

Synonyms
- Axoplasthelida Febvre-Chevalier 1984; Axoplastheliales; Gymnidae; Hedraiophryidae; Wagnerellidae Poche 1913

Group of protists

The gymnosphaerids are a small group of heliozoan protists found in marine environments. They tend to be roughly spherical with radially directed axopods, supported by microtubules in a triangular-hexagonal array arising from an amorphous central granule.

== Genera ==
There are only three genera, each with a single species: Gymnosphaera albida, Hedraiophrys hovassei, and Actinocoryne contractilis.

- Gymnosphaera albida is free-living, usually benthic in shallow water. The cells are round and naked, around 70-100 μm in diameter, and resemble the unrelated Actinosphaerium. The outer cytoplasm, or ectoplasm, forms a distinct layer containing large vesicles.
- Hedraiophrys hovassei is larger and lives attached to algae and other objects. The cells have a conical base, and are covered with long siliceous spicules. The ectoplasm is distinct and frothy, and typically contains bacterial and algal endosymbionts.
- Actinocoryne contractilis is benthic. When feeding, it has a multinucleate base and a contractile stalk up to 150 μm in length, supporting a relatively small uninucleate head, where the central granule and axopods are located. In order to move, it collapses the stalk and head into an amoeboid form which is capable of migration. Reproduction is either by budding off the head or fragmentation of the headless form, producing small free-living cells similar to Gymnosphaera, which then attach themselves and regrow the stalk and base.

== Classification ==
Gymnosphaerids were originally considered centrohelids, which also have microtubules in a triangular-hexagonal array, but are set apart from the others by the structure of the central granule and the mitochondria, which have tubular cristae. The two groups have been treated as separate orders (Axoplasthelida and Centroplasthelida) in a common class, but this has lost support. Instead the gymnosphaerids may be allied with the desmothoracids, and on account of this have been placed in the Cercozoa, but this is somewhat tentative.

- Family Gymnosphaeridae Poche 1913
  - Genus Actinolophus? Schultze 1874
    - Species Actinolophus pedunculatus Schulze 1874
  - Genus Berkeleyaesol? Shishkin, Drachko & Zlatogursky 2021
    - Species Berkeleyaesol magnus (O'Donoghue 1922) Shishkin, Drachko & Zlatogursky 2021
  - Genus Wagnerella? Mereschkowsky 1878
    - Species Wagnerella borealis Mereschkowsky 1878
  - Genus Gymnosphaera Sassaki 1894 non BIume 1828
    - Species Gymnosphaera albida Sassaki 1894
  - Genus Hedraiophrys Febvre-Chevalier & Febvre 2005
    - Species Hedraiophrys hovassei Febvre-Chevalier & Febvre 2005
  - Genus Actinocoryne Febvre-Chevalier 1980
    - Species Actinocoryne contractilis Febvre-Chevalier 1980
