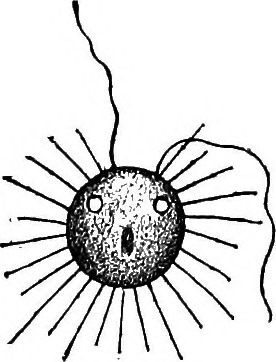
- Acinetactis mirabilis

Scientific classification
- Domain: Eukaryota
- (unranked): incertae sedis
- Family: Acinetactidae; Stokes 1886
- Genus: Acinetactis; Stokes 1886

Type species
- Acinetactis mirabilis Stokes 1886

Species
- Acinetactis mirabilis; Acinetactis arnaudoffii

= Acinetactis =

Genus of protists

Acinetactis is a genus of protist first described in 1886 by A.C. Stokes, who also described the type species A. mirabilis. In 1928, Valkanov reported the discovery of a second species, A. arnaudovii. The most recently recorded specimen of A. mirabilis was reported in 1940, no Acinetactis specimens have been reported since.

The validity and classification of this genus is contested. In 1914, Adolf Pascher cast doubt on Acinetactis, suggesting that it was a junior synonym of Dimorpha mutans. Bass et al. suggested in 2009 that the genus was a cercozoan in the class Granofilosea. It was also suggested that it could be a pansomonad.
