= Tetradimorpha pterbica =

Scientific classification
- Domain: Eukaryota
- (unranked): incertae sedis
- Order: Heliomonadida
- Family: Tetradimorphidae
- Genus: Tetradimorpha
- Species: T. pterbica

Binomial name
- Tetradimorpha pterbica Mikrjukov & Patterson in Mikrjukov 2000

Synonyms
- Tetrahelia pterbica (Mikrjukov & Patterson in Mikrjukov 2000) Cavalier-Smith 2022

Species of protist

Tetradimorpha pterbica (from Latin tetra- 'four' and helio- 'sun') is a species of four-ciliated protists.

== Description ==
Tetradimorpha pterbica are unicellular ciliates with four standard-length centrioles that are shorter than in Heliomorpha and other Tetradimorpha, and axopodia generated by a globular centrosome with a distinct granular shell and a microfibrillar core. The centrioles are arranged in two pairs: each pair has two parallel centrioles, and the pairs are positioned at 30° of rotation between each other. They are linked at the base by an amorphous material that connects them to the centrosome. There are lateral dictyosomes on either side of the cell nucleus. The axopodia have several irregularly arranged microtubules and irregularly flattened extrusomes, instead of the kinetocysts seen in Heliomorpha and Tetradimorpha radiata. The cell size is larger than 60 μm, and the centrosome itself measures between 18 and 20 μm. There is a thick pseudopellicle layer beneath the cell membrane.

The life cycle of Tetradimorpha pterbica contains a lazily swimming, purely flagellate stage with fully retracted axopodia.

== Classification ==
Cavalier-Smith proposed to assign this species to a new monotypic cryptist genus, Tetrahelia. He uses Endohelea in Cryptista for Microheliella and Tetrahelia, but this is incompatible with the current consensual classification, as Microheliella was described as a non-cryptist but Cavalier-Smith later assigned it to Cryptista, but this did not meet consensus, Pancryptista contains Cryptista and Microheliella. The species is within Tetradimorpha and the genus is incertae sedis within eukaryotes.
