= Minimassisteria =

Scientific classification
- Domain: Eukaryota
- Clade: Sar
- Clade: Rhizaria
- Phylum: Cercozoa
- Subphylum: Filosa
- Class: Granofilosea
- Order: Leucodictyida
- Family: Massisteriidae
- Genus: Minimassisteria; Arndt and Cavalier-Smith in Howe et al., 2011
- Species: M. diva

Binomial name
- Minimassisteria diva Arndt and Cavalier-Smith in Howe et al., 2011

Genus of marine protists

Minimassisteria is a marine bacterivorous genus of protists with only one species, Minimassisteria diva, that presents three different lifestyle forms. It has a widespread geographic distribution. It is an amoeboflagellate most closely related to Massisteria, and together comprise the family Massisteriidae.

== Morphology and behavior ==
Minimassisteria are trimorphic (i.e. with three forms) filose amoeboflagellates with two flagella. Their life cycle has a trophic phase that feeds by non-anastomosing filose pseudopodia (i.e. filopodia) that bear evident granules along their length. There is a distinct swimming form and, unlike its closest relative Massisteria, a crawling form with a thicker non-granular anterior filopodia used for traction.

- Feeding form. These cells, known as trophonts, have a flattened cell body attached to the substrate, measuring 2.3 to 5.0 μm in diameter. Between 1 and 15 delicately thin filopodia radiate from the cell body up to 52 μm in length, with up to 11 granules each, probably extrusomes. The cells are found aggregated over the substrate, where attached cells multiply by fission.
- Swimming form. The attached cells can change into sausage-shaped swimming cells, more slender than the trophonts, measuring 2 to 4.5 μm in size. They have one anterior and one trailing flagellum, each around 4 μm long, and can move relatively fast. Within a few minutes, swimming stages may attach to the substrate to reform as trophonts; if so, flagella are partly reabsorbed and therefore appear shorter than in swimming stages (less than 2 μm), are immotile and hard to see. This phase is still phagotrophic and capable of capturing bacteria.
- Crawling form. There is one major pseudopodium, thicker and shorter than in trophonts, with invisible granules. There is also a posterior flagellum that trails behind. Typically there are other thick pseudopods on either side of the cell.

== Etymology ==
The genus name references the small size, as well as its similarity to Massisteria. The species epithet references the deep-sea expedition DIVA, during which the type strain of M. diva was collected, at a depth of 5036 meters in the Northern Cape abyssal plain.
