= Nanofila =

Scientific classification
- Domain: Eukaryota
- Clade: Sar
- Clade: Rhizaria
- Phylum: Cercozoa
- Subphylum: Filosa
- Class: Granofilosea
- Order: Cryptofilida
- Family: Nanofilidae; Cavalier-Smith & Bass in Bass et al. 2009
- Genus: Nanofila; Cavalier-Smith & Bass in Bass et al. 2009
- Species: N. marina

Binomial name
- Nanofila marina Cavalier-Smith & Bass in Bass et al. 2009

Type strain
- USNM51490

Genus of marine protists

Nanofila (from Latin nanos 'tiny' and fila 'threads') is a genus of marine heterotrophic protists of the phylum Cercozoa. It is the only genus in the family Nanofilidae. It is a monotypic genus, with the sole species N. marina.

== Morphology ==
Nanofila are small amoebae with unbranched, granular filopodia. They lack cilia, have a spherical shape of around 3 μm in diameter, and extend about six extremely thin filopodia that lie flat against the substrate.
