= Massisteriidae =

Scientific classification
- Domain: Eukaryota
- Clade: Sar
- Clade: Rhizaria
- Phylum: Cercozoa
- Subphylum: Filosa
- Class: Granofilosea
- Order: Leucodictyida
- Family: Massisteriidae; Cavalier-Smith 1993

Type genus
- Massisteria Larsen & Patterson 1990

Genera
- Massisteria; Minimassisteria

Diversity
- 3 species

Synonyms
- "Massisteridae" Cavalier-Smith 1993

Family of protists

Massisteriidae is a family of granofilosean protists within the phylum Cercozoa.

== Taxonomy ==
Massisteriidae contains two genera:

- Massisteria Larsen & Patterson 1990
  - Massisteria marina Larsen & Patterson 1990
  - Massisteria voersi Mylnikov & Wylezich 2015
- Minimassisteria Arndt & Cavalier-Smith 2011
  - Minimassisteria diva Arndt & Cavalier-Smith 2011
