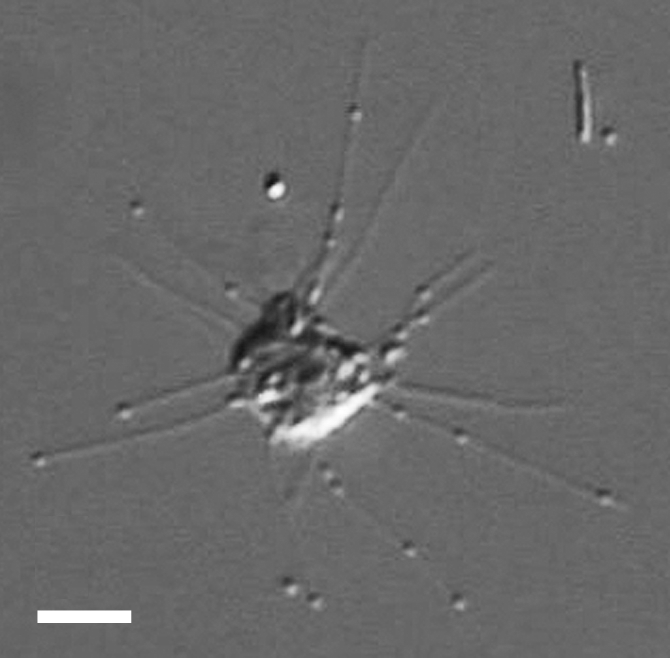
- Amoeboid stage. Scale bar: 10 µm.
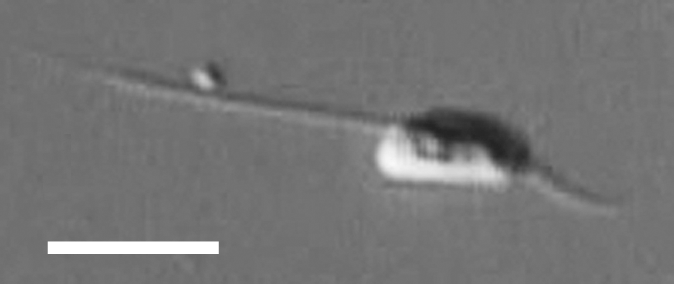
- Flagellate stage. Scale bar: 10 µm.

Scientific classification
- Domain: Eukaryota
- Clade: Sar
- Clade: Rhizaria
- Phylum: Cercozoa
- Subphylum: Filosa
- Class: Granofilosea
- (unranked): incertae sedis
- Genus: Reticulamoeba; Grell, 1994

Species
- Reticulamoeba gemmipara Grell 1994; Reticulamoeba minor Grell 1995

= Reticulamoeba =

Genus of single-celled organisms

Reticulamoeba is a genus of Rhizaria. It is a relatively large unicellular protist and is commonly known for its thin reticulopodia radiating outwards from the cell (Bass et al., 2012). Reticulamoeba are strictly benthic protists that use their reticulopodia for feeding. They have a close association with benthic diatoms as their main source of food (Bass et al., 2012). There are only two Reticulamoeba species described to date and the protozoologist Karl Grell discovered both of them (Bass et al., 2012).

== History ==
The genus Reticulamoeba was described in 1994 by the protozoologist Karl Grell based on the species R. gemmipara and not until a year later a second species R. minor was discovered (Bass et al., 2012). The two species form a clade within the cercozoan class Granofilosea (Bass et al., 2012). Within this clade, Reticulamoeba present phylogenetic similarities with the genus Mesofila (Bass et al., 2012).

== Habitat and ecology ==
Reticulamoeba is commonly isolated from benthic marine littoral zones as well as in freshwater biofilm (Bass et al., 2012).

== Anatomy ==
The genus is an amoeboflagellate with a stationary flattened amoeboid stage (Bass et al., 2012). The body of Reticulamoeba is roundish with an irregular outline and about 3-8μm across (Bass et al., 2012). The cell consists of a nucleus, digestive vacuoles and thin reticulopodia (Grell, 1995). The long thin reticulopodia stretch outwards from the cell to form networks across a substrate (Bass et al., 2012). The network created can be larger in diameter than the cell itself (Bass et al., 2012). The reticulopodia present bidirectionally motile granules and move slowly enabling them to change the size and the shape of the network formed (Bass et al., 2012). The first described species of Reticulamoeba was found associated with diatoms on which they feed (Bass et al., 2012). The reticulopodia are what interacts with the diatoms during feeding by penetrating the diatom frustules (Bass et al., 2012). Unlike other organisms, Reticulamoeba form feeding communities to enhance their feeding method; Reticulamoeba cells work together fusing their reticulopodia with each other to create these 'feeding communities' (Bass et al., 2012). The genus also shows a biflagellate stage similar to the amoeboid stage, round to irregular in shape (Bass et al., 2012). They can be described as zoospores and have a short anterior and long posterior flagella that aid the Reticulamoeba in swimming (Bass et al., 2012). The flagella are used for both swimming and gliding and once they become stationary they resorb the flagella and eject their reticulopodia to return to the amoeboid stage (Bass et al., 2012). Species of Reticulamoeba differ in their method of cell division. The cells undergo cell division in one of two ways, either by binary fission or by unequal binary fission (Bass et al., 2012).
