= Pansomonadida =

Scientific classification
- Domain: Eukaryota
- Supergroup: Rhizaria
- Phylum: Cercozoa
- Subphylum: Filosa
- Infraphylum: Monadofilosa
- Order: Pansomonadida; Vickerman in Vickerman et al. 2005

Families
- Agitatidae; Aurigamonadidae

Synonyms
- Pansomonadina Vickerman in Vickerman et al. 2005 stat. n. Cavalier-Smith in Cavalier-Smith, Chao & Lewis 2018

Group of gliding protists

The pansomonads, order Pansomonadida, are a group of heterotrophic protists that belong to the phylum Cercozoa. Some of them are helioflagellates, with characteristics of heliozoans and amoebo-flagellates.

== Morphology and ecology ==
They are gliding phagotrophs that inhabit the soil and, unlike Allapsidae and Dujardinidae, typically form rounded lamellar pseudopodia (= lamellipodia) that spread over surfaces. They have two dense rhizoplasts linked with each mature centriole. Their centrioles are orthogona or parallel to each other. The transition zone of their cilia has a dense distal plate. They are either bacterivorous or algivorous—bacterivorous forms may have haptopodia.

== Classification ==
Phylogenetic analyses consistently showed that the two orders were sister groups, and it was proposed that pansomonads had evolved from glissomonads. At the same time, Viridiraptoridae was recovered as more closely related to the known pansomonads at the time than to glissomonads, which prompted the inclusion of viridiraptorids within pansomonads. Adl et al., 2019 excludes viridiraptorids and pansomonads from glissomonads. The current taxonomy of the pansomonads is:

- Family Agitatidae Cavalier-Smith & Bass in Bass et al. 2009
  - Agitata Cavalier-Smith & Bass in Bass et al. 2009
- Family Aurigamonadidae Cavalier-Smith in Cavalier-Smith & Oates 2012
  - Aurigamonas Vickerman in Vickerman et al. 2005
