= Bernard Richards =

British academic (1931–2024)

Bernard Richards (16 October 1931 – 7 April 2024) was a British computer scientist and an Emeritus Professor of Medical Informatics at the University of Manchester, England.

Richards studied mathematics and physics for his bachelor's degree. For his master's degree, he worked under the supervision of Alan Turing (1912–1954) at Manchester as one of Turing's last students, helping to validate Turing’s theory of morphogenesis. Morphogenesis had been actively discussed in Manchester, in an empirical way, since 1919, before the availability of electronic computing.

Reflecting on Turing's death at the age of 80 during Turing's centenary year in 2012, Richards commented: "The day he died felt like driving through a tunnel and the lights being switched off".

After Turing died, Richards changed his research area and worked for his doctorate, studying an aspect of optics, resulting in a Royal Society paper with his supervisor, Professor Emil Wolf. This provided a detailed description of the diffraction of light through a convex lens. After this, Richards moved into the area of medicine, producing an important paper on hormone peaks in the menstrual cycle. Later he worked on expert systems aimed at use in open heart surgery and also intensive care units.

Richards became Professor of Medical Informatics at Manchester University and latterly Emeritus Professor in the School of Computer Science.

Richards served as a Chairman of the BCS Health Informatics Committee and in 1998 was made BCS Fellow of the Year for Services to Medical Informatics. He was the first President of the Institute for Health Record and Information Management (IHRIM), a member of the International Federation of Records Officers (IFRO). In Europe, he is an Honorary Member of the Ukrainian Association for Computer Medicine of Ukraine, the Romanian Academy of Medical Science, the John von Neumann Computer Society of Hungary, the Czech Medical Informatics Society, and the Polish Medical Informatics Society. Richards was presented with an award by Queen Elizabeth II for contributing a morphogenesis memento to a time capsule during 2012, Alan Turing's centenary year.

Richards died on 7 April 2024, at the age of 92.
