= Aurigamonas =

Scientific classification
- Domain: Eukaryota
- Clade: Sar
- Clade: Rhizaria
- Phylum: Cercozoa
- Subphylum: Filosa
- Order: Pansomonadida
- Family: Aurigamonadidae; Cavalier-Smith in Cavalier-Smith & Oates 2012
- Genus: Aurigamonas; Vickerman in Vickerman et al. 2005
- Species: A. solis

Binomial name
- Aurigamonas solis Vickerman in Vickerman et al. 2005

Genus of protists

Aurigamonas is a genus of predatory protists of an unusual cell structure, with two flagella and numerous haptopodia. It is a monotypic genus containing the single species Aurigamonas solis. It is the only genus of the family Aurigamonadidae.

== Etymology ==
The genus name comes from the Latin Auriga, meaning charioteer, as a reference to the rein-like motion of the posterior flagellum. The species epithet comes from the Latin solis, meaning sun, due to the Greek legend of the sun being drawn across the heavens by a charioteer.

== Morphology and movement ==
Aurigamonas are unicellular zooflagellates with a spherical to ovoid shape (3–18 μm in diameter). Their most striking characteristic are the numerous long stiff haptopodia (around 30 to 50, each around 6 μm in length) radiating from the cell body, supported by microfilaments and tipped by a dense haptosome. They bear two cilia: the posterior, long and used for propulsion (9–52 μm), that beats in sinuous waves from the base; and the anterior, short and not motile (4–8 μm). They have two contractile vacuoles next to the flagellar bases and the nucleus. They glide only on the distal segment of their posterior cilium.

== Ecology and behavior ==
Aurigamonas are soil-dwelling protists that prey on eukaryotic protozoa of very different sizes, and possibly bacteria. Their prey is captured by adhesion to haptopodia. At least three modes of ingestion have been distinguished:

1. Phagocytosis of entire protists (such as Bodo saltans).
2. Myzocytosis of parts of the cytoplasm of large prey (such as Euglena gracilis).
3. Trawling of bacteria attached to the substrate by extending a large lamellipodium.
