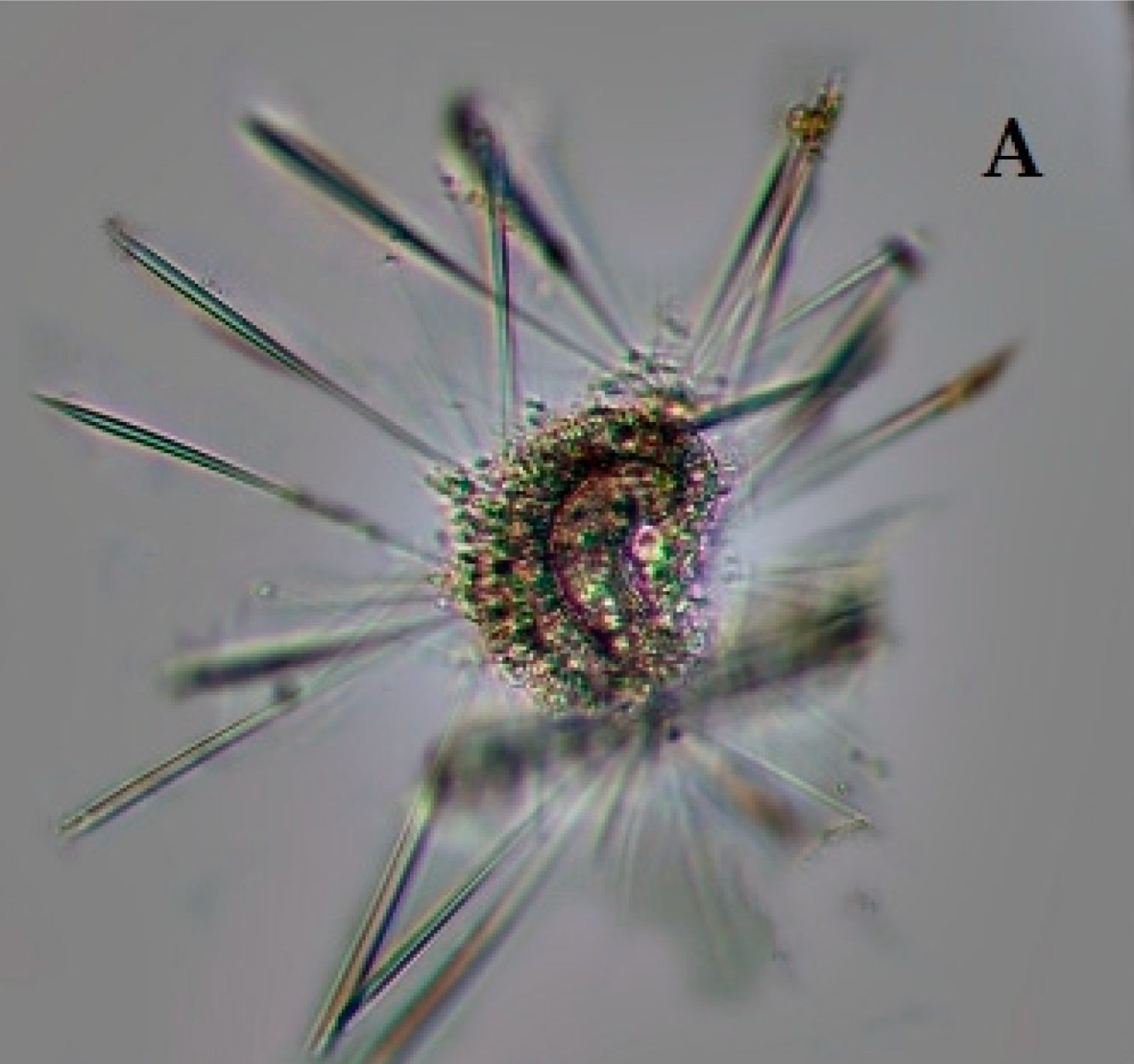
- S. zanclea from the Indian Ocean

Scientific classification
- Domain: Eukaryota
- Clade: Sar
- Clade: Rhizaria
- Phylum: Radiolaria
- Class: Sticholonchea; Poche, 1913 stat. n. Petruschevskaya, 1977
- Order: Taxopodida; Fol, 1883
- Family: Sticholonchidae; Hertwig, 1877
- Genus: Sticholonche; Hertwig, 1877
- Species: S. zanclea

Binomial name
- Sticholonche zanclea Hertwig, 1877

= Sticholonche =

Genus of single-celled organisms

Sticholonche is a genus of radiolarians with a single species, Sticholonche zanclea, found in open oceans at depths of 99–510 metres. It is generally considered a heliozoan, placed in its own order, called the Taxopodida. However it has also been classified as an unusual radiolarian, and this has gained support from genetic studies, which place it near the Acantharea.

Sticholonche are usually around 200 μm, though this varies considerably, and have a bilaterally symmetric shape, somewhat flattened and widened at the front. The axopods are arranged into distinct rows, six of which lie in a dorsal groove and are rigid, and the rest of which are mobile. These are used primarily for buoyancy, rather than feeding. They also have fourteen groups of prominent spines, and many smaller spicules, although there is no central capsule as in true radiolarians.
