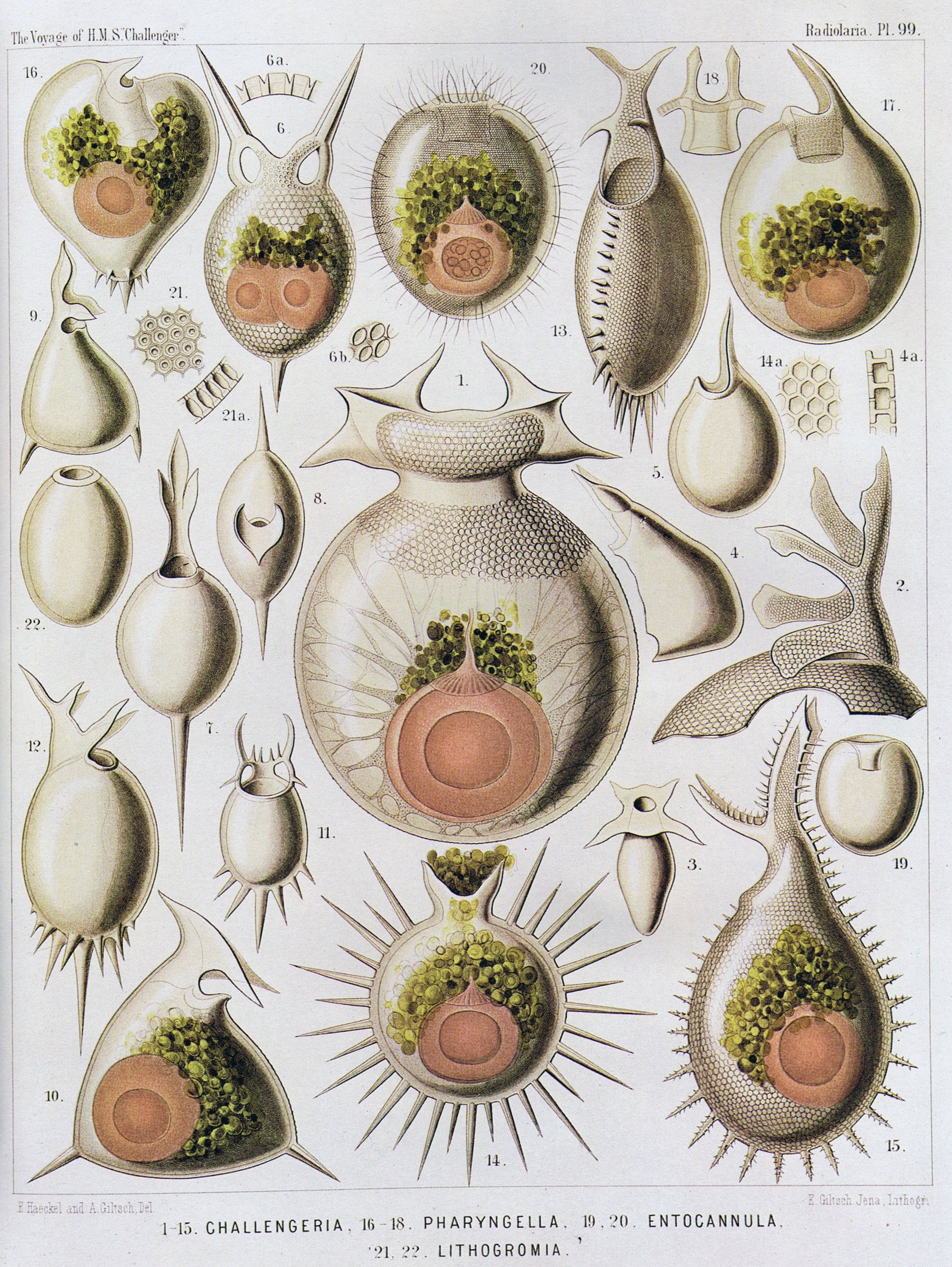
- Radiolaria illustration from the Challenger expedition 1873–76

Scientific classification
- Domain: Eukaryota
- Clade: Sar
- Clade: Rhizaria
- Clade: Retaria
- Phylum: Radiolaria; Müller 1858 sensu Adl et al. 2005

Classes
- Polycystinea; Acantharia; Sticholonchea (Sticholonche); Excluded: Phaeodarea (now in Cercozoa)

Synonyms
- Radiozoa Cavalier-Smith 1987

= Radiolaria =

Radiolaria Temporal range: Cambrian – Recent

Phylum of single-celled organisms

The Radiolaria, also called Radiozoa and informally called radiolarians, are unicellular eukaryotes of diameter 0.1–0.2 mm that produce intricate mineral skeletons, typically with a central capsule dividing the cell into the inner and outer portions of endoplasm and ectoplasm. The elaborate mineral skeleton is usually made of silica. They are found as zooplankton throughout the global ocean. As zooplankton, radiolarians are primarily heterotrophic, but many have photosynthetic endosymbionts and are, therefore, considered mixotrophs. The skeletal remains of some types of radiolarians make up a large part of the cover of the ocean floor as siliceous ooze. Due to their rapid change as species and intricate skeletons, radiolarians represent an important diagnostic fossil found from the Cambrian onwards.

== Description ==
Radiolarians have many needle-like pseudopods supported by bundles of microtubules, which aid in the radiolarian's buoyancy. The cell nucleus and most other organelles are in the endoplasm, while the ectoplasm is filled with frothy vacuoles and lipid droplets, keeping them buoyant. The radiolarian can often contain symbiotic algae, especially zooxanthellae, which provide most of the cell's energy. Some of this organization is found among the heliozoa, but those lack central capsules and only produce simple scales and spines.

Some radiolarians are known for their resemblance to regular polyhedra, such as the icosahedron-shaped Circogonia icosahedra pictured below.

== Taxonomy ==
The radiolarians belong to the supergroup Rhizaria together with (amoeboid or flagellate) Cercozoa and (shelled amoeboid) Foraminifera. Traditionally the radiolarians have been divided into four groups—Acantharia, Nassellaria, Spumellaria and Phaeodarea. Phaeodaria is however now considered to be cercozoans. Nassellaria and Spumellaria both produce siliceous skeletons and were therefore grouped together in the group Polycystinea. Despite some initial suggestions to the contrary, this is also supported by molecular phylogenies. The Acantharia produce skeletons of strontium sulfate and is closely related to a peculiar genus, Sticholonche (Taxopodida), which lacks an internal skeleton and was for long time considered a heliozoan. The Radiolaria can therefore be divided into two major lineages: Polycystinea and Spasmaria (Acantharia + Taxopodida). It has also been suggested that they can be divided into Radiozoa (Acantharia + Polycystinea) and Taxopodida, now excluded from Radiozoa.

There are several higher-order groups that have been detected in molecular analyses of environmental data. Particularly, groups related to Acantharia and Spumellaria. These groups are so far completely unknown in terms of morphology and physiology and the radiolarian diversity is therefore likely to be much higher than what is currently known.

The relationship between the Foraminifera and Radiolaria were also debated. Molecular trees support their close relationship—a grouping termed Retaria. Nowadays, that grouping is seen as robustly supported.

== Biogeography ==
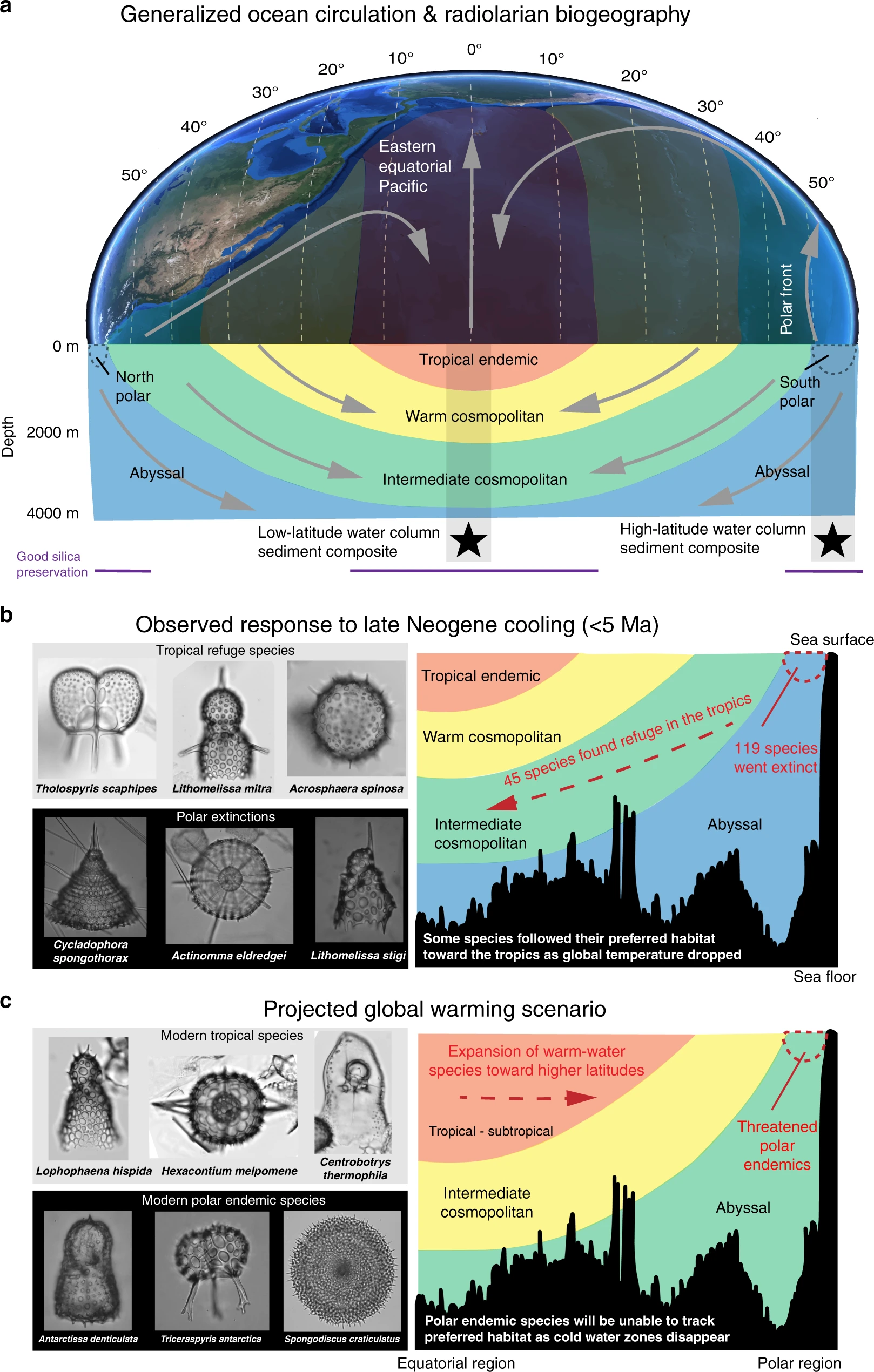
Radiolarian biogeography with observed and predicted responses to temperature change The color polygons in all three panels represent generalized radiolarian biogeographic provinces, as well as their relative water mass temperatures (cooler colors indicate cooler temperatures, and vice versa). Globe image adapted from NASA Blue Marble: Next Generation imagery. Ocean floor bathymetry from Google Earth seafloor elevation profile (5°N–74°S, at 120°W).

In the diagram on the right, a Illustrates generalized radiolarian provinces and their relationship to water mass temperature (warm versus cool color shading) and circulation (gray arrows). Due to high-latitude water mass submergence under warm, stratified waters in lower latitudes, radiolarian species occupy habitats at multiple latitudes, and depths throughout the world oceans. Thus, marine sediments from the tropics reflect a composite of several vertically stacked faunal assemblages, some of which are contiguous with higher latitude surface assemblages. Sediments beneath polar waters include cosmopolitan deep-water radiolarians, as well as high-latitude endemic surface water species. Stars in (a) indicate the latitudes sampled, and the gray bars highlight the radiolarian assemblages included in each sedimentary composite. The horizontal purple bars indicate latitudes known for good radiolarian (silica) preservation, based on surface sediment composition.

Data show that some species were extirpated from high latitudes but persisted in the tropics during the late Neogene, either by migration or range restriction (b). With predicted global warming, modern Southern Ocean species will not be able to use migration or range contraction to escape environmental stressors, because their preferred cold-water habitats are disappearing from the globe (c). However, tropical endemic species may expand their ranges toward midlatitudes. The color polygons in all three panels represent generalized radiolarian biogeographic provinces, as well as their relative water mass temperatures (cooler colors indicate cooler temperatures, and vice versa).

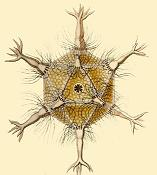
Circogonia icosahedra, radiolarian species shaped like a regular icosahedron

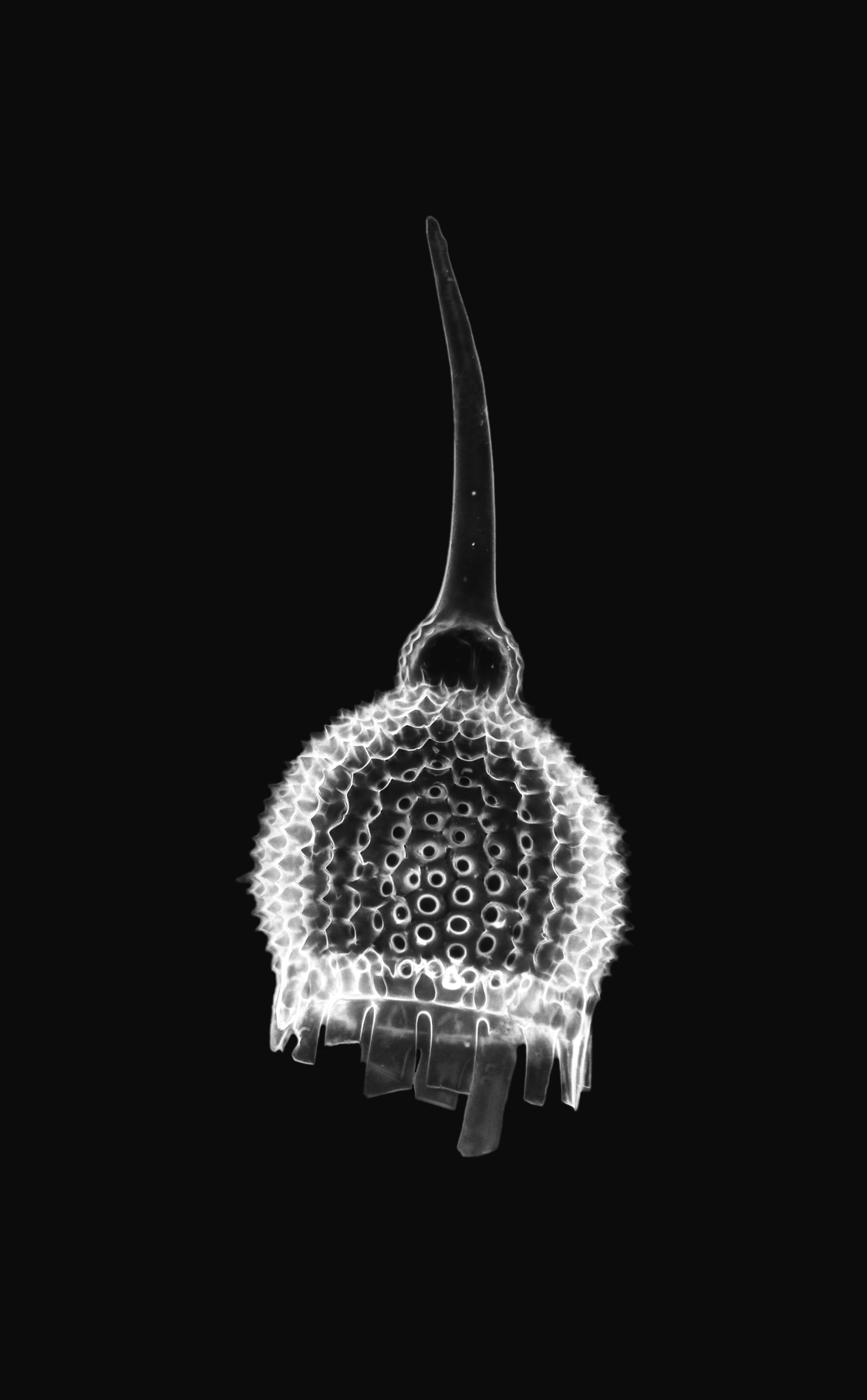
Anthocyrtium hispidum Haeckel

== Radiolarian shells ==
Radiolarian shapes
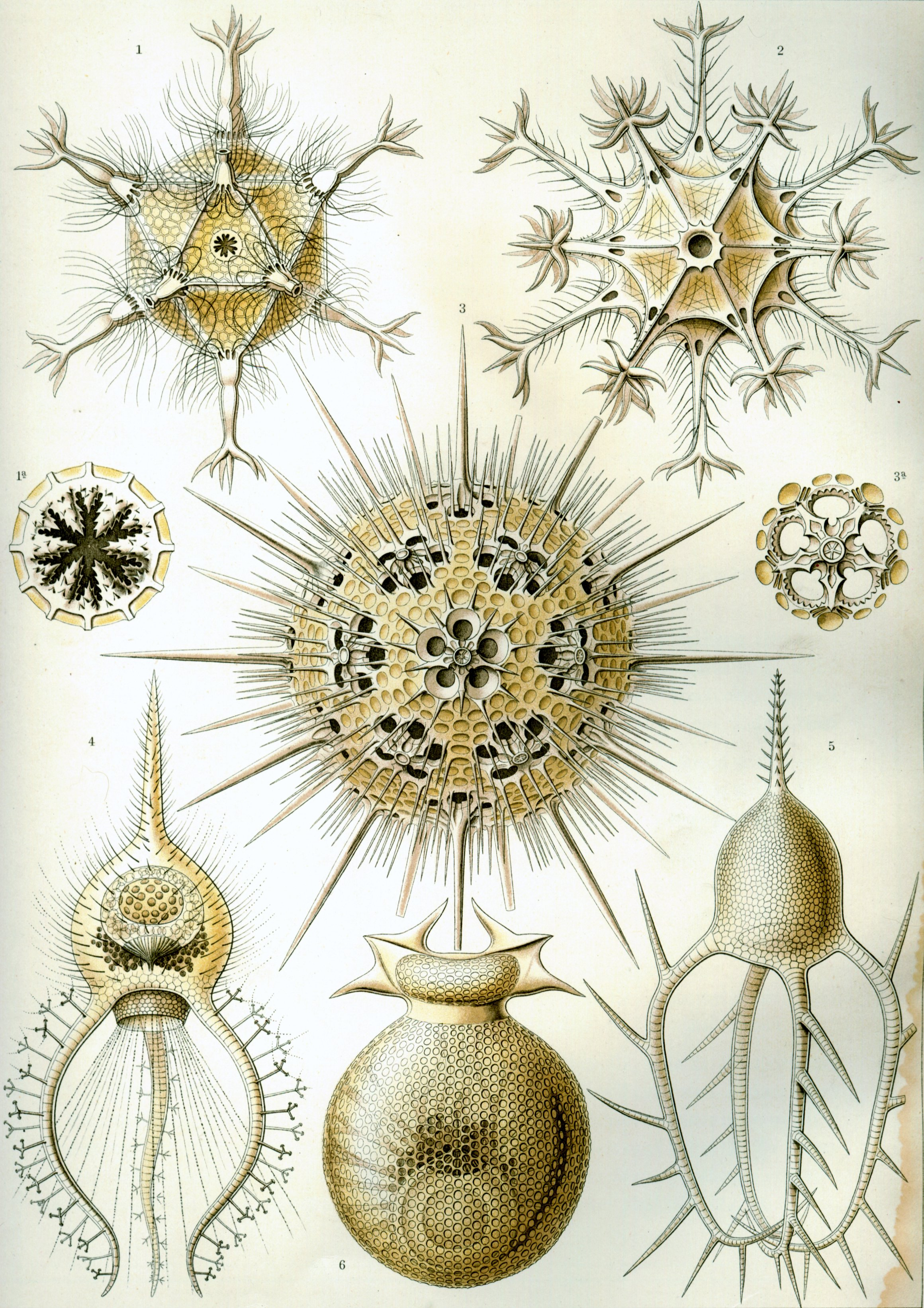
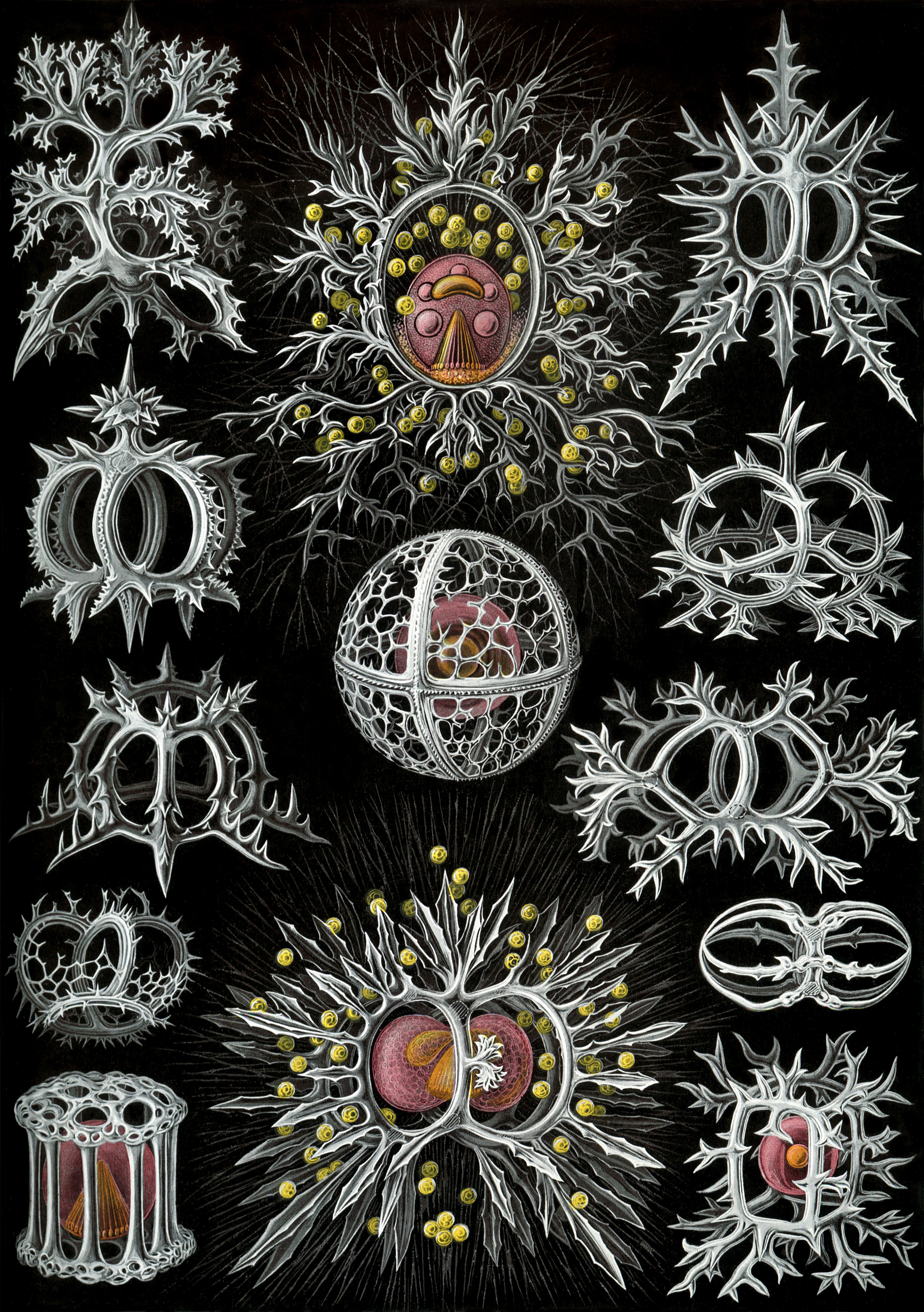
Drawings by Haeckel 1904

Radiolarians are unicellular predatory protists encased in elaborate globular shells (or "capsules"), usually made of silica and pierced with holes. Their name comes from the Latin for "radius". They catch prey by extending parts of their body through the holes. As with the silica frustules of diatoms, radiolarian shells can sink to the ocean floor when radiolarians die and become preserved as part of the ocean sediment. These remains, as microfossils, provide valuable information about past oceanic conditions.

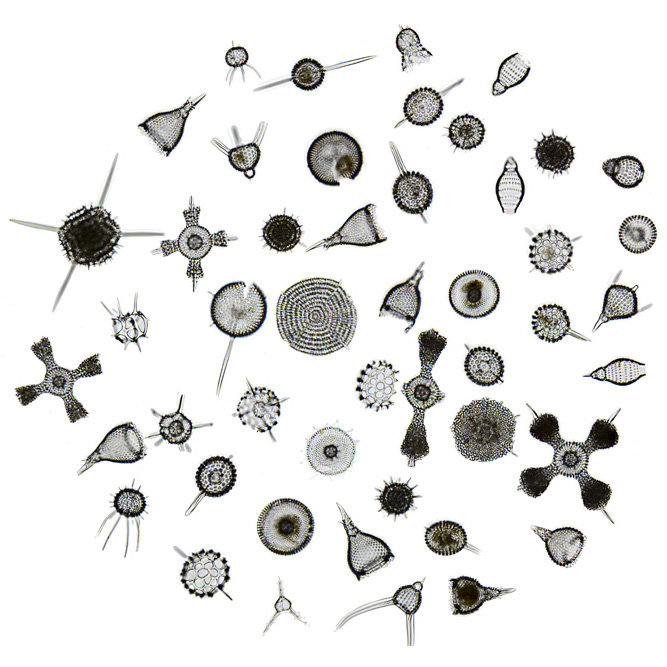
Like diatoms, radiolarians come in many shapes

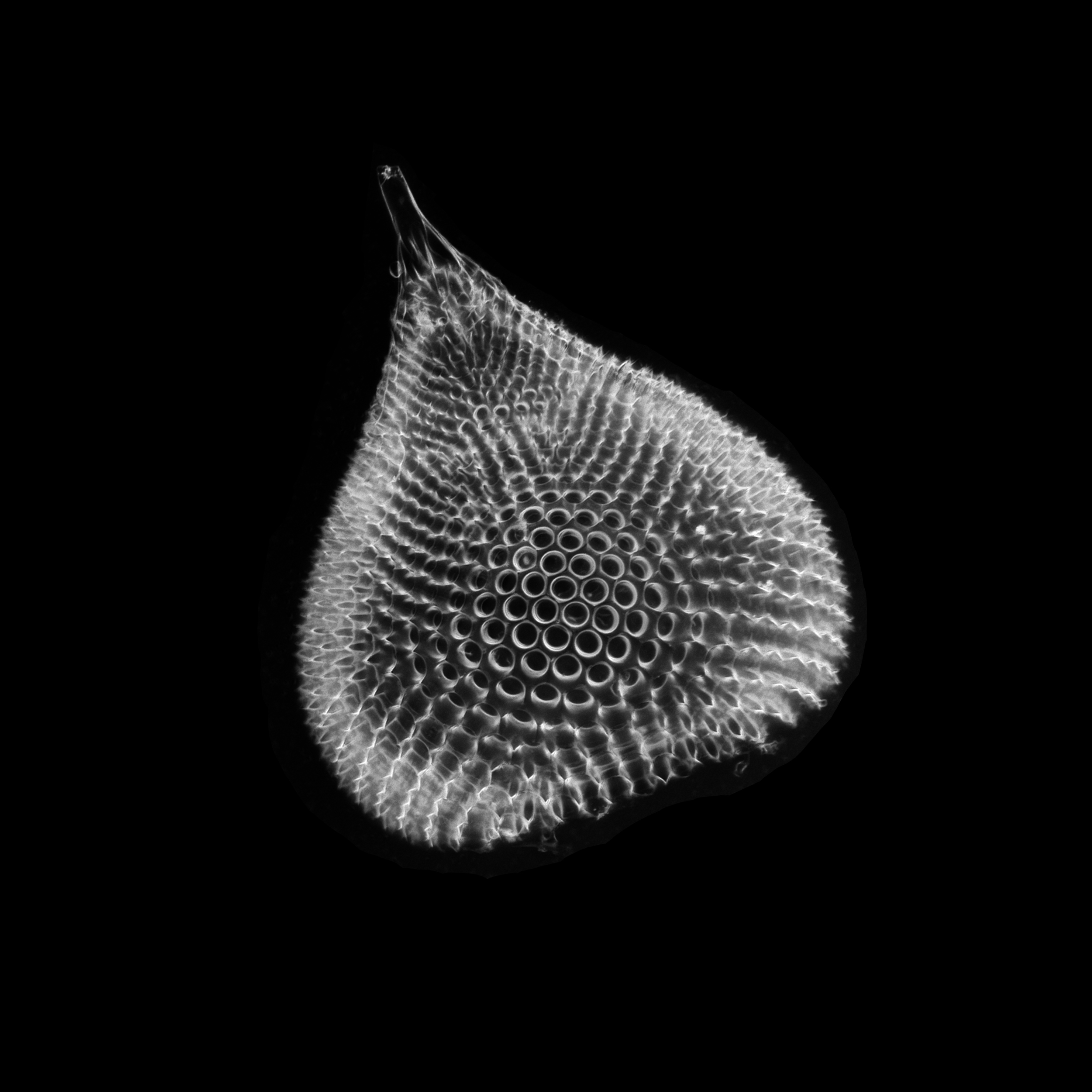
Also like diatoms, radiolarian shells are usually made of silicate

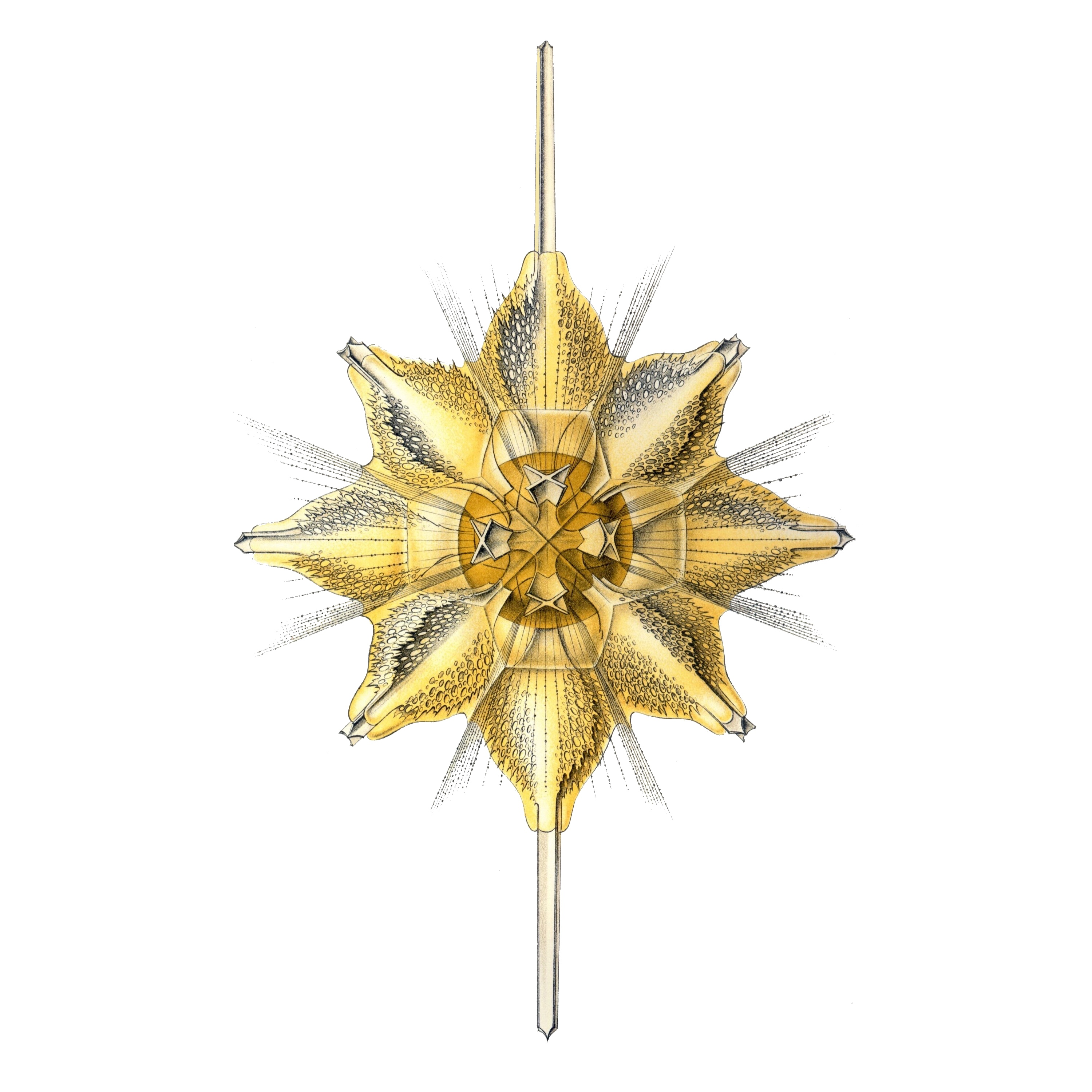
acantharian radiolarians have shells made from strontium sulfate crystals

Slideshow of radiolarian diversity

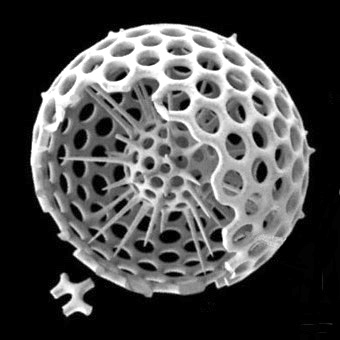
Cutaway schematic diagram of a spherical radiolarian shell

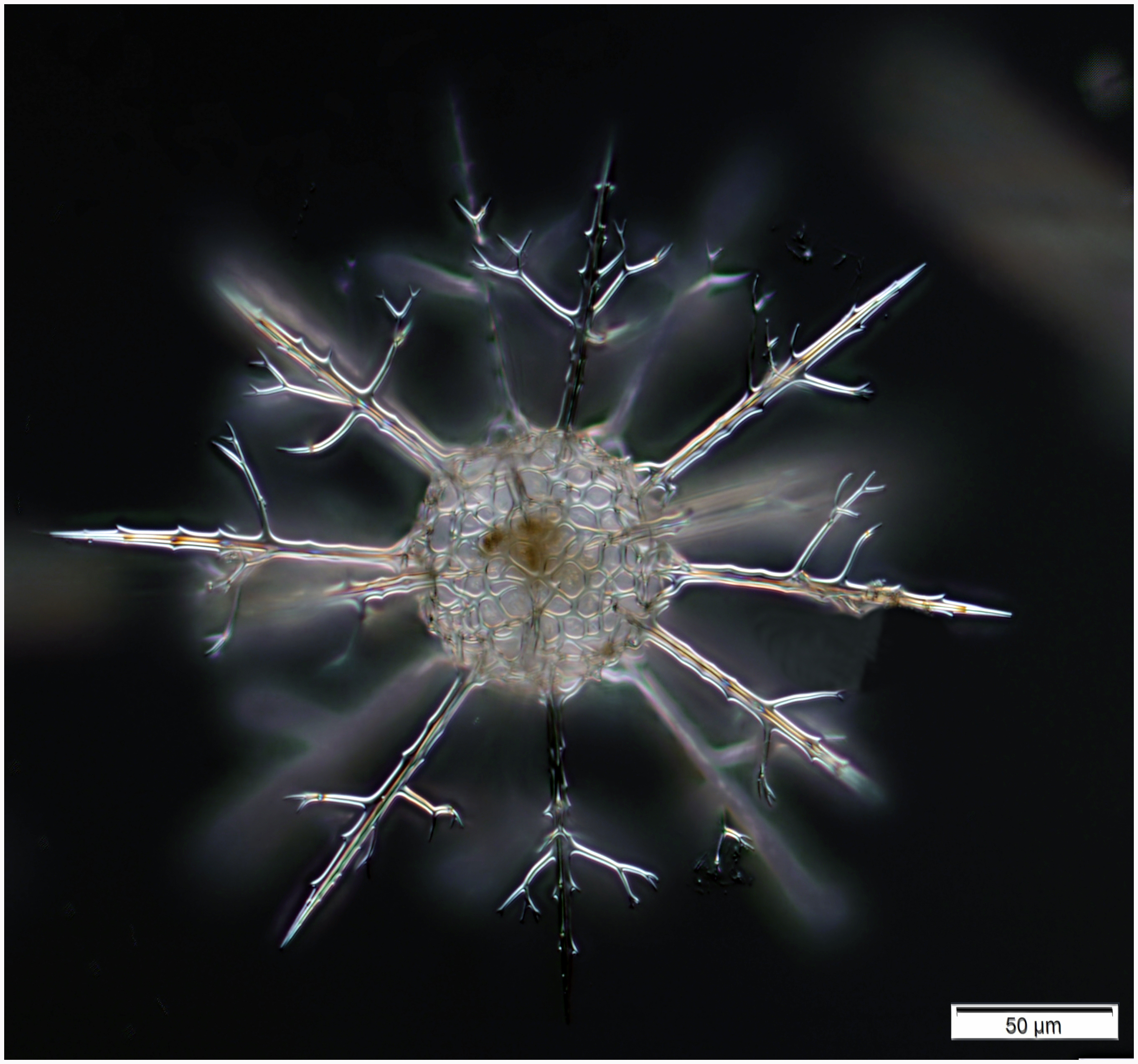
Cladococcus abietinus

So I set to work on seeking a solution to the Morphogenesis Equations on a sphere. The theory was that a spherical organism was subject to diffusion across its surface membrane by an alien substance, eg sea-water. The Equations were:

$$\frac{\partial \mathbf{U}}{\partial t} =  \phi(\nabla^2) \mathbf{U} +  G \mathbf{U}^2 - H\mathbf{U}V,$$

$$V = \mathbf{U}^2$$

The function $\mathbf{U}$, taken to be the radius vector from the centre to any point on the surface of the membrane, was argued to be representable as a series of normalised Legendre functions. The algebraic solution of the above equations ran to some 30 pages in my Thesis and are therefore not reproduced here. They are written in full in the book entitled "Morphogenesis" which is a tribute to Turing, edited by P. T. Saunders, published by North Holland, 1992.

The algebraic solution of the equations revealed a family of solutions, corresponding to a parameter n, taking values 2, 4. 6.

When I had solved the algebraic equations, I then used the computer to plot the shape of the resulting organisms. Turing told me that there were real organisms corresponding to what I had produced. He said that they were described and depicted in the records of the voyages of HMS Challenger in the 19th Century.

I solved the equations and produced a set of solutions which corresponded to the actual species of Radiolaria discovered by HMS Challenger in the 19th century. That expedition to the Pacific Ocean found eight variations in the growth patterns. These are shown in the following figures. The essential feature of the growth is the emergence of elongated "spines" protruding from the sphere at regular positions. Thus the species comprised two, six, twelve, and twenty, spine variations.

— Bernard Richards, 2006

=== Diversity and morphogenesis ===
Bernard Richards worked under the supervision of Alan Turing (1912–1954) at Manchester as one of Turing's last students, helping to validate Turing's theory of morphogenesis.

"Turing was keen to take forward the work that D'Arcy Thompson had published in On Growth and Form in 1917".

Turing and radiolarian morphology

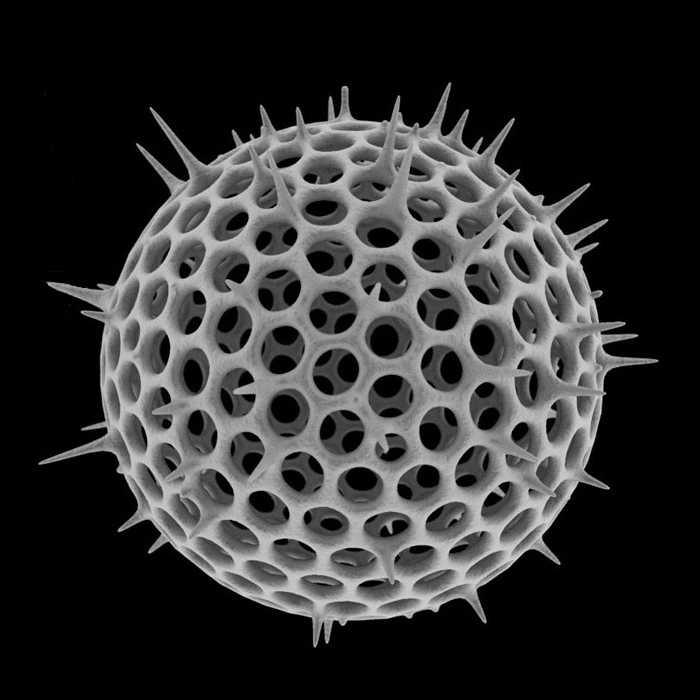
Shell of a spherical radiolarian

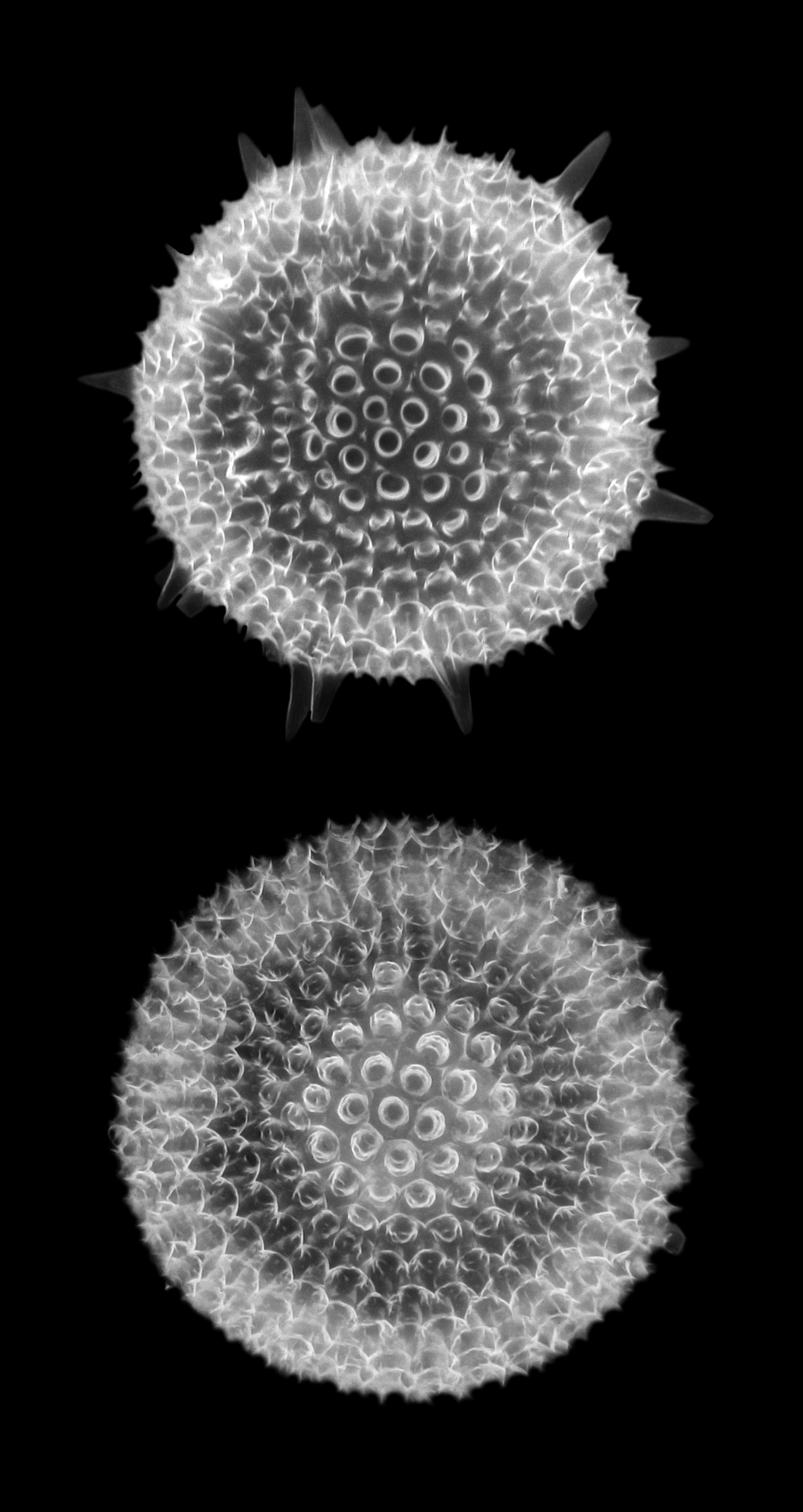
Shell micrographs

Computer simulations of Turing patterns on a sphere
closely replicate some radiolarian shell patterns

External videos
- Radiolarian geometry
- Ernst Haeckel's radiolarian engravings

Spine variations in radiolarians as discovered by HMS Challenger in the 19th century and drawn by Ernst Haeckel

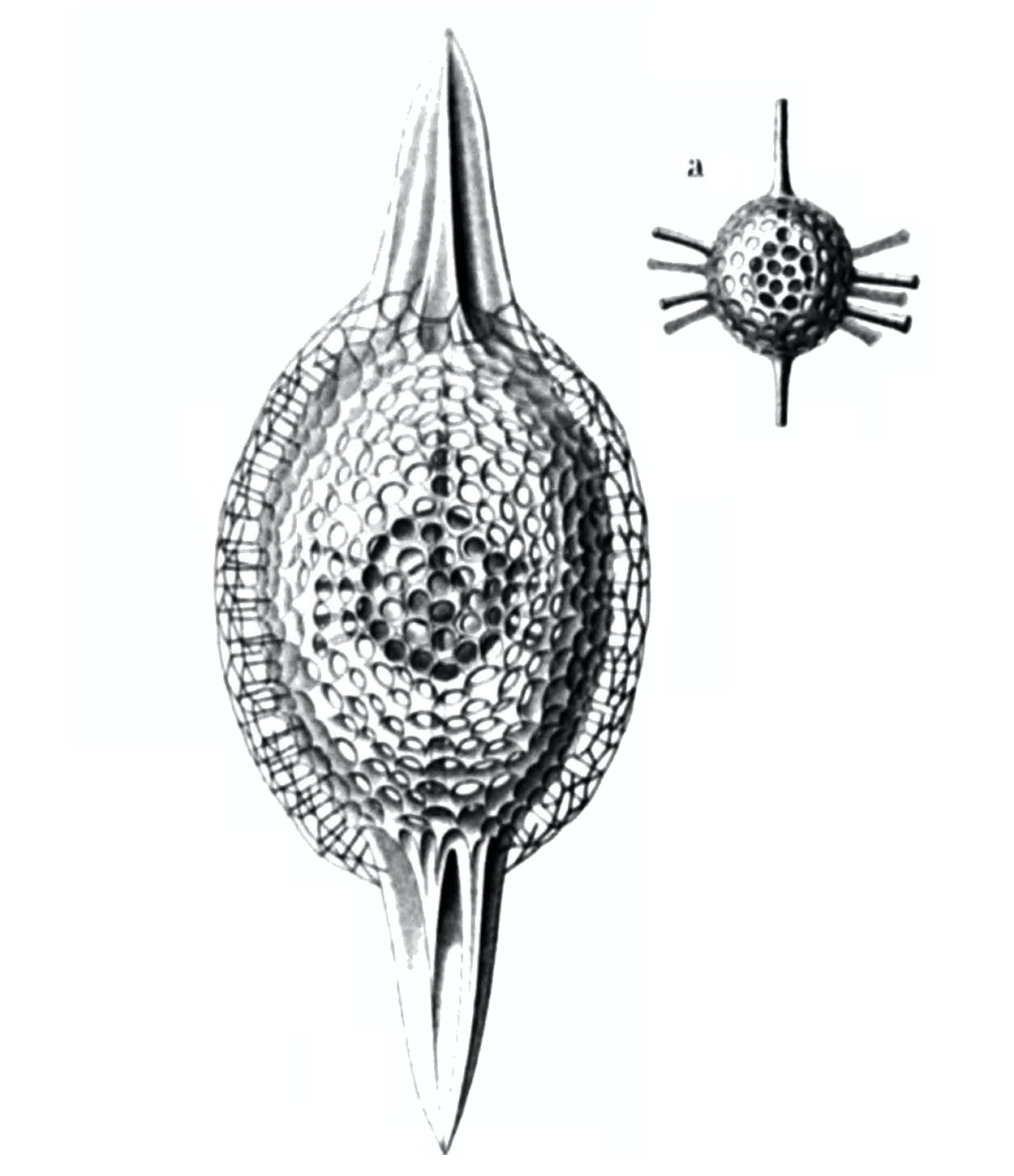
Cromyatractus tetracelyphus with 2 spines

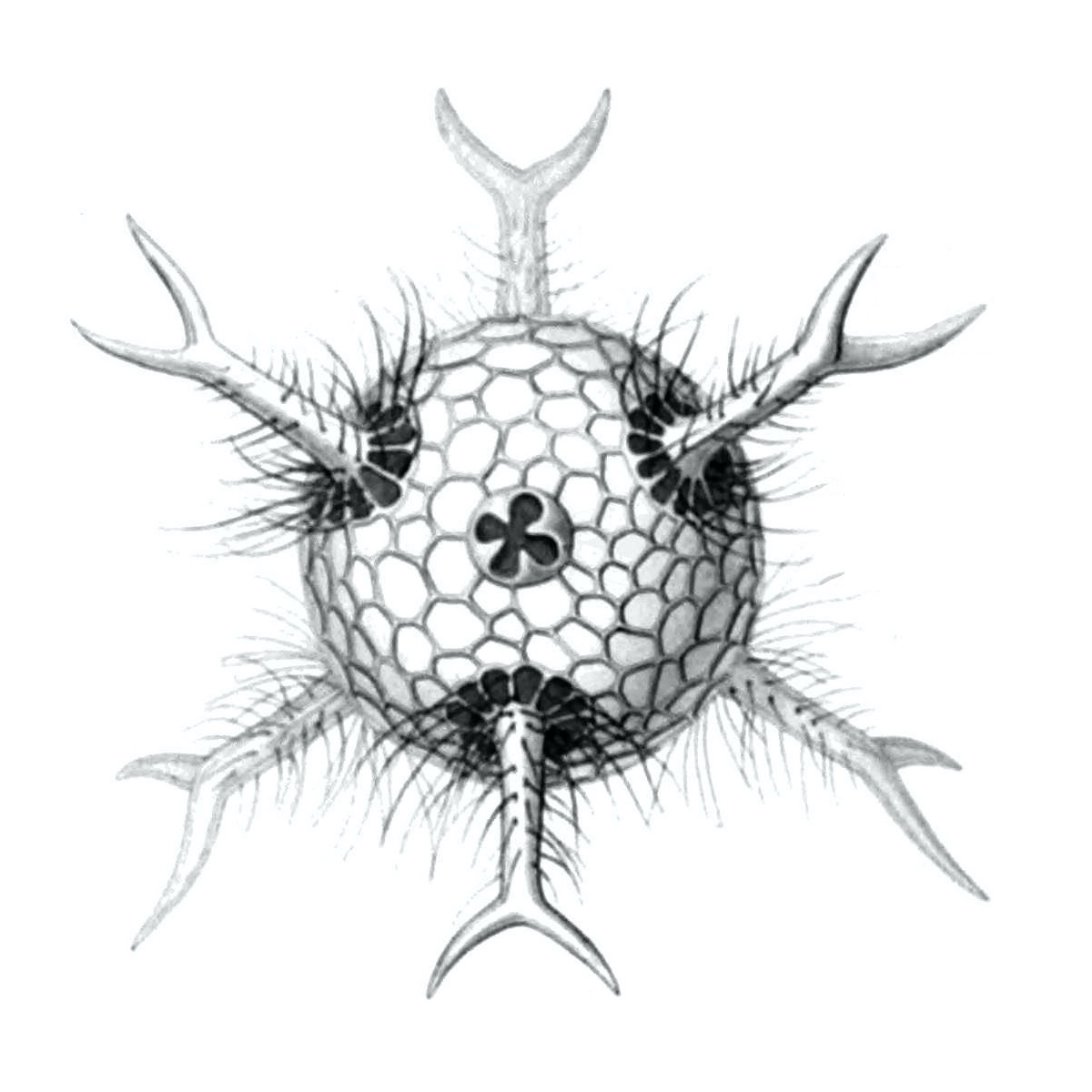
Circopus sexfurcus with 6 spines

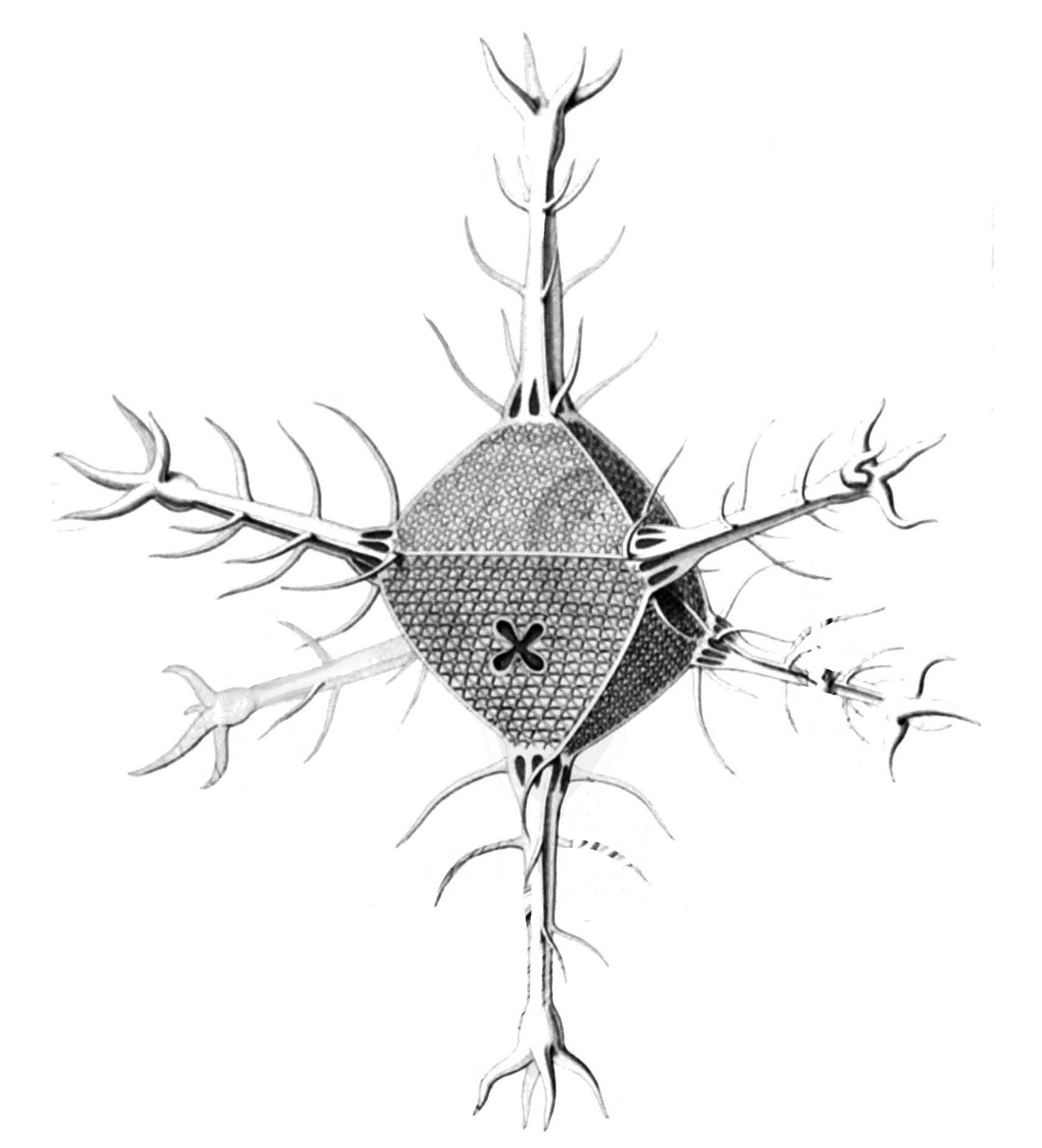
Circopurus octahedrus with 6 spines and 8 faces

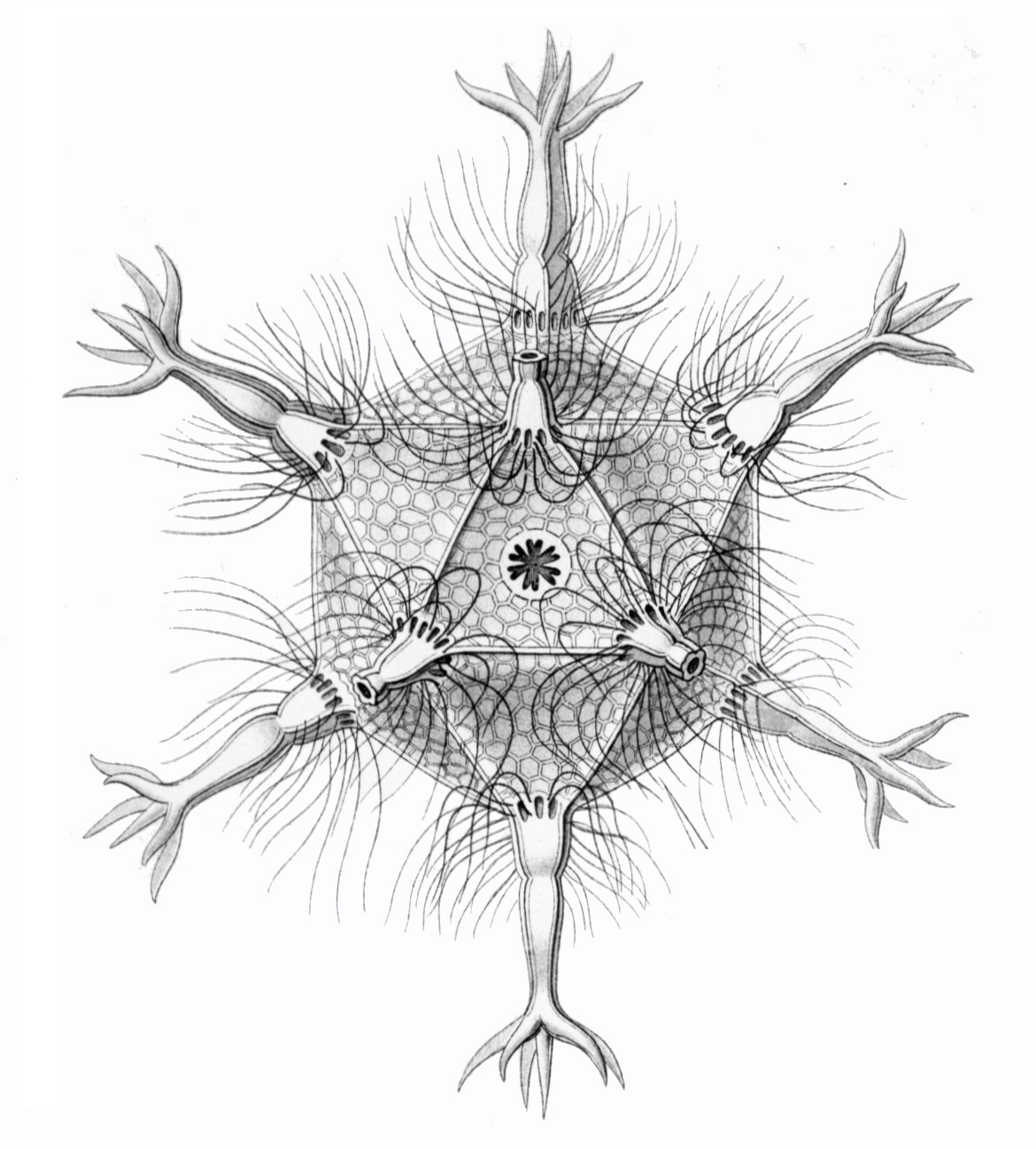
Circogonia icosahedra with 12 spines and 20 faces

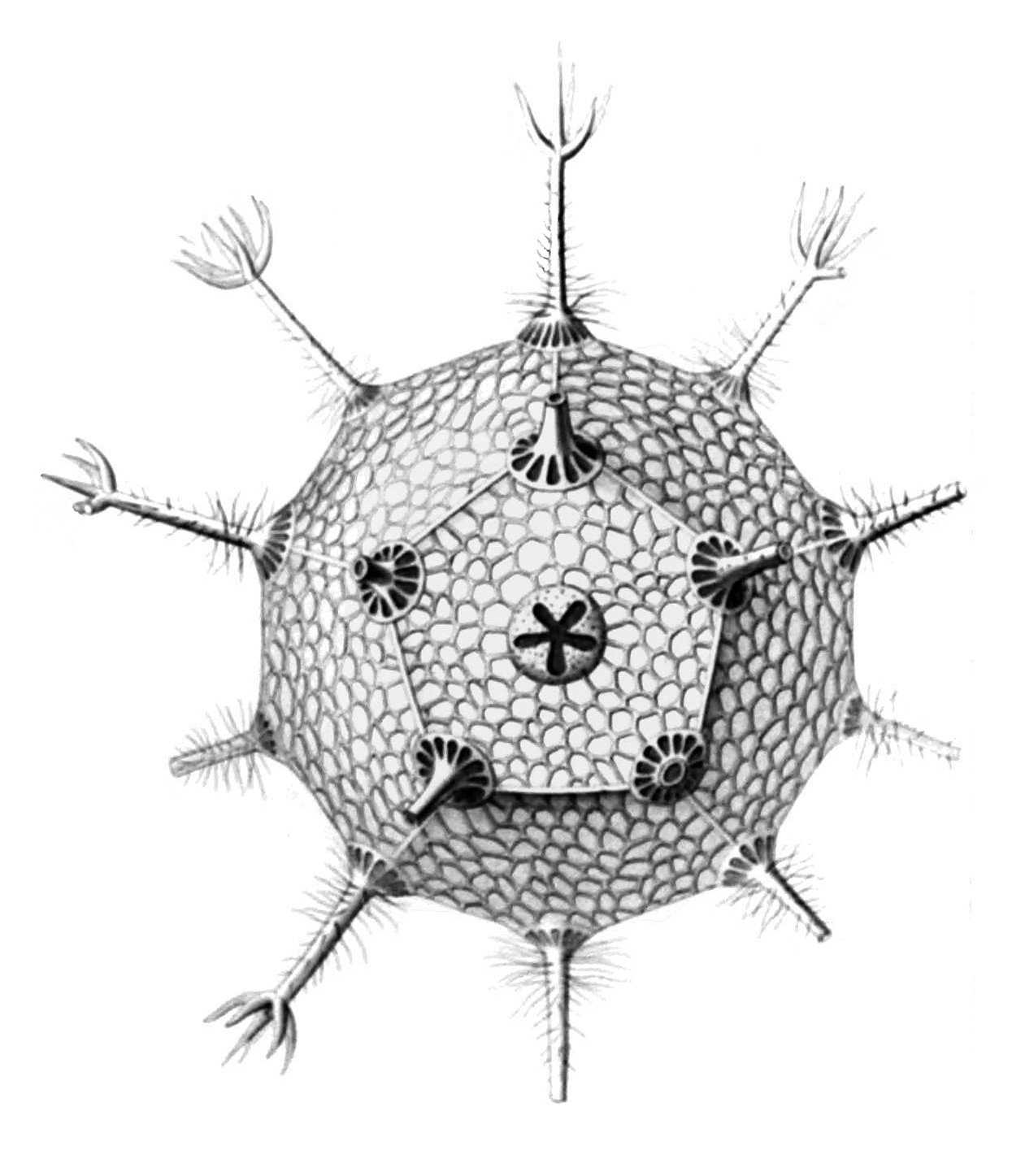
Circorrhegma dodecahedra with 20 (incompletely drawn) spines and 12 faces

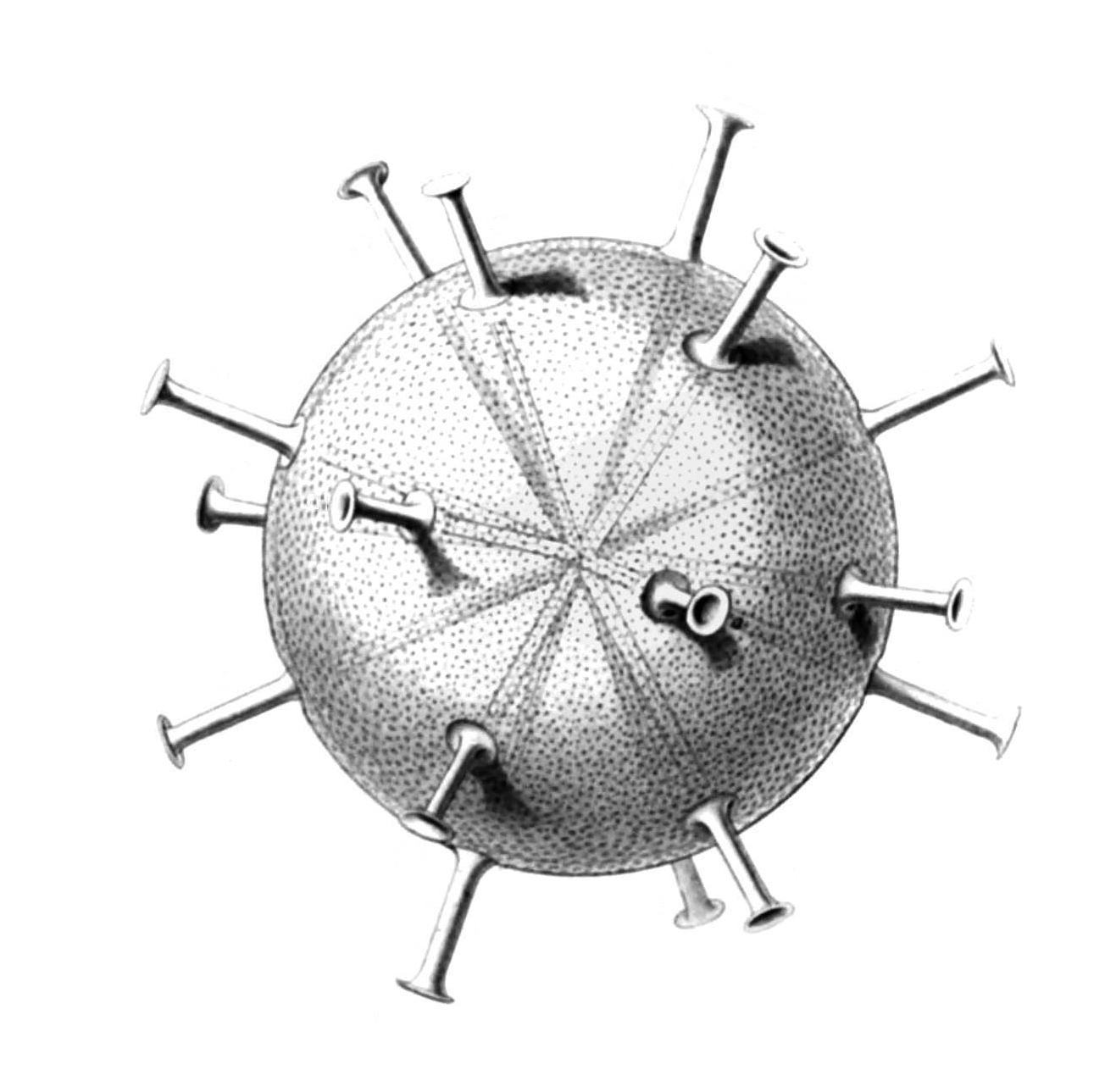
Cannocapsa stethoscopium with 20 spines

The gallery shows images of the radiolarians as extracted from drawings made by the German zoologist and polymath Ernst Haeckel in 1887.

- Turing, Alan (1952). "The Chemical Basis of Morphogenesis" (PDF). Philosophical Transactions of the Royal Society of London B. 237 (641): 37–72. Bibcode:1952RSPTB.237...37T. doi:10.1098/rstb.1952.0012. JSTOR 92463. S2CID 120437796.
- Richards, Bernard (2005-2006) "Turing, Richards and Morphogenesis", The Rutherford Journal, Volume 1.

== Fossil record ==
Fossil radiolarian

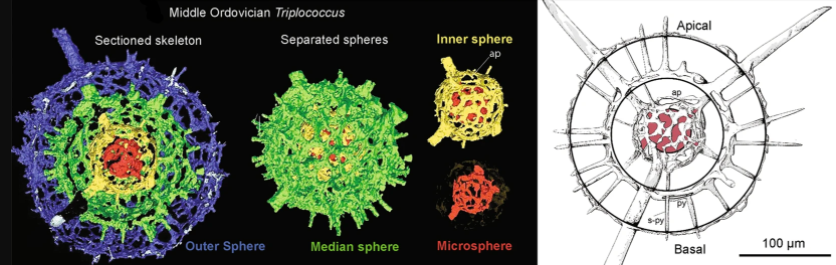
X-ray microtomography of Triplococcus acanthicus
This is a microfossil from the Middle Ordovician with four nested spheres. The innermost sphere is highlighted red. Each segment is shown at the same scale.

The earliest known radiolaria date to the very start of the Cambrian period, appearing in the same beds as the first small shelly fauna—they may even be terminal Precambrian in age. They have significant differences from later radiolaria, with a different silica lattice structure and few, if any, spikes on the test. About ninety percent of known radiolarian species are extinct. The skeletons, or tests, of ancient radiolarians are used in geological dating, including for oil exploration and determination of ancient climates.

Some common radiolarian fossils include Actinomma, Heliosphaera and Hexadoridium.

== See also ==
- Radiolarite
