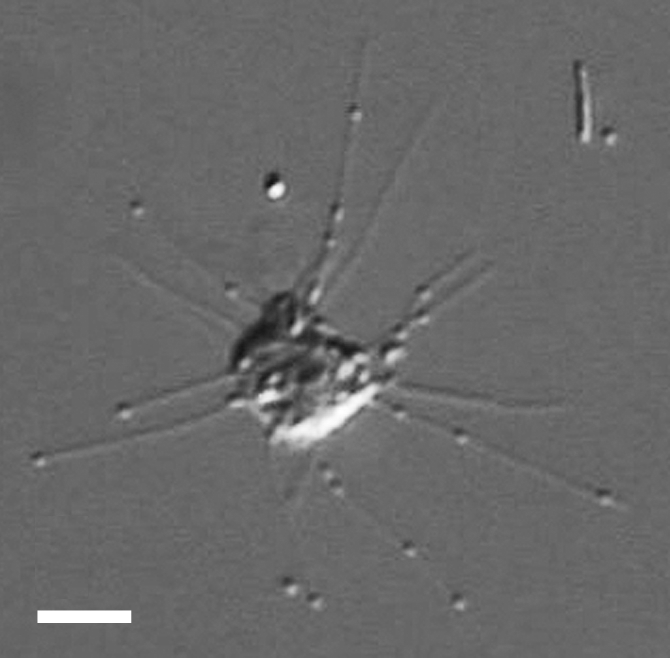
- Reticulamoeba gemmipara

Scientific classification
- Domain: Eukaryota
- Clade: Sar
- Clade: Rhizaria
- Phylum: Cercozoa
- Subphylum: Filosa
- Class: Granofilosea
- Order: Leucodictyida; Cavalier-Smith 1993, emend. 2003, emend. 2009

Families
- Leucodictyidae; Massisteriidae

= Leucodictyida =

Order of protists

Leucodictyids are heterotrophic amoeboid protists that comprise the order Leucodictyida in the phylum Cercozoa.

== Morphology ==
Leucodictyids are biciliate amoebae with branching filopodia that are capable of fusing temporarily with each other to form structures known as meroplasmodia. These filopodia can bear extrusomes, and are appressed to the substrate while supported in part by irregularly arranged microtubules. Inside the cell itself, an important characteristic is the presence of tubular mitochondrial cristae.

== Taxonomy ==
Leucodictyida was described in 1993 as a monotypic order containing only the family Leucodictyidae. Later, in 2003, it was emended to also contain the family Massisteriidae. It currently contains a total of 4 genera.

- Family Leucodictyidae Cavalier-Smith 1993
  - Leucodictyon Grell 1991
  - Reticulamoeba Grell 1994
- Family Massisteriidae Cavalier-Smith 1993
  - Massisteria Larsen & Patterson 1990
  - Minimassisteria Arndt & Cavalier-Smith in Howe et al. 2011
