= Massisteria =

Scientific classification
- Domain: Eukaryota
- Clade: Sar
- Clade: Rhizaria
- Phylum: Cercozoa
- Subphylum: Filosa
- Class: Granofilosea
- Order: Leucodictyida
- Family: Massisteriidae
- Genus: Massisteria; Larsen & Patterson, 1990

Species
- M. marina; M. voersi

Genus of single-celled organisms

Massisteria is a genus of Cercozoa. They are naked protists with a central cell body from which several delicately thin and stiff pseudopodia extend, each one bearing a small number of granules. Their pseudopodia remain adhered to the substrate, as is typical among leucodictyids. The cell body has two flagella that, during feeding, are held in place.

== Taxonomy ==
The genus has two described species:

- Massisteria marina Larsen & Patterson, 1990
- Massisteria voersi Mylnikov et al., 2015
