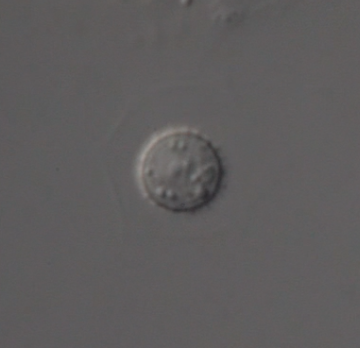
- Hedriocystis pellucida

Scientific classification
- Domain: Eukaryota
- Clade: Sar
- Clade: Rhizaria
- Phylum: Cercozoa
- Subphylum: Filosa
- Class: Granofilosea
- Order: Desmothoracida; Hertwig & Lesser 1874, emend. Honigberg et al. 1964
- Family: Clathrulinidae; Claus 1874

Type genus
- Clathrulina Cienkowski 1867

Genera
- See text

Diversity
- 10 species

Synonyms
- Cryptaxohelida; Desmothoraca Hertwig & Lesser 1874; Clathrulinida Starobogatov 1980

= Desmothoracid =

Order of single-celled organisms

Order Desmothoracida, the desmothoracids, are a group of heliozoan protists, usually sessile and found in freshwater environments. The adult is a spherical cell around 10-20 μm in diameter surrounded by a perforated organic lorica, or shell, with many radial pseudopods projecting through the holes to capture food. These are supported by small bundles of microtubules that arise near a point on the nuclear membrane. Unlike other heliozoans, the microtubules are not in any regular geometric array, there does not appear to be a microtubule organizing center, and there is no distinction between the outer and inner cytoplasm.

Reproduction takes place by the budding-off of small motile cells, usually with two flagella. Later these are lost, and the pseudopods and lorica are formed. Typically, a single lengthened pseudopod will secrete a hollow stalk that attaches the cell to the substrate. The form of the flagella, the tubular cristae within the mitochondria, and other characters have led to the suggestion that the desmothoracids belong among what is now the Cercozoa. This was later confirmed by genetic studies.

As of the year 2000, the order Desmothoracida contained five genera with a total of 10 species.

- Order Desmothoracida Hartwig & Lesser 1874 emend. Honigberg et al. 1964
  - Family Clathrulinidae Claus 1874
    - Genus Clathrulina Cienkowski 1867 [Podosphaera Archer 1868 non Kunze 1823; Elaster Grimm 1872; Eleaster (sic) Schmidt 1913; Orbulinella Entz 1877]
      - Species Clathrulina elegans Cienkowski 1867 [Clathrulina ovalis (von Daday 1885) Deflandre, 1926; Clathrulina cienkowskii ovalis von Daday 1885; Clathrulina cienkowskii Mereschkowsky 1879; Clathrulina stuhlmanni Schaudinn 1897; Podosphaera haeckeliana Archer 1868; Elaster greeffi Grimm 1872]
      - Species Clathrulina smaragdea (Entz 1877) Mikrjukov 2000 [Orbulinella smaragdea Entz 1877; Orbulinella salina Labbe 1924]
    - Genus Hedriocystis Hertwig & Lesser 1874
      - Species Hedriocystis pellucida Hertwig & Lesser 1874
      - Species Hedriocystis minor Siemensma 1991
      - Species Hedriocystis zhadani Mikrjukov 2000
    - Genus Penardiophrys Mikrjukov 2000
      - Species Penardiophrys reticulata (Penard 1904) Mikrjukov 2000 [Hedriocystis reticulata Penard 1904]
      - Species Penardiophrys spinifera (Brown 1918) Mikrjukov 2000 [Hedriocystis spinifera Brown 1918]
    - Genus Cienkowskya Schaudinn 1896 non Regel & Rach 1859 non Solms 1867 [Cienkowskia Weldon & Hickson 1909 non Rostafinski 1873 non Schweinfurth 1867 non Solms 1867; Wagneria Cienkowsky 1881 non Robineau-Desvoidy 1830 non Gistl 1848 non Alenitzin 1873 non Lemaire 1857 non Hesse 1912 non Heilprin 1887 non McCook 1895 non Jedlicka 1935 non Denier 1933 non Meladze 1967; Monomastigocystis de Saedeleer 1930]
      - Species Cienkowskya mereschkovckii (Cienkowsky 1881) Schaudinn 1896 [Wagneria mereschkowskyi Cienkowsky 1881]
      - Species Cienkowskya brachypous (De Saedeleer 1930) Mikrjukov 2000 [Monomastigocystis brachypous de Saedeleer 1930; Hedriocystis brachypous (De Saedeleer 1930) Siemensma 1991]
    - Genus Actinosphaeridium Zacharias 1893 [Actinopshaeridium (sic)]
      - Species Actinosphaeridium pedatus Zacharias 1893 [Nuclearia caulescens Penard 1903]
