= Heliomorpha =

Scientific classification
- Domain: Eukaryota
- Clade: Sar
- Clade: Rhizaria
- Phylum: Cercozoa
- Subphylum: Endomyxa
- Family: Heliomorphidae; Cavalier-Smith & Bass in Bass et al. 2009
- Genus: Heliomorpha; Cavalier-Smith & Bass in Bass et al. 2009

Type species
- Heliomorpha mucosa Cavalier-Smith & Bass in Bass et al. 2009

Species
- Heliomorpha depressa Cavalier-Smith & Bass in Bass et al. 2009; Heliomorpha mucosa Cavalier-Smith & Bass in Bass et al. 2009

Synonyms
- Heliomorpha: "Dimorpha" pro parte; "Dimorphella" pro parte; "Dimorphiella" pro parte; Heliomorphidae: "Dimorphyidae" pro parte

Genus of single-celled organisms

Heliomorpha is a genus of Cercozoa, placed in its own family, Heliomorphidae. It used to be partly known as Dimorpha, but that name was a junior synonym several times over.
