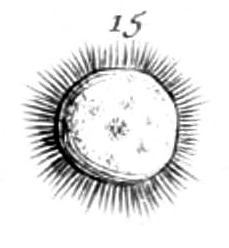
- Heliozoan depicted by Louis Joblot, 1718

Scientific classification
- Domain: Eukaryota

Groups included
- Actinophryida (in Stramenopiles); Centroplasthelida (in Haptista); Desmothoracida (in Rhizaria); Gymnosphaerida (in Rhizaria); Microhelida (in Pancryptista); Taxopodida (in Rhizaria); Plus select genera in other groups (see text)

= Heliozoa =

Group of protists with spherical bodies

Heliozoa, commonly known as sun-animalcules, are microbial eukaryotes (protists) with stiff arms (axopodia) radiating from their spherical bodies, which are responsible for their common name. The axopodia are microtubule-supported projections from the amoeboid cell body, and are variously used for capturing food, sensation, movement, and attachment. They are similar to Radiolaria, but they are distinguished from them by lacking central capsules and other complex skeletal elements, although some produce simple scales and spines. They may be found in both freshwater and marine environments.

== Classification ==
Originally the heliozoa were treated together as a formal taxon Heliozoa or Heliozoea, with the rank of class or phylum, but it has been realised that they are polyphyletic, as the various orders show notable differences and are no longer believed to be descended from a single common ancestor. Instead, "heliozoa" is regarded as a descriptive term applying to various lines of protists:

- Actinophryida (currently in Stramenopiles)
- Centroplasthelida (currently in Haptista)
- Desmothoracida and Gymnosphaerida (currently in Rhizaria > Cercozoa)
- Taxopodida (currently in Rhizaria > Radiolaria)
- Microhelida (currently in Pancryptista)

Several nucleariids were once considered heliozoa, but they do not have microtubule-supported axopods and so are now considered filose amoeboids instead.

Freshwater heliozoan feeding on small flagellated algae

In 2012, Cavalier-Smith proposed maintaining the name Heliozoa as a formal taxon by reducing it to only Heliomorpha, Microheliella and centrohelids, which are the most species-abundant group of heliozoa to date. He established a phylum Heliozoa emended to include only two classes: Centrohelea, the centrohelids; and Endohelea, a smaller group containing only the genera Heliomorpha and Microheliella. From 2015 onwards, Cavalier-Smith et al. yet another definition for Heliozoa, exclusively as a monotypic subphylum of Haptista containing only the class Centrohelea. This renewed circumscription never reached consensus, and Heliozoa continues to be used in the same regard as the traditional, polyphyletic category including amoebae other than centrohelids.

=== Phylogeny ===
The heliozoa are a polyphyletic grouping of various protists that have independently evolved axopodial arms. Some of the heliozoan groups are intermingled in the supergroup Rhizaria with radiolarians, their mostly marine counterpart.

- Diaphoretickes
  - - SAR
      - Stramenopiles
        - Raphidomonadea
          Actinophryida
      - Rhizaria
        - Cercozoa
          - Granofilosea
            Desmothoracida
        - ?
          Gymnosphaerida
        - Radiolaria
          - Acantharea (classical radiolarians)
          - - Taxopodida
            - Polycystinea (classical radiolarians)
    - Haptista
      Centroplasthelida
  - - Pancryptista
      Microhelida
    - Plants
