= Glossary of protistology =

List of terms related to protist research

This glossary provides an overview of terms used in the description of protists, eukaryotic organisms that are neither animals nor plants nor fungi, as well as their life cycles, feeding mechanisms, and relationship with the environment. The term "protist" embraces all organisms that descended from the last eukaryotic common ancestor except those three "higher" kingdoms of life; as such, protists usually follow the same basic principles of biology as them. Nevertheless, protists exhibit almost all of the spectrum of biological characteristics expressed in eukaryotes, including many unique adaptations that are covered here.

== A ==
acellular
Lacking cells.
aerobe
Organism that thrives in oxygen-rich environments. Contrast: anaerobe.
agamont
Life phase formed through the development of the zygote, which in turn undergoes meiosis to produce gametes. Contrast: gamont.
aggregative multicellularity
Also aggregative fruiting and aggregation. Behavior of certain slime molds (e.g., dictyostelids, acrasids) consisting of many individual cells aggregating together to form the fruiting bodies, known as sorocarps. It is considered a separate type of multicellularity from clonal multicellularity.
alga
Plural algae. Informal (polyphyletic) category of all organisms capable of performing photosynthesis, with the exception of plants.
alkenone
Very long (more than 34-carbon) polyunsaturated ketones – with double bonds in the E configuration – that are putative storage lipids produced by haptophytes of the clade Prymnesiophyceae since at least the Aptian.
amitochondriate
Refers to eukaryotes that lack a functioning mitochondrion. Some have mitochondrion-related organelles, namely hydrogenosomes (e.g., the trichomonad Trichomonas) and mitosomes (e.g., the diplomonad Giardia), while others have lost these organelles entirely (e.g., the oxymonad Monocercomonoides).
amoeba
Also amoeboid. Plural amoebae, also amoebas. Eukaryotic cell capable of developing pseudopodia. It is also the name of the genus Amoeba.
amoeboflagellate
Also amoebomastigote. Term usually reserved for single-celled protists that, during their life cycle, develop a flagellate life stage and a separate amoeba stage (as in Naegleria), with the latter lacking basal bodies. Protists that have both flagella and pseudopodia in the same life stage (as in Cercomonas) are usually referred to as amoeboid flagellates instead. However, the terms are sometimes used interchangeably.
amoebozoan
Any member of Amoebozoa, a phylum of around 2,400 species containing many of the classical amoebae and many slime molds. They are ancestrally biflagellates, but many lost one or both flagella. The group is closely related to obazoans, together forming the clade Amorphea.
amorphean
Any member of Amorphea, the clade that groups obazoans and amoebozoans. Among amorpheans, the ability to produce multinucleated cells is particularly frequent, and is considered their ancestral trait. The CRuMs clade is closely related to amorpheans; the two groups compose the clade Podiata.
amphizoic
Free-living amoebae that are also capable of living as parasites and infecting animals, including humans. Major examples are the genera Naegleria, Acanthamoeba and Balamuthia.
anaerobe
Organism that occupies low-oxygen environments, such as the animal gut and aquatic sediments. Anaerobic protists (e.g., metamonads) tend to evolve a drastically different mitochondrial metabolism. Contrast: aerobe.
anastomosis
Action performed by certain amoebae of joining together reticulopodia to form a network.
ancyromonad
Any member of Ancyromonadida, a group of 35 species of bean-shaped biflagellates commonly found in many marine, freshwater, and soil environments.
anisogamous
The condition of performing the type of sexual reproduction known as anisogamy. Contrast: isogamous.
anisogamy
Type of sexual reproduction where the gametes have different sizes and/or morphologies. Contrast: isogamy.
anterior
In single-celled organisms, refers to the region of the cell towards the direction of movement. Contrast: posterior.
antheridium
Male gametangium; produces male gametes.
apical complex

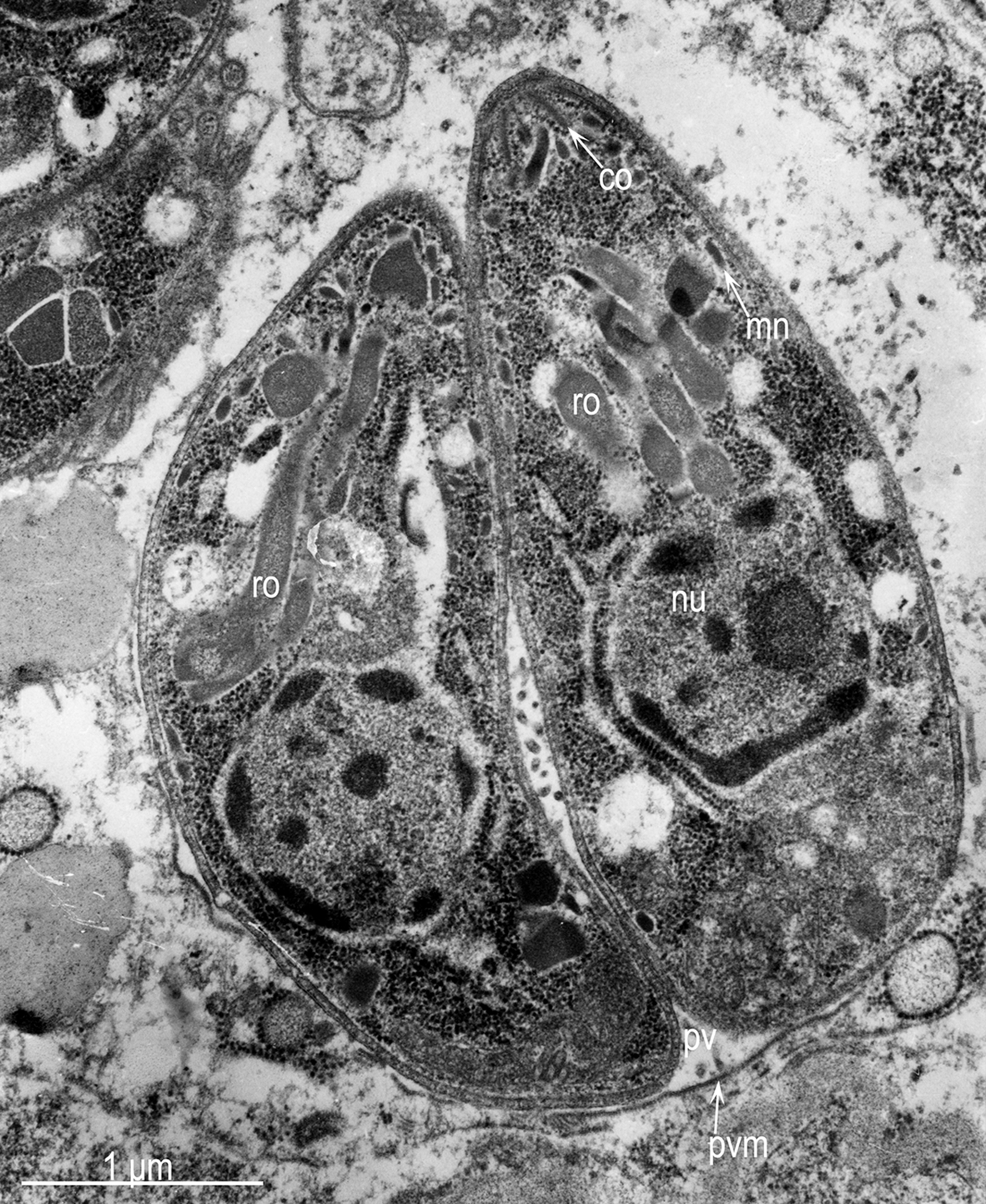
Transmission electron micrograph of two apicomplexan tachyzoites showing the cell nucleus (nu) and components of the apical complex: conoid (co), micronemes (mn), rhoptries (ro).

Specialized set of organelles found in the anterior region of the sporozoites and merozoites of apicomplexans, used for penetrating host cells. It is normally composed of the conoid, one or more pre-conoidal rings, the polar ring, and the secretory rhoptries and micronemes, which are filled with proteic and lipidic molecules.
apicomplexan
Any member of Apicomplexa, a group of more than 6,000 species of single-celled, parasitic protists that use an apical complex to penetrate cells of their animal hosts. Their life cycle consists of a double or triple-phase alternation of generations, each with typical infection, growth, and multiplication stages. In coccidians and haemosporidians, the stages are: sporogony, where a zygote differentiates into sporocysts that produce sporozoites, which penetrate cells; merogony, where the sporozoites differentiate into meronts and produce merozoites; and gamogony, where some merozoites differentiate into gamonts and begin producing gametes. In other apicomplexans there is no merogony, and sporozoites differentiate into meronts directly.
apicoplast
Highly reduced plastid found in apicomplexans; its function may be related to the metabolism of fatty acids. It is the most intensely studied organelle of sporozoites.
aplanospore
Non-motile spore. Contrast: zoospore.
apusomonad
Any member of Apusomonadida, a small group of 28 species of gliding biflagellates closely related to opisthokonts and breviates. They usually have elongated cells, a ventral feeding grove, and a characteristic proboscis; some can produce pseudopodia.
archaeplastid
Any member of Archaeplastida, a large clade containing mostly photosynthetic eukaryotes that obtained their chloroplasts directly through an endosymbiosis with a cyanobacterium. Groups included are picozoans, rhodelphids, red algae, glaucophytes, and green algae, from which plants evolved. The clade is known as Plantae in some classifications.
Archezoa
Also Archaezoa. Refers to amitochondriate protists; used in older hypotheses where these protists were considered more primitive than those with mitochondria. Such hypotheses were later disproved, as these protists evolved from mitochondrion-bearing ancestors. Meaning "original creatures", the term was initially a synonym for protozoa, coined in 1852 by Maximilian Perty.
auxospore
Specialized cell in the life cycle of diatoms that is formed by differentiation of the zygote: it produces an organic wall and expands to restore the maximum size characteristic of the diatom species, often inserting silica elements (namely the incunabula and the perizonium) into the wall during this process.

== B ==
biflagellate
Flagellate with two flagella.
bradyzoite
Also bradyzoic merozoite. A merozoite characterized by sessile, slow growth and replication, present in a chronic coccidial infection. Contrast: tachyzoite.
branching or network-forming amoebae
Abbreviated BNFA. Naked amoebae with reticulopodia that branch and can sometimes anastomose (e.g., granofiloseans, vampyrellids, varioseans).
breviate
Any member of the Breviatea, a small group of 4 species of anaerobic amoeboflagellates that produce filopodia, closely related to opisthokonts and apusomonads. All described breviates have mitochondrion-related organelles.

== C ==
cell body
In flagellates, portion of the cell that excludes flagella.
chloroplast
Specialized organelle found in eukaryotic algae, capable of performing photosynthesis. It derived from an endosymbiotic cyanobacterium. In some lineages, it has been lost or degraded into a different organelle (e.g., apicoplast).
cilium
Plural cilia. Synonym of eukaryotic flagellum or undulipodium. Its usage highly depends on the author: some reserve it for shorter appendages, and use flagellum for longer ones, while others use it for all eukaryotic flagella.
clonal multicellularity
Development of most multicellular organisms (e.g., animals, plants, fungi) where their multi-celled forms arise from a series of dividing cells that remain closely connected and, through additional cell division, may differentiate into further cell types. It contrasts with aggregative multicellularity, where multi-celled structures arise from the clustering of cells that otherwise reproduce separately. Among protists, clonal multicellularity is displayed in a variety of distantly related clades (e.g., green algae, red algae, brown algae, golden algae, oomycetes, ichthyosporeans). In a few cases it is facultative, as in the colonies of choanoflagellates.
coccidian
Any member of Coccidia, one of the principal groups of apicomplexans, present in vertebrates. Some species of the coccidian genus Eimeria cause the disease known as coccidiosis.
coccidiosis
Plural coccidioses. Disease caused by the coccidian genus Eimeria, primarily affecting poultry farms.
coccoid
Refers to single-celled (Note: Some single-celled protists, particularly flagellates such as choanoflagellates and many coccoid algae, are capable of forming colonies and may be labeled as multicellular in some instances.) algae without flagella (monadoid) or pseudopodia (amoeboid).
collodictyonid
Any member of Collodictyonidae, a family of seven species of aquatic phagotrophic flagellates with two to four posterior flagella.
conoid
Cone-shaped structural unit located at the anterior cell pole of apicomplexans, composed of helically-running microtubules.
crista
Plural cristae. Folds found in the inner membrane of mitochondria. The shape of these folds has been used as a taxonomic character to distinguish between major groups of eukaryotes (see discicristate).
CRuMs
Small clade of flagellates most closely related to Amorphea, named after the initials of its members: collodictyonids, rigifilids, mantamonads, and now also contains Glissandrida. They are usually biflagellates, but some collodictyonids develop four flagella, and rigifilids are filose amoebae.
cryptist
Any member of Cryptista, the phylum that contains cryptomonads, katablepharids, and the species Palpitomonas bilix. They are distinguished by the presence of ejectisomes, although they are absent in P. bilix, the most basal cryptist.
cryptomonad

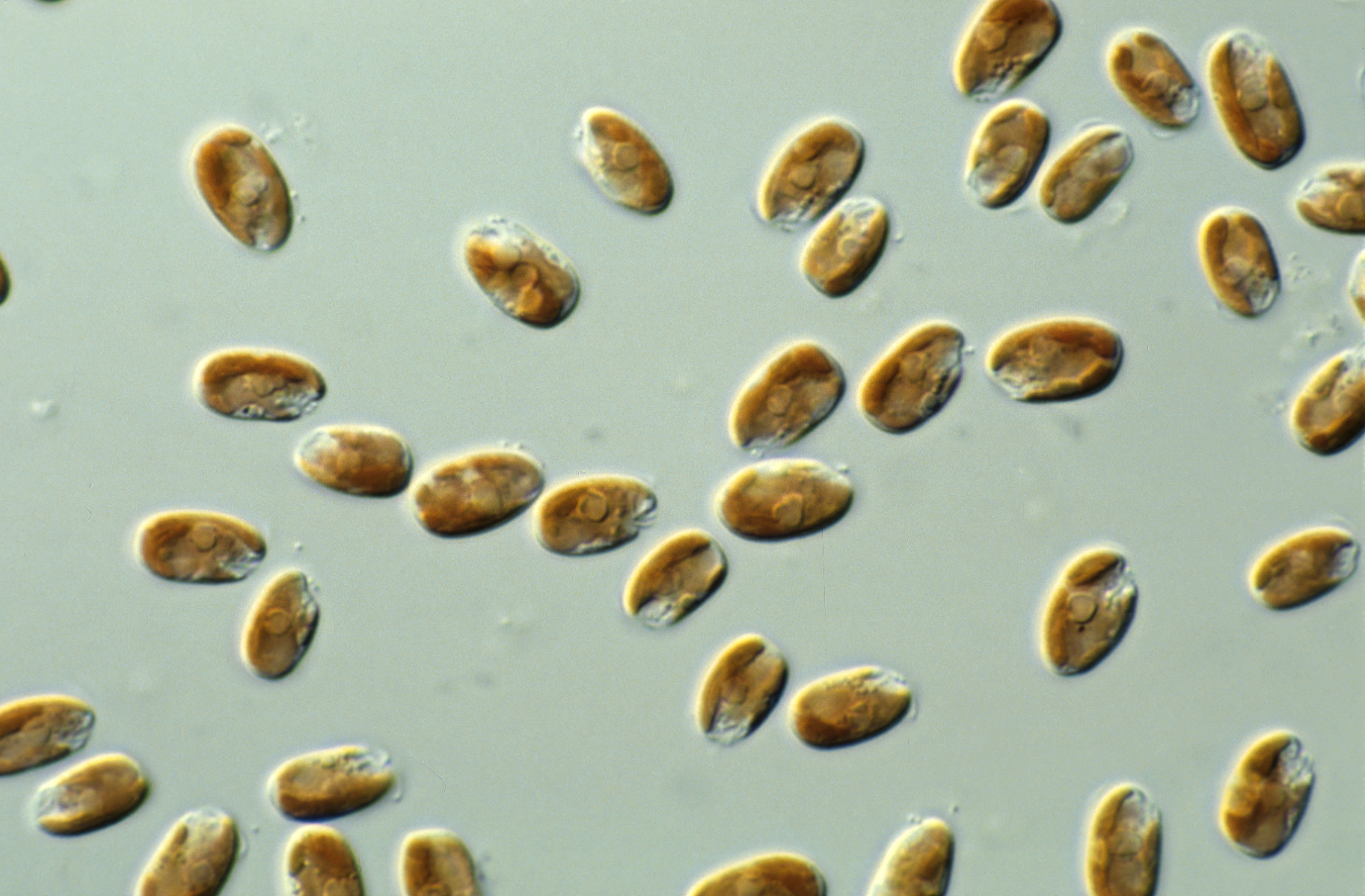
Cryptomonad culture

Also cryptophyte. Any member of Cryptomonada, a group of aquatic flagellated algae comprising more than 100 species. In botanical nomenclature, they are known as the algal division Cryptophyta. Their chloroplasts were obtained through endosymbiosis with a red alga. Their ejectisomes are composed of two coiled ribbons or "scrolls", as opposed to their closest relatives katablepharids which have ejectisomes of one scroll each.
cyanelle
Historical term for chloroplasts found in glaucophytes, later renamed to muroplasts. It was coined by Adolf Pascher in 1929.
cyst
Non-motile, resistant life stage that develops in response to stressful environmental conditions as a survival mechanism, allowing the organism to persist (resting cyst) or leading to the production of gametes (sexual cyst).
cystozoite
Also cystozoic merozoite. Synonym of bradyzoite.

== D ==
Diaphoretickes
A large clade that includes most of the photosynthetic eukaryotes and their heterotrophic relatives. It contains groups such as the SAR clade, the archaeplastids, haptists and cryptists.
discicristate
Referring to organisms whose mitochondria have disc-shaped cristae.
discobid
A member of Discoba, the clade that includes Discicristata and Jakobida.

== E ==
egg cell
Female gamete which fuses with a sperm cell to form a zygote; produced within an oogonium.
ejectisome
Also ejectosome. Large, roll-shaped explosive organelle, identified in cryptomonads, katablepharids and some prasinophytes; occasionally called trichocysts. The term was coined by Everett Anderson in 1962.
endozoite
Also tachyzoic merozoite. Synonym of tachyzoite.
eruptive
Refers to a unique generation of pseudopodia consisting of sudden outwards and lateral bulging during locomotion; characteristic of heterolobosean amoebae.
excavate
Informal name for various deep-branching clades of eukaryotes, previously known collectively as Excavata. The "typical excavate" cell is a biflagellate with a ventral groove used for suspension feeding. Metamonads, malawimonads and discobids are the three excavate groups.
extrusome
Membrane-bound organelle found in eukaryotes that is capable of moving material contained within to the exterior of the cell. Has various functions, for example, Ancoracysta twista has extrusomes that immobilize their prey.

== F ==
fertilization
Fusion of two gametes during sexual reproduction to form a zygote; typically includes the processes of plasmogamy and karyogamy.
filopodium

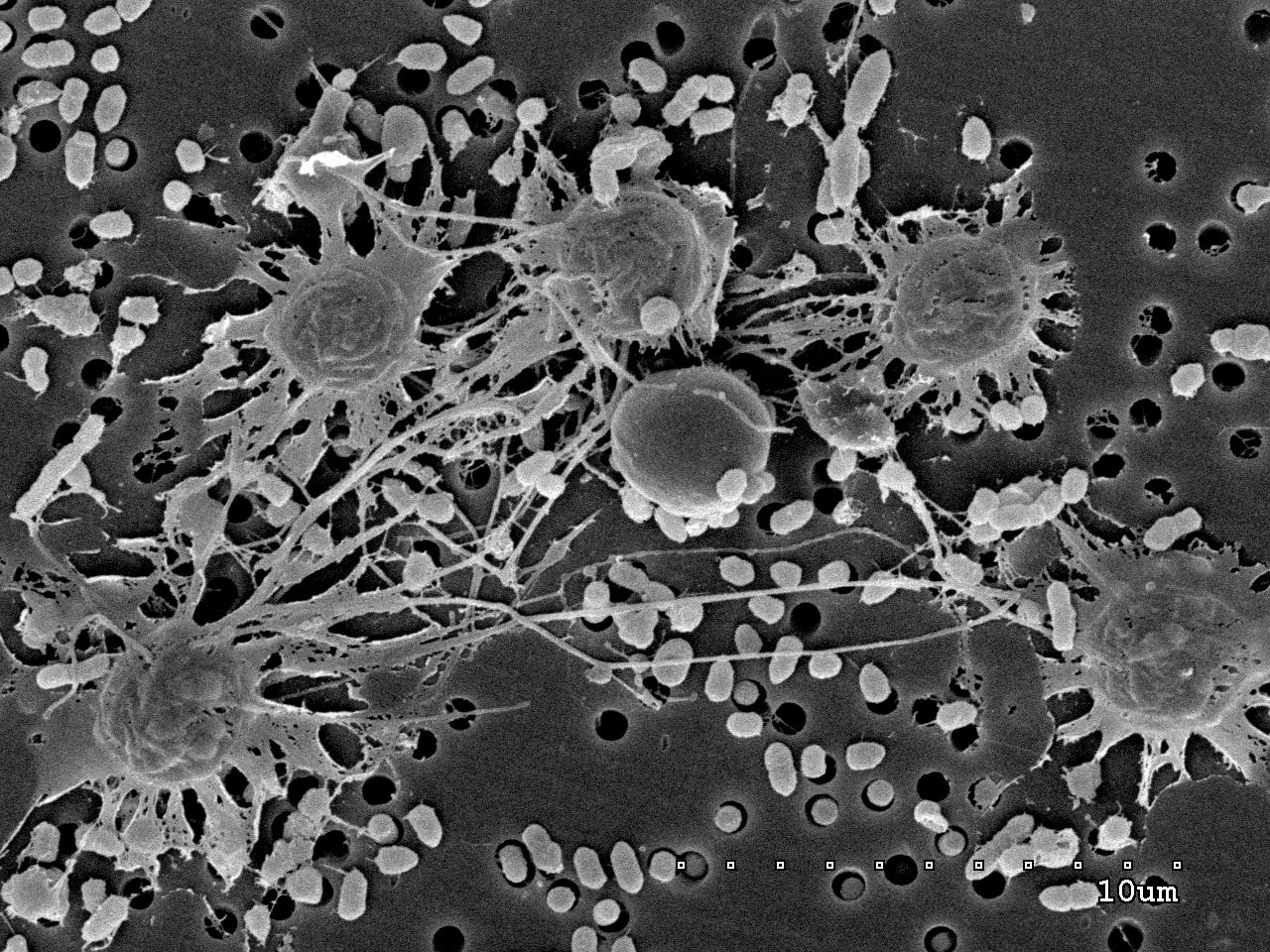
Parvularia atlantis cells extending their filopodia.

Plural filopodia. Referring to pseudopodia that are thin and thread-like. Contrast: lobopodia.
filose
The condition of producing filopodia. Cercozoan and nucleariid amoebae are primarily filose. Contrast: lobose.
flagellate
Single-celled eukaryote bearing at least one flagellum.
flagellum
Plural flagella. Motile appendage present in flagellates and some prokaryotes. In the context of eukaryotes, it is synonymous with undulipodium, which excludes prokaryotic flagella.
fruiting
The process of forming a fruiting body, a "fungus-like" reproductive structure that raises spores (or a sporangium) above the substrate for dispersal during the life cycle of slime molds. They can either be sorocarps, when formed through the aggregation of many cells, or sporocarps, when formed through the growth of a single cell.

== G ==
gametangium

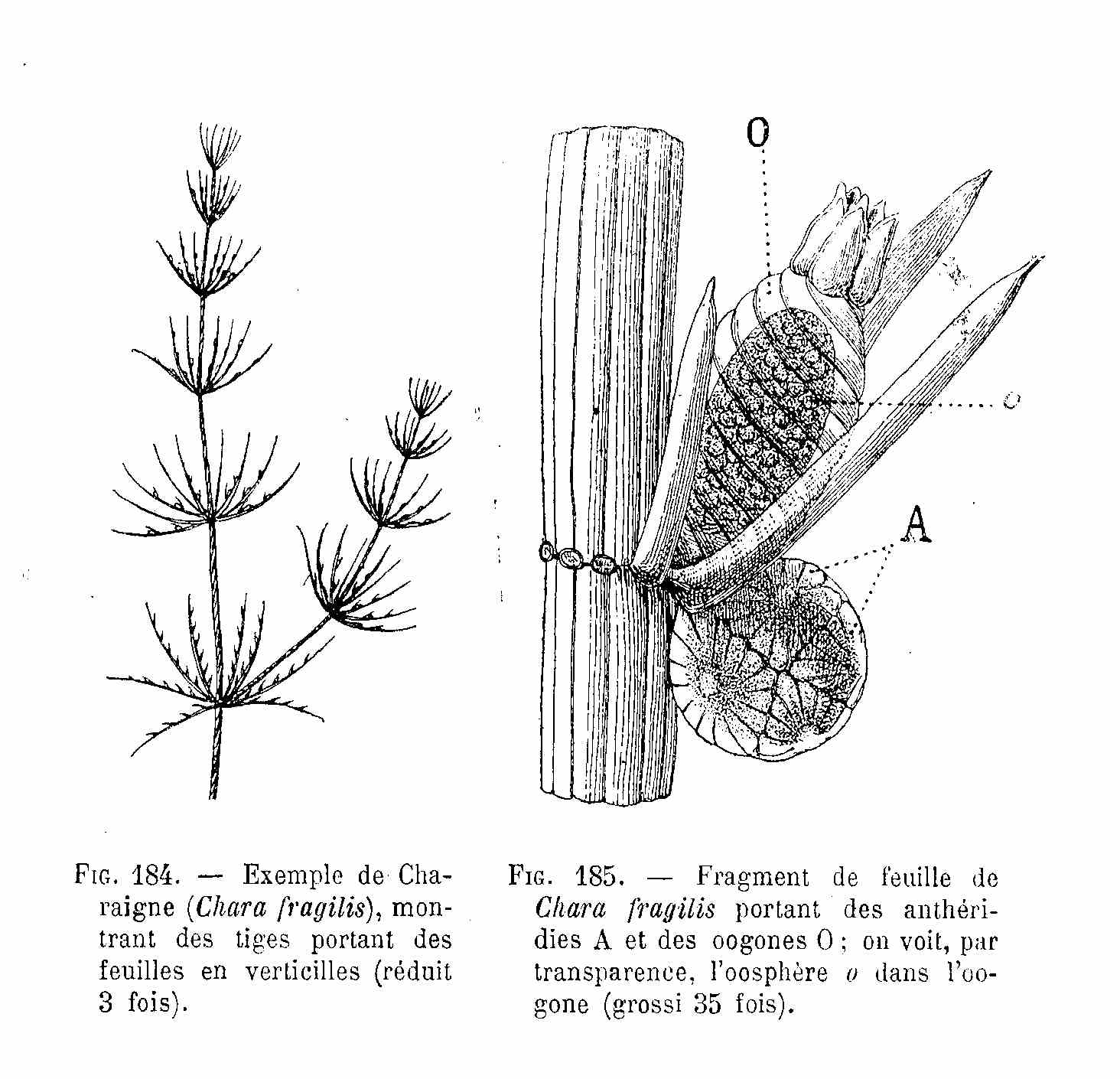
Illustration of gametangia in Chara fragilis: oogonia (O) and antheridia (A).

Plural gametangia. Specialized cell or multicellular structure that produces gametes for sexual reproduction. If reproduction is oogamous, the gametangia are differentiated into female (oogonia) and male (antheridia or spermatogonia).
gamete
Reproductive cell that fuses with another gamete to produce a zygote.
gamogony
Phase in the life cycle of apicomplexans where macrogametocytes and microgametocytes (the two sexes of gamonts) produce macrogametes and microgametes, respectively. In coccidians and haemosporidians, these gamonts derive from merozoites; in the remaining apicomplexans, they are produced by sporozoites directly. Haemogregarines and gregarines are isogamous, meaning gamonts and gametes of each sex are similar.
gamont
Life phase formed through the meiosis of vegetative cells, which in turn undergoes mitosis to produce gametes. Contrast: agamont.
gliding
In flagellates, movement that is closely associated to the surface, as opposed to swimming; flagellates usually glide on either the flagella or the cell body.
gymnamoeba
Plural gymnamoebae. Any amoeba that is naked and develops lobopodia.

== H ==
haemosporidian
Any member of Haemosporidia, one of the two groups of hematozoans within the apicomplexans. They compose around 500 species, including the malarial parasites.
haptist
Any member of Haptista, the clade including centrohelids, haptophytes and possibly telonemids.
haptonema
Filiform appendage found between the flagella of haptophytes. It is interpreted as a feeding organelle that helps in catching and transporting prey particles to the cell.
haptophyte

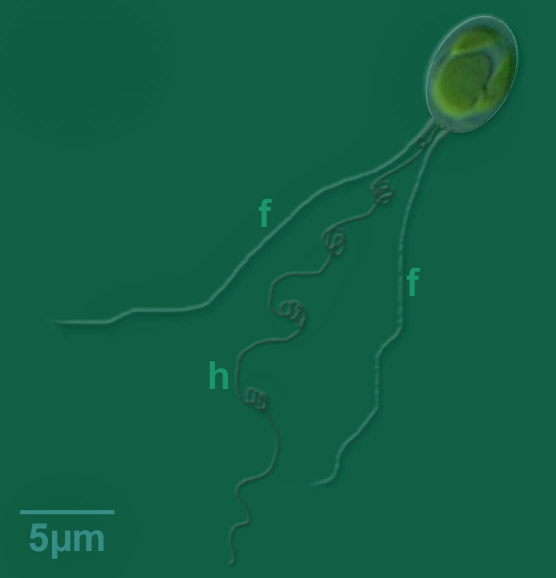
The haptophyte Chrysochromulina displaying a haptonema (h) between its two flagella (f).

Any member of Haptophyta (also known as Haptophytina), a group of around 500 living species of flagellated single-celled algae characterized by the presence of a haptonema.
hematozoan
Any member of Aconoidasida or Hematozoa, one of the major subgroups of apicomplexans. They include the haemosporidians and the piroplasms.
hemiautospore
Synonym of aplanospore.
holomycotan
Any member of Holomycota or Nucletmycea, the opisthokont clade that contains fungi and their closest protist relatives, nucleariids; excludes animals and their closest relatives, collectively known as holozoans. The clade was first described as Nucletmycea, but Holomycota became a more popular name.
holozoan
Any member of Holozoa, one of the two opisthokont clades, containing animals and their closest protist relatives; excludes fungi and their closest relatives, collectively known as holomycotans.
hydrogenosome
Specialized organelle evolved from a mitochondrion, present in many anaerobic protists. Like mitochondria, hydrogenosomes produce ATP and are involved in cellular respiration; in some cases, they still retain a genome. They were discovered by Miklós Müller and Donald Lindmark in 1973 in the trichomonad genus Tritrichomonas.

== I ==
idiosomes
Siliceous particles secreted by certain protists, mainly diatoms and testate amoebae, to construct their shells.
incunabulum
Plural incunabula. Elements added to the wall of a diatom auxospore before its expansion; they may include circular or elliptical scales, or narrow strips of silica.
infusoria
Also infusion animals. Organisms capable of producing desiccation-resistant cysts (including some animals, like rotifers) which can be reactivated with an infusion of water. Coined by Martin Frobenius Ledermüller in the 18th century, it was later adopted as a zoological taxon by Jean Baptiste Lamarck. Since the acceptance of the cell theory until late in the 20th century, it was used exclusively as a synonym for ciliates.
isogamous
The condition of performing the type of sexual reproduction known as anisogamy. Contrast: anisogamous.
isogamy
Type of sexual reproduction where the gametes have the same sizes and morphology. Contrast: anisogamy.

== K ==
karyogamy
Fusion of nuclei between two cells; the final event of the fertilization stage, resulting in the zygote nucleus.
karyomastigont
Physical association between the cell nucleus and the flagellar apparatus.
katablepharid
Also kathablepharid. A member of a group of phagotrophic flagellates closely related to cryptomonads. Their ejectisomes are composed of a single coiled ribbon, or "scroll", unlike the cryptomonads which have two scrolls per ejectisome.

== L ==
lobopodium

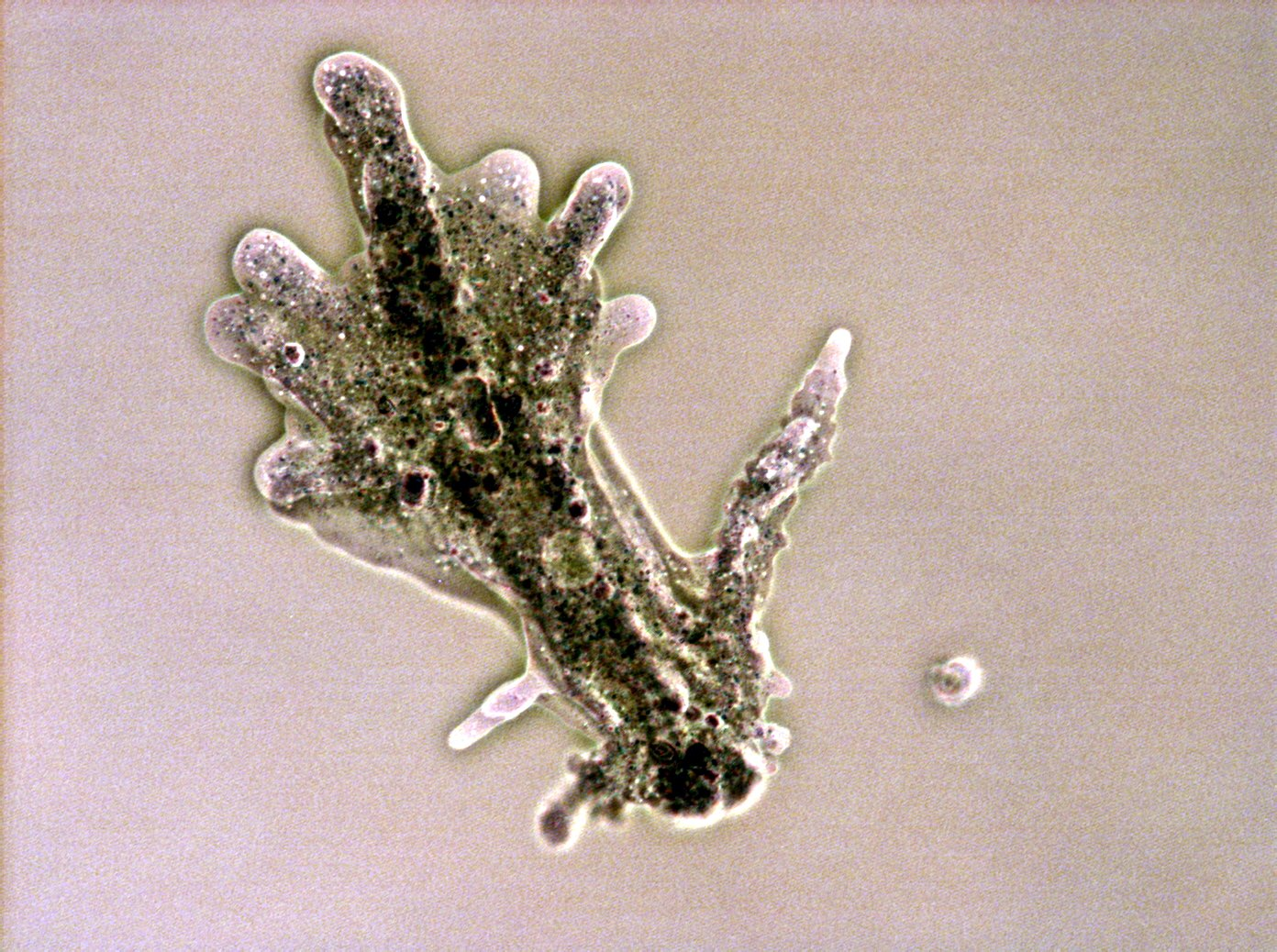
Amoeba proteus extending lobopodia.

Plural lobopodia. Referring to pseudopodia that are round and blunt-ended. Contrast: filopodia.
lobose
The condition of producing lobopodia. Heterolobosean and tubulinean amoebae are primarily lobose. Contrast: filose.
lower fungus
Refers to any fungus that develops a flagellate stage in its life cycle. This includes aphelids, rozellids, microsporidians and chytrids. Although commonly regarded as fungi, they were traditionally studied as protists to some degree.

== M ==
macrogamete
Female gametes produced by gamonts in the life cycles of certain protists, e.g., apicomplexans and opalinids. Contrast: microgamete.
macrogametocyte
Also macrogamont. In apicomplexan life cycles, the male gamont born from merozoites; produces macrogametes. Contrast: microgametocyte.
malaria
Disease caused by haemosporidian species (e.g., Plasmodium falciparum), spread by mosquitoes as vectors. Human malaria is one of the major serious diseases affecting humans, described more than 5,000 years ago and causing about half a million deaths annually.
mantamonad
Any member of Mantamonadida, an order of heterotrophic gliding biflagellates.
mastigophore
Usually synonym of flagellate; in apusomonads, it is the anatomical region that contains both the proboscis and the flagellar apparatus.
mastigote
Synonym of flagellate.
mesokaryote
An organism with closed mitosis, absence of histones, and permanently condensed chromatin. The term was coined in 1965 by John David Dodge, who proposed that organisms with these characteristics represented an intermediate step in evolution between prokaryotes and "true" eukaryotes. Thus, according to this short-lived hypothesis, organisms like dinoflagellates had evolved earlier than the remaining eukaryotes.
meront
Stage in the life cycle of haemosporidians and coccidians derived from the differentiation of the sporozoite after penetrating a host cell. Meronts asexually reproduce into merozoites, a phase known as merogony; eventually, they differentiate into macrogametocytes and microgametocytes instead.
merogony
Also merogonial division. Phase in the life cycle of haemosporidians and coccidians where the meront goes through internal budding for asexual proliferation. The meronts bud into two or more daughter cells by cryptomitosis, and these cells develop into merozoites, which infect cells and differentiate again into meronts. Eventually, the last generation of meronts differentiate into macrogametocytes and microgametocytes instead, initiating the gamogony phase.
merozoite
Stage in the life cycle of haemosporidians and coccidians produced by the meronts during merogony. The merozoites continue spreading the infection to other cells and becoming new meronts.
microgamete
Male gametes produced by gamonts in the life cycles of certain protists, e.g., apicomplexans and opalinids. Contrast: macrogamete.
microgametocyte
Also microgamont. In apicomplexan life cycles, the male gamont born from merozoites; produces microgametes. Contrast: macrogametocyte.
microneme
Specialized thin secretory organelle, part of the apical complex of apicomplexans.
mitochondrion
Plural mitochondria. Specialized organelle characteristic of eukaryotes, obtained through endosymbiosis with an alphaproteobacterium. It has a variety of functions, primarily biosynthesis, cellular respiration and cell signaling, and contains its own mitochondrial genome. In some lineages, primarily anaerobic protists, it has been lost or degraded into a different organelle (i.e., mitochondrion-related organelle).
mitochondrion-like organelle
Abbreviated MLO. Also mitochondrion-related organelle, abbreviated MRO. Term for organelles evolved from metabolically reduced mitochondria, namely hydrogenosomes and mitosomes.
mitosome
Organelle evolved from mitochondria that does not produce ATP or hydrogen, and lacks most metabolic pathways associated with mitochondria or hydrogenosomes.
monad
Also -monas. Term used for nomenclatural purposes, mainly in reference to flagellates (see monadoid). Its initial use had a metaphysical meaning, to designate the indivisible and permanent smallest units of life, considered to be the elements and sources of all creatures. With the advent of optical microscopy and direct observation of unicellular life, the term was adapted by natural scientists during the 18-19th centuries to describe single-celled flagellates.
monadoid
Also monadal. Single-celled flagellated stage of some algae, as opposed to non-flagellated coccoid algae.
multinucleate
Refers to cells that have more than one nucleus.
muroplast
Historical term for chloroplasts found in glaucophytes, previously known as cyanelles.

== N ==
naked
Refers to amoebae that lack any cell covering (e.g., Amoeba proteus), as opposed to testate or scaled amoebae.
nebulid
Any member of Nebulidia, one of the two phyla of provorans. Their predatory lifestyle consists of swallowing prey cells whole.

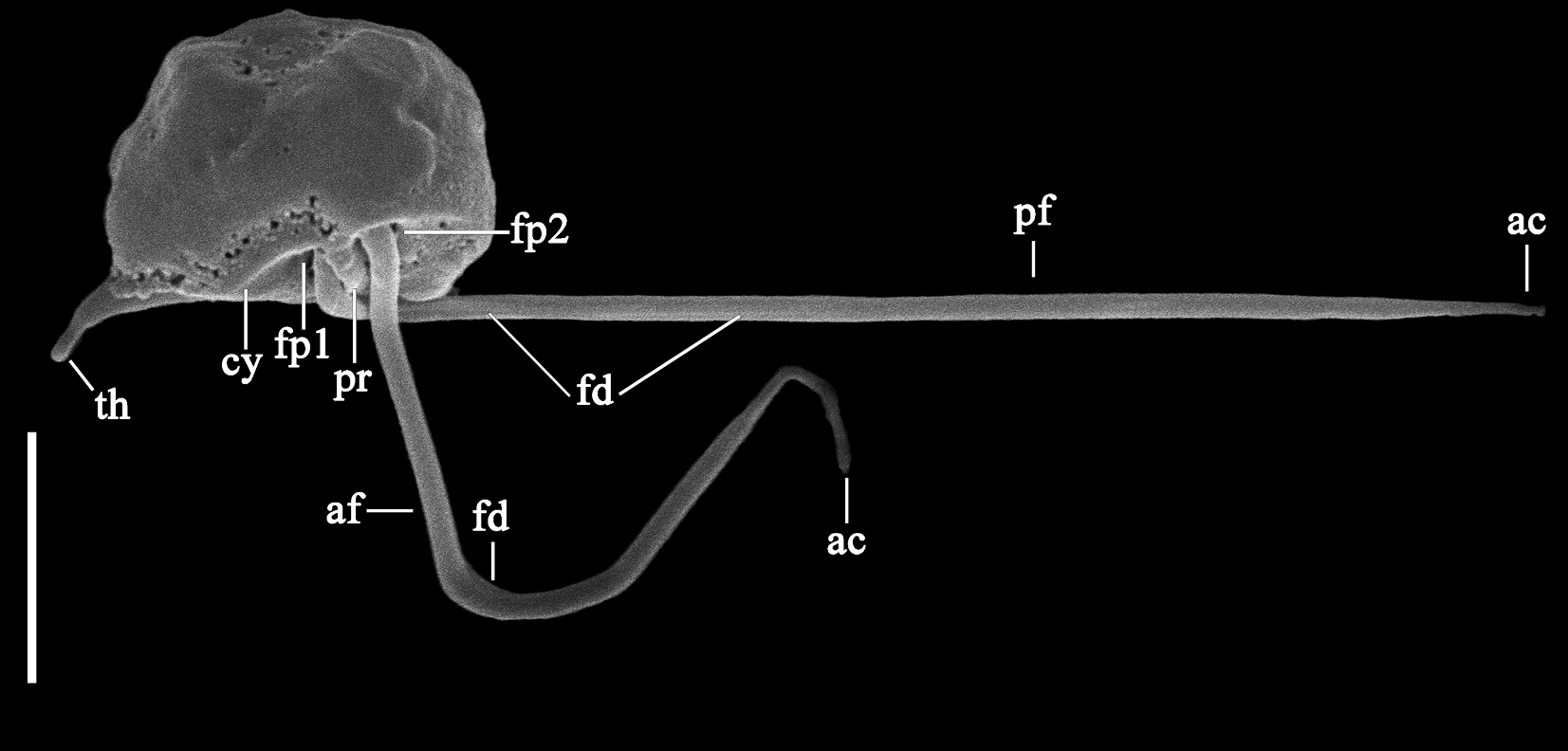
Scanning electron micrograph of the nibblerid Nibbleromonas piranha showing its two flagella (af, pf) and 'thorn' (th)

nibblerid
Any member of Nibbleridia, one of the two phyla of provorans. Their predatory lifestyle consists of 'nibbling' on their prey using a jaw-like feeding apparatus.
nucleariid
Any member of Nucleariidae, a family of around 50 species of filose discicristate amoebae that compose the closest relatives of fungi. Taxonomically, they belong to the monotypic order Rotosphaerida; consequently, they are sometimes called rotosphaerids. Some nucleariids are naked, while others are covered in scales. Among nucleariids is one species capable of aggregative multicellilarity, Fonticula alba.
nucletmycean
Synonym of holomycotan.

== O ==
obazoan
Any member of the clade Obazoa, a group that includes opisthokonts, apusomonads and breviates. Together with amoebozoans, they compose the clade Amorphea.
oocyst
Stage in the life cycle of apicomplexans developed from the zygote and responsible for the production of sporocysts, which in turn produce sporozoites. This process known as sporogony. In some species, each oocyst only produces one sporocyst, making them equivalent.
oogamous
The condition of performing the type of sexual reproduction known as oogamy.
oogamy
Type of anisogamy where the female gamete is a large, non-motile egg cell and the male gamete is a small, motile, flagellated cell (zoospore or sperm).
oogonium
Plural oogonia. Female gametangium; produces an egg cell, the female gamete. It may comprise a single cell (as in diatoms and xanthophytes) or a multicellular organ (as in stoneworts and oomycetes).
opisthokont
Any member of Opisthokonta, the clade that contains animals and fungi, as well as their closest protist relatives. It is divided in two branches: Holozoa and Holomycota, each housing animals and fungi, respectively. They evolved from a phagotrophic flagellate ancestor with a single posterior flagellum, in contrast to their closest relatives, the biflagellate apusomonads and breviates.

== P ==
perizonium
Plural perizonia. Silica element added to the wall of a diatom auxospore during its expansion; consist of several bands formed sequentially.
phytoflagellate
Photosynthetic flagellate, as opposed to zooflagellate.
piroplasm
Any member of Piroplasmida, one of the two groups of hematozoans within the apicomplexans. Piroplasms include around 200 species of parasites of vertebrates that use ticks as vectors.
planomonad
Synonym of ancyromonad.
plasmogamy
Fusion of cytoplasms between more than one cell.
plastid
General term for both chloroplasts and non-photosynthetic organelles derived from them (e.g., apicoplast).
posterior
In single-celled organisms, refers to the region of the cell opposite to the direction of movement. Contrast: anterior.
prasinodermophyte
Informal term for any member of the group Prasinodermophyta, a group of green plants classified by at least 2 studies based on 18S rRNA and plastid genes as a basal Chlorophyta clade and by multiple genetic studies published after 2021 as a basal Viridiplantae clade.
prasinophyte
Obsolete term for any green plant outside UTC clade, Pedinophyceae, Chlorokybophyceae, Klebsormidiophyceae and Phragmoplastophyta.
pre-conoid
Also pre-conoidal rings. Microtubule rings at the anterior end of apicomplexan and chrompodellid cells, as part of their apical complex.
proboscis
In apusomonads, a highly mobile sleeve-like extension of folded membrane in the anterior region, which encloses the anterior flagellum; it is the primary characteristic of those organisms.
protist
Also protoctist. Any eukaryote that is not an animal (i.e., does not develop from a blastula), land plant (does not have embryonic stages) or higher fungus (does not have a flagellate stage in their life cycles). Lower fungi are also commonly excluded from protists. The term is sometimes associated with any single-celled eukaryote instead, to the exclusion of macroalgae. It was coined by Ernst Haeckel in 1866 as the taxon Protista, but under his definition it included prokaryotes and excluded ciliates. John Hogg introduced the taxon Protoctista in 1861 as a separate kingdom from those of animals, plants, and fungi. Under Robert H. Whittaker's 1959 concept of five kingdoms, the modern usage of protists as separate from prokaryotes and other eukaryotes was developed.
prometheid
A member of the proposed clade Promethea formed by provorans, hemimastigotes and Meteora sporadica. Equivalent in composition to Disparia.
protosteloid

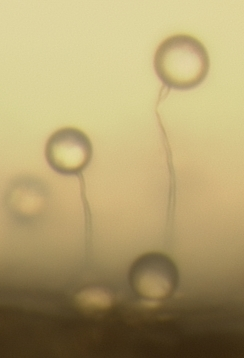
Protosteloid development in Protostelium mycophaga

Refers to a type of sorocarp fruiting consisting of a thin acellular stalk that supports a lump of one or more spores; characteristic of several different amoebozoans.
protozoa
Singular protozoon. Exclusively refers to obligatory heterotrophic protists, as opposed to algae.
protozoic
Pertaining to or originating from protozoa.
provoran
Any member of Provora, a small clade of single-celled biflagellate predators that are particularly fast swimmers. They are divided into two phyla: nebulids and nibblerids.
pseudopodium
Plural pseudopodia. Also pseudopod, with plural pseudopods. Extension of the cytoplasm produced in amoeboid organisms; may be extended or retracted for motility or to engulf food particles.
pseudo-conoid
An incomplete conoid found in the closest relatives of apicomplexans, chrompodellids, composed of micronemes, an incomplete ring of subpellicular microtubules (pre-conoid), and elongated organelles reminiscent of rhoptries.

== R ==
reticulopodium
Plural reticulopodia. Referring to pseudopodia that are more or less thin and branching; some can anastomose into networks of cytoplasm.
reticulose
The condition of producing reticulopodia. Granofilosean and variosean amoebae are primarily reticulose.
red alga
Also rhodophyte. Any member of Rhodophyta, a phylum of photosynthetic eukaryotes within the Archaeplastida containing more than 7,100 species. They are characterized by a lack of flagella and centrioles in all their life stages. They have evolved very diverse morphologies, from single cells to macroscopic thalli. Some red algae have complex life cycles of up to three generations.
rhoptry
Specialized club-shaped secretory organelle, part of the apical complex of apicomplexans.
rigifilid
Any member of Rigifilida, an order of two species of phagotrophic filose amoebae.
rostrum
A distinct anterior region of the cell of some flagellates; characteristic of ancyromonads.
rotosphaerid
Synonym of nucleariid. Due to the complicated taxonomic history of nucleariids, the first ones to be described were the naked, scale-less species under the family Nucleariidae; scale-bearing species (e.g., Pompholyxophrys) were described separately as Rotosphaerida by Heinrich Rainer in 1968. Later studies revealed that both belonged to the same group, and they are collectively known as nucleariids.

== S ==
SAR
Also Sar. Eukaryotic supergroup that comprises stramenopiles, alveolates and rhizarians.
schizogony
Synonym of merogony.
schizont
Synonym of meront.
skidding
A form of swimming in some flagellates where the posterior flagellum is loosely in contact with the substrate.
slime mold
Also slime mould. Informal (polyphyletic) category used to designate amoeboid organisms that, at some point in their life cycle, develop into a spore-bearing dispersal structure known as a fruting body.
sorocarp
A type of fruiting body formed through the aggregation of numerous cells, as opposed to a sporocarp.
sperm
Male gametes which fuse with an egg cell to form a zygote; produced in a spermatogonium.
spermatogonium
In the context of diatoms, specialized cell that undergoes a series of divisions to form sperm cells within itself; equivalent to the antheridium in other protists.
spicule
A rod-like structure, usually siliceous or calcareous, deposited on the cell surface or distributed through the peripheral cytoplasm of various protists, such as radiolarians, heliozoans, some dinoflagellates, and in the spicular basket of choanoflagellates. Spicules exist with diverse shapes and ornamentation; their geometry is often a taxonomic characteristic.
sporangium
Specialized enclosure where spores are developed.
spore
General term for specialized cells used for asexual dispersion or sexual reproduction; usually implies a degree of resistance to adverse conditions.
sporocarp
A type of fruiting body that is formed from a single cell, as opposed to a sorocarp.
sporocyst
Stage in the life cycle of apicomplexans developed from the oocyst and responsible for the production of sporozoites. This process known as sporogony.
sporogony
Phase in the life cycle of apicomplexans where the zygote forms a protective wall around itself and differentiates into an oocyst, in which there are sporocysts that generate sporozoites, the infectious stage.
sporozoite
The most characteristic and well-studied stage in the life cycle of apicomplexans. It is developed during sporogony within sporocysts. Sporozoites compose the first infectious stage, as they penetrate host cells with their apical complex. Afterwards, they differentiate into micro- and macrogametocytes or, in the case of coccidians and haemosporidians, differentiate into meronts and begin the phase of merogony.
swimming
In flagellates, movement that occurs free in the water column, not associated to surfaces as in gliding.
syngamy
Synonym of fertilization.

== T ==
tachyzoite
Also tachyzoic merozoite. A merozoite characterized by rapid growth and replication, present in an early coccidial infection. Contrast: bradyzoite.
telonemid
Any member of Telonemia, a clade of Diaphoretickes.
test

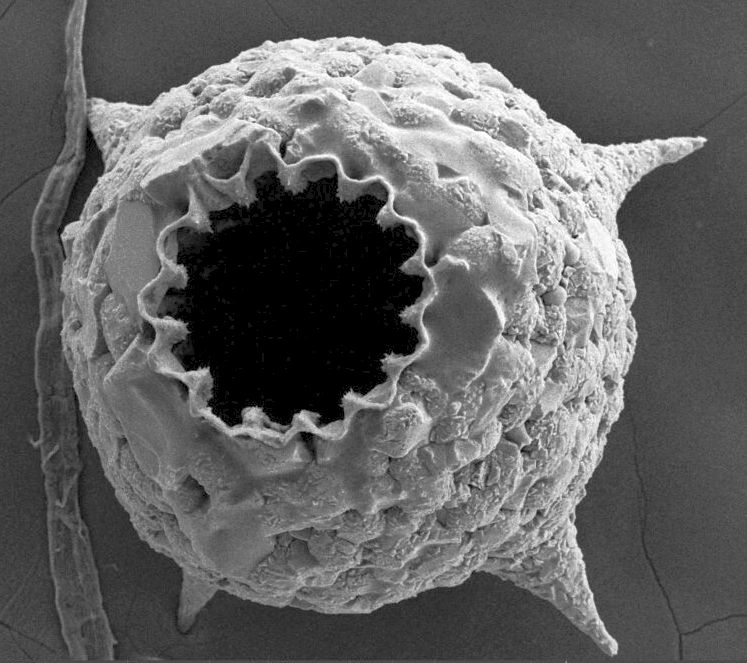
Scanning electron micrograph of a Netzelia corona test

Hard, shell-like cell coverings characteristic of testate amoebae, composed of organic and/or inorganic material, either secreted by the cells themselves or recycled from other organisms.
testate
Refers to amoebae that are covered in a test.
TSAR
A proposed supergroup composed of Telonemia and SAR.

== U ==
undulipodium
Plural undulipodia. Motile appendage exclusive to eukaryotic cells. The term was popularized by Lynn Margulis to differentiate it from prokaryotic flagella; it is synonymous with flagella and cilia in the context of protists.
unicell
Single-celled organism; the nominal counterpart of the adjective unicellular.
uniflagellate
Flagellate with only one flagellum.
unikont
Flagellate with a single flagellum associated to only one basal body. The clade that groups together Amoebozoa and Opisthokonta was initially called Unikonta, due to a hypothesis where their common ancestor was a unikont; this was later refuted, and the clade name was changed to Amorphea.

== V ==
vegetative
Refers to the life stage that undergoes asexual reproduction or growth by mitosis; frequently the most dominant life stage in the environment.
ventral groove
Groove used for feeding, found in the ventral side of the cell of many flagellates; characteristic of excavates.

== Z ==
zooflagellate
Also zoomastigophore. Heterotrophic flagellate, as opposed to phytoflagellate.
zoosporangium
Sporangium that produces zoospores.
zoospore
Motile flagellated spore. Contrary: aplanospore.
zygote
Cell produced by the fusion of two gametes, a process known as syngamy.

== See also ==
- Glossary of biology
- Glossary of botany
- Glossary of mycology
