= Rabdiophrys =

Scientific classification
- Domain: Eukaryota
- (unranked): Holomycota
- Class: Cristidiscoidea
- Order: Nucleariida
- Family: Pompholyxophryidae
- Genus: Rabdiophrys Rainer, 1968

Genus of single-celled organisms

Rabdiophrys is a genus of rotosphaerid amoebae erected by Heinrich Rainer in 1968. Members of the genus are unicellular, non-flagellated, heterotrophic protists with thin filopodia and a covering of ornamented siliceous scales. Because they are spherical and bear radiating filose pseudopodia, they have historically been mistaken for centrohelid heliozoans, although they lack the central axoplast that defines true centrohelids.

== Description ==
Cells of Rabdiophrys are typically 25–40 µm in diameter and are enveloped by two distinct types of hollow siliceous scales: flat plate-scales and elongate spine-scales. The plate-scales, 1.5–5.5 µm across, consist of two layers fused at the periphery and held together elsewhere by intercalary material; the proximal layer is finely perforated, while the distal layer bears one or more larger pores. Spine-scales are highly variable in length (from less than 1 µm to over 12 µm), each composed of a basal plate and a hollow shaft terminating in species-specific apical ornamentation. The cytoplasm contains many granules and conspicuous food vacuoles, and prey is captured by very thin filopodia. Unlike centrohelid heliozoans, rotosphaerids such as Rabdiophrys also lack extrusomes and have flattened mitochondrial cristae. The presence of both plate- and spine-scales distinguishes Rabdiophrys from the related genus Pinaciophora, whose members produce only plate-scales.

== Taxonomy ==
Rainer originally placed Rabdiophrys alongside Lithocolla, Pinaciocystis, Pinaciophora and Pompholyxophrys in the order Rotosphaerida, at the time considered a subgroup of the Heliozoa. The nomenclature of the group later became confused after Thomsen (1978) described eight new species bearing both plate- and spine-scales under Pinaciophora, apparently unaware that Rainer had already established Rabdiophrys for forms with spine-scales. Roijackers and Siemensma (1988) resolved the issue by treating the production of spine-scales as a genus-level character and transferring all such species into Rabdiophrys.

Because molecular sequence data are not available for any species of Rabdiophrys (as of 2019), its placement rests entirely on morphology. Most current authorities classify the genus within Nucleariida in the family Pompholyxophryidae, a position inferred from the placement of the closely related sequenced genera Pompholyxophrys and Lithocolla. Under this view Rabdiophrys belongs to Holomycota, the broader clade containing fungi and their unicellular relatives. Cavalier-Smith and Chao have instead placed the genus among the Rhizaria.

== Species and distribution ==
The type species is Rabdiophrys anulifera Rainer, 1968, a freshwater form 27–35 µm in diameter that has been reported from Germany, the Netherlands and Canada. Following the transfer of spine-scaled Pinaciophora species by Roijackers and Siemensma, the genus contained 14 species, and the National Institute for Environmental Studies (Japan) catalogues 19 species in total. Other described forms include R. monopora, R. pinea, and R. turrisfenestrata, the last described in 1991 from Lake Moeraki on the South Island of New Zealand on the basis of scales recovered by electron microscopy.

Rabdiophrys has a cosmopolitan distribution in both freshwater and marine habitats, and forms close to R. anulifera have been recorded as far north as the Arctic waters of Russia.

== Fossil record ==
Although members of the genus produce silica scales that should in principle preserve well, Rabdiophrys was unknown from the fossil record until 2022, when Siver and Skogstad described abundant remains of a new species, R. giraffensis, from the Eocene Giraffe Pipe kimberlite locality in the Northwest Territories of northern Canada. Its plate- and spine-scales were similar in morphology, but significantly larger than those of the closest modern species R. monopora and R. anulifera, indicating that scale morphology in the genus has been broadly stable since the Eocene. The host waterbody is interpreted as a moderately deep, circumneutral pond with moderate concentrations of nutrients and dissolved humic material, situated near the Arctic Circle at the time of deposition.
