= Nuclearia pattersoni =

Scientific classification
- Domain: Eukaryota
- Supergroup: Amorphea
- Clade: Obazoa
- Clade: Opisthokonta
- Clade: Holomycota
- Order: Rotosphaerida
- Family: Nucleariidae
- Genus: Nuclearia
- Species: N. pattersoni

Binomial name
- Nuclearia pattersoni Dyková, Veverková, Fiala, Macháčková, and Pecková, 2003

Species of amoeba

Nuclearia pattersoni is a species of heterotrophic amoeba in the clade Opisthokonta. It can be found in the gills of roach fish (Rutilus rutilus).
