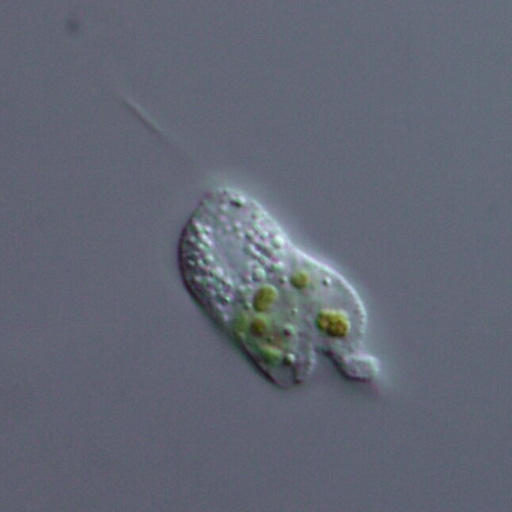
- Cercomonas sp.

Scientific classification
- Domain: Eukaryota
- Clade: Sar
- Clade: Rhizaria
- Phylum: Cercozoa
- Subphylum: Filosa
- Infraphylum: Monadofilosa
- Order: Cercomonadida; Poche, 1913 emend. Cavalier-Smith, 2012

Genera
- Cavernomonadidae; Cavernomonas; Cercomonadidae; Cercomonas; Eocercomonas; Filomonas; Neocercomonas

Synonyms
- Cercobodonidae Hollande 1942

= Cercomonad =

Cercomonads

Order of single-celled organisms

Cercomonads are small amoeboflagellates, widespread in aqueous habitats and common in soils.

== Characteristics ==
The cells are generally around 10 μm in length, without any shell or covering. They produce filose pseudopods to capture bacteria, but do not use them for locomotion, which usually takes place by gliding along surfaces.

Most members have two flagella, one directed forward and one trailing under the cell, inserted at right angles near its anterior. The nucleus is connected to the flagellar bases and accompanied by a characteristic paranuclear body.

Representation of a cercomonad: 1. Anterior flagellum; 2. Microtubular bands; 3. Fibrillar rootlet; 4. Golgi apparatus; modifies proteins and sends them out of the cell; 5. Microtubule cone; 6. Nucleus; 7. Nucleolus; 8. Endoplasmic reticulum, the transport network for molecules going to specific parts of the cell; 9. Extrusome; 10. Contractile vacuole, regulates the quantity of water inside a cell; 11. Dense granule; 12. Mitochondrion, creates ATP (energy) for the cell, tubular cristae; 13. Food vacuole; 14. Prey (bacteria); 15. Lysosome, holds enzymes; 16. Posterior flagellum

== Classification ==
Genetic studies place the cercomonads among the Cercozoa, a diverse group of amoeboid and flagellate protozoans. They are divided into two families.

- The Heteromitidae tend to be relatively rigid, and produce only temporary pseudopods.
- The Cercomonadidae are more plastic, and when food supplies are plentiful may become amoeboid and even multinucleate.

The classification of genera and species continues to undergo revision. Some genera have been merged, like Cercomonas and Cercobodo. Others like Helkesimastix, Sainouron and Cholamonas have been moved to Helkesida, while the rest of the family Heteromitidae has been moved to Glissomonadida.

- Cavernomonas Vickerman 2009
- Cercomonas Dujardin 1841 emend. Karpov et al. 2006 non emend. Ekelund et al. 2004 [Cercobodo Krassilstschick 1886; Cercomastix Lemmermann 1913; Dimastigamoeba Blochmann 1894; ?Mukdeniamonas Skwortzov 1960; ?Changia Skwortzov 1960 non Sun 1924; ?Reptomonas Kent 1880; Dimorpha Klebs 1892 non Gruber 1882]
- Eocercomonas Karpov et al. 2006
- Filomonas Cavalier-Smith & Karpov 2012
- Neocercomonas Ekelund, Daugbjerg & Fredslund 2004
