= Verrucomonas =

Scientific classification
- Domain: Eukaryota
- Supergroup: Rhizaria
- Phylum: Cercozoa
- Subphylum: Filosa
- Class: Thecofilosea
- Order: Ventricleftida
- Family: Verrucomonadidae; Cavalier-Smith in Cavalier-Smith, Chao & Lewis 2018
- Genus: Verrucomonas; Chantangsi & Leander 2010

Type species
- Verrucomonas bifida Chantangsi & Leander 2010

Species
- V. bifida; V. longifila

Genus of thecate cercozoans

Verrucomonas is a genus of marine gliding biflagellates. It belongs to its own family Verrucomonadidae in the order Ventricleftida and contains two species. Its name comes from "verruca" meaning wart and "monas" meaning unit.

== Characteristics ==
Verrucomonas is a genus of gliding biflagellates that lives in marine interstitial sand habitat. Its dorsoventrally flattened cells have a rough surface. Colored warts ranging from yellowish to red, brownish, and golden are found on the cell surface. The only nucleus is located at the anterior end of the cell. Cytoplasm is colorless. Theca, ventral furrow, filopodia and extrusomes are present. Locomotion by gliding. Anterior and posterior notches are sometimes seen.

== Taxonomy ==
The cercozoan genus Verrucomonas was described in 2010 with two species. It was assigned to the thecofilosean order Tectofilosida. Its name comes from "verruca" meaning wart and "monas" meaning unit. The name reflects that members within this genus have colored warts on the cell surface. In 2011, it was assigned to a new thecofilosean order known as Ventricleftida. In 2018, it was assigned to its own family Verrucomonadidae.

== Phylogeny ==
A phylogenetic analysis in 2026:

- Ventricleftida
  - - Ventrifissuridae
    - eVentri
  - - Verrucomonadidae
      - V. bifida
      - V. longifila
    - Novel Clade A
