= Notch =

Notch may refer to:

- Notch (engineering), an indentation or slit in a material
- Nock (arrow), notch in the rearmost end of an arrow
- NOTCH (magazine), an Indian entertainment and lifestyle magazine
- Notch, Missouri, a community in the United States
- Notch signalling pathway, a cell signalling system present in most multicellular organisms
- Notch proteins, a family of transmembrane proteins
- Notch filter, a band-stop filter with a narrow stopband
- Notch test, also known as Charpy impact test
- Lion Notch, a male lion featured in the nature documentary series Big Cat Diary
- Notch display, an electronic screen with a cutout in it
- A type of col in geomorphology

== People ==
- Markus Persson (born 1979), a Swedish video game designer known by his online alias "Notch"
- Notch (musician) (born 1973), a hip hop, R&B, reggae, dancehall and reggaeton artist

== See also ==
- Top Notch (disambiguation)
- Niche (disambiguation)
- Nutch, an open-source search engine
