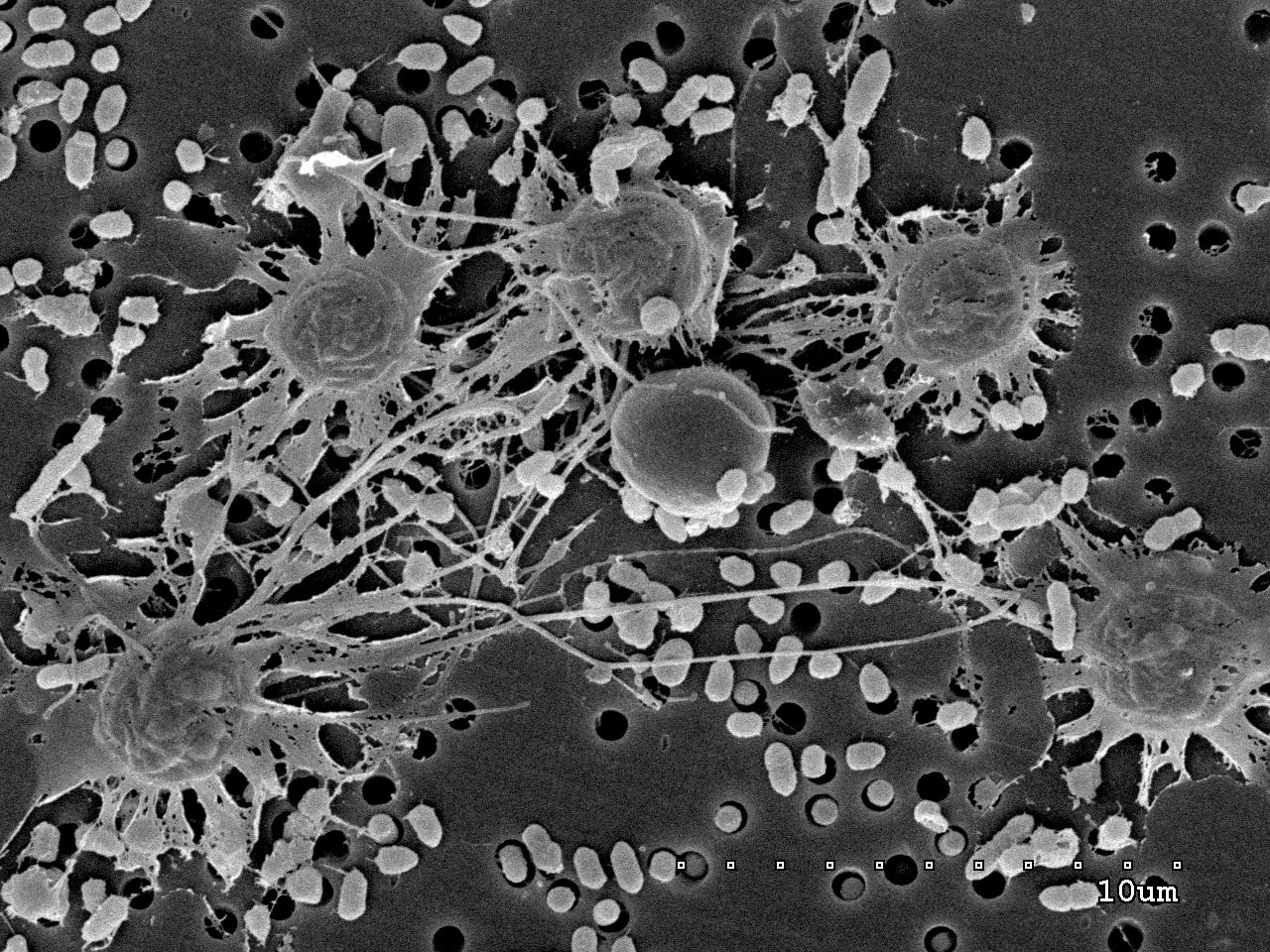
- Amoebal and cystic cells of Parvularia atlantis

Scientific classification
- Domain: Eukaryota
- Class: Cristidiscoidea
- Order: Nucleariida
- Genus: Parvularia
- Species: P. atlantis

Binomial name
- Parvularia atlantis López-Escardó & Torruella 2017

= Parvularia =

Genus of amoebae

Parvularia atlantis is a filopodiated amoeba which was isolated from a lake in Atlanta and deposited in the American Type Culture Collection (ATCC) under the name Nuclearia sp. ATCC 50694 on 1997 by TK Sawyer. It was classified under the genus Nuclearia and morphologically resembles to Nuclearia species, although it is smaller (the diameter of the cell body measures approximately 4 μm compared to Nuclearia species, which range between 9-60 μm). Later it was determined that it phylogenetically belongs to a new nucleariid lineage, the genus Parvularia, distantly related to Nuclearia and Fonticula genera – the other two previously described nucleariid genera.

Thus, Parvularia atlantis emerged as a new genus and a new species at the onset of Holomycota, which contain a set of phylogenetic and morphological characteristics that make this species unique. P. atlantis feeds on rod-shaped bacteria and present uni- or bi- nucleated cells. During its life cycle, P. atlantis can form spherical cystic cells which contain an embedded extracellular coat. P. atlantis is not the first case in which a filopodiated amoeba was misassigned to the Nuclearia genera. The amoeba Capsaspora owczarzaki was previously described as well as a Nuclearia, until phylogenetic approaches placed Capsaspora outside Holomycota, within Holozoans.

Its transcriptomic data is already available.
