= Top Notch =

Top Notch may refer to:

- TopNotch, a Dutch record label
- Top-Notch Magazine, an American pulp magazine of adventure fiction that existed between 1910 and 1937
- Top Notch (New York), an elevation in Herkimer County, New York
- Top Notch Peak, a summit in Yellowstone National Park, Wyoming, US
- "Top Notch", a song by American rapper Lil Boosie on the 2009 album Superbad: The Return of Boosie Bad Azz
- "Top Notch", a song by American indie rock band Manchester Orchestra on the 2014 album Cope
- "Top Notch", a 2022 song by City Girls
- a variety of green beans

== See also ==
- Top (disambiguation)
- Notch (disambiguation)
