= Charles M. Super =

American academic

Charles M. Super is a professor of Human Development & Family Sciences at the University of Connecticut. and he has held academic appointments at the Harvard Medical School, the Harvard School of Public Health, and the Pennsylvania State University. He is co-director of the Center for the Study of Culture, Health, and Human Development. He has directed or participated in research projects on early human development and family life in the Netherlands, Kenya, Zambia, Guatemala, Colombia, Haiti, and Bangladesh, as well as the United States. He has won a Distinguished Service Award from the University of Connecticut School of Family Studies Alumni Association.

Super's research interests focus on cultural regulation of human development, particularly biological, cognitive, and emotional development during infancy and childhood; parental and professional ethnotheories of childhood development and behavior; interventions to promote the physical and mental health of children and families; and research methods appropriate for comparative and culturally based research.

He has received research grants from the National Science Foundation, the National Institute of Child Health and Human Development, and State of Connecticut Children's Trust Fund. Super and his wife Sara Harkness were presented with the first Award for Distinguished Contributions to Cultural and Contextual Factors in Child Development from the Society for Research in Child Development.

Super was a staff member for the 1970 White House Conference on Children.

He went to Yale University for his BA (Psychology, 1966) and Harvard University for his PhD (Developmental Psychology, 1972).

== Publications ==
Super's writings have been published in psychological, anthropological, and medical journals.

Like others in his field of study, Super holds that even within a given society, different cognitive characteristics are emphasized from one situation to another and from one subculture to another. These differences extend not just to conceptions of intelligence but to what is considered adaptive or appropriate in a broader sense. Super calls for culturally- and contextually-based models of human development. See Developmental niche.

== Books ==
Super is the author or coauthor of:

- Parents' Cultural Belief Systems: Their Origins, Expressions, and Consequences. Sara Harkness and Charles M. Super, eds. New York: The Guilford Press, 1996.
- Opportunities in Psychology Careers by Charles M. Super, Donald E. Super Ph.D., Blythe Camenson, and Joanne E. Callan Ph.D. (3rd, revised, 2008: ISBN 0071545301) (2001: ISBN 0658010530)
- The Role of Culture in Developmental Disorder by Charles M. Super (1987).

== Recognition ==
Super is a Fellow of the American Psychological Association, the Association for Psychological Science (formerly the American Psychological Society), and the American Anthropological Association.
