= Eocercomonas =

Scientific classification
- Domain: Eukaryota
- Clade: Sar
- Clade: Rhizaria
- Phylum: Cercozoa
- Class: Sarcomonadea
- Order: Cercomonadida
- Family: Cercomonadidae
- Genus: Eocercomonas; Karpov et al. 2006

Type species
- Eocercomonas ramosa Karpov et al. 2006

Species
- Eocercomonas echina Howe & Cavalier-Smith 2009; Eocercomonas exploratorii Brabender et al. 2012; Eocercomonas minuscula Mylnikov & Cavalier-Smith 2009; Eocercomonas minuta Bass, Mylnikov & Cavalier-Smith 2009; Eocercomonas perecta Brabender et al. 2012; Eocercomonas ramosa Karpov et al. 2006; Eocercomonas tribula Howe & Cavalier-Smith 2009; Eocercomonas uvella Bass & Cavalier-Smith 2009

Genus of single-celled organisms

Eocercomonas is a genus of cercozoa.

It is includes the species Eocercomonas ramosa.
