= Niche =

Niche may refer to:

== Science ==
- Developmental niche, a concept for understanding the broader cultural context of child development and growth
- Ecological niche, a term describing the relational position of an organism's species
- Niche (protein structural motif)
- Stem-cell niche, the necessary cellular environment of a stem cell

== Business ==
- Niche market, a focused, targetable portion (subset) of a market sector
  - Niche blogging, a blog focused on a niche market

== Other uses ==
- Bassline (music genre), a type of music related to UK garage also called Niche
  - Niche Nightclub, a nightclub opened up on Sidney Street in Sheffield, before closing in 2005
- Niche genre or microgenre, a segment within a music genre
- Niche (architecture), an exedra or an apse that has been reduced in size
  - A structure of a columbarium for a cremation urn especially in a cemetery
- Niche (company), an Internet search and review service
- Niche (horse), a British Thoroughbred racehorse
- Niche (video game), a 2017 video game
- Niche, a character in the manga Tegami Bachi
- Niche (footballer), Bissau-Guinean footballer
- Network in Canadian History and Environment, a group of Canadian environmental historians
- Nishe, a B-Side from the 2000 single Unintended by English rock band, Muse
