= Neocercomonas =

Scientific classification
- Domain: Eukaryota
- Clade: Sar
- Clade: Rhizaria
- Phylum: Cercozoa
- Subphylum: Filosa
- Order: Cercomonadida
- Family: Cercomonadidae
- Genus: Neocercomonas; Ekelund, Fredslund & Daugbjerg 2004

Type species
- Neocercomonas jutlandica Ekelund, Fredslund & Daugbjerg 2004

Genus of single-celled organisms

Neocercomonas is a protist genus of the order Cercomonadida. It consists of single-celled bacteriophagous organisms that usually live on or nearby terrestrial plants, both above and belowground. Species are biflagellate and may grow up to 60 micrometers long, with a trailing tail-like mass of protoplasm at their posterior end and a pair of roots connecting their posterior flagellum to the cytoskeleton.

== Etymology ==
The genus was named by Ekelund et al. in 2004. The first three letters of the genus name are directly lifted from the Greek neo, meaning 'new', whereas the second part refers to the closely related genus Cercomonas, from which Neocercomonas was originally distinguished when the former was discovered not to be a monophyletic group. Hence, Neocercomonas can be interpreted as 'new Cercomonas'. Higher classifications such as the phylum Cercozoa and the order Cercomonadida also bear similar names, though Cercomonas was identified first (in 1841).

== History of knowledge ==
The genus was discovered in 2004 by Flemming Ekelund, Niels Daugbjerg, and Line Fredslund, whose phylogenetic analysis of rDNA sequences led them to conclude that the genus Cercomonas should be separated into two taxa, with the new one being named Neocercomonas. In 2006 Karpov et al. determined that there was insufficient evidence for its status as a separate genus and reclassified it as part of Cercomonas, but study of differences in microtubule nucleation by Karpov and Cavalier-Smith in 2012 re-established it as a genus, and more recent genetic analysis seems to support Neocercomonas being a monophyletic group.

== Habitat and ecology ==
Organisms belonging to this genus occur in terrestrial systems, most often in forested, agricultural, or otherwise plant-rich areas. Some may be found aboveground on leaf surfaces, while others live amongst soil particles. In the former case, their ability to quickly reproduce while resisting desiccation is key to their ability to survive in an exposed environment.

== Description ==
Morphologically, Neocercomonas is similar to the genus Cercomonas, though genetic analysis has indicated that they are separate taxa. Cells are 13-60 micrometers long, feed on bacteria, and are usually flattened in shape. They have a ragged 'tail' formed from the protoplasm at their posterior end, as well as two flagella near the front end of the cell, each being around one and a half times the cell's length. The anterior flagellum beats rapidly in front of the cell to propel its movement; the posterior flagellum remains attached to both the body and the substrate to provide stability while the organism glides. Two cytoskeletal 'roots' are attached to different points along the posterior flagellum's length, adding further support.

After having settled on a substrate for some time, Neocercomonas may also deploy pseudopodia from the posterior end of the cell. The anterior flagellum will continue to move after pseudopodia have been extended, though usually in a more erratic manner.

Within the cell there is an anterior nucleus, accompanied by numerous contractile vacuoles spread throughout the cell. The cytoplasm tends to be filled with small granules, some of which are refractive, making it difficult to observe the organelles. As part of their life cycle, cells may form round cysts 5-13 micrometers in diameter.

Some species (N. dactyloptera and N. braziliensis) have been noted as having a particularly strong anterior cytoskeleton, though it is unknown whether this is the case for all Neocercomona species. The species Neocercomonas grandis is the largest known member of the order Cercomonadida.

== List of species ==
- Neocercomonas braziliensis (Howe & Cavalier-Smith 2009) Cavalier-Smith & Karpov 2012
- Neocercomonas celer (Bass, Mylnikov & Cavalier-Smith 2009) Cavalier-Smith & Karpov 2012
- Neocercomonas clavideferens (Vickerman 2009) Cavalier-Smith & Karpov 2012
- Neocercomonas dactyloptera (Skuja 1939) Cavalier-Smith & Karpov 2012
- Neocercomonas effusa (Vickerman 2009) Cavalier-Smith & Karpov 2012
- Neocercomonas epiphylla Flues et al. 2018
- Neocercomonas gigantica (Mylnikov 2002) Cavalier-Smith & Karpov 2012
- Neocercomonas grandis (Maskell 1886) Cavalier-Smith & Karpov 2012
- Neocercomonas incurva (Skuja 1939) Cavalier-Smith & Karpov 2012
- Neocercomonas jendrali
- Neocercomonas jutlandica Ekelund, Fredslund & Daugbjerg 2004
- Neocercomonas lata (Bass, Mylnikov & Cavalier-Smith 2009) Cavalier-Smith & Karpov 2012
- Neocercomonas magna (Howe & Cavalier-Smith 2009) Cavalier-Smith & Karpov 2012
- Neocercomonas nitschei Flues et al. 2018
- Neocercomonas parincurva (Howe & Cavalier-Smith 2009) Cavalier-Smith & Karpov 2012
- Neocercomonas pigra (Vickerman 2009) Cavalier-Smith & Karpov 2012
- Neocercomonas sphagnicola (Vickerman 2009) Cavalier-Smith & Karpov 2012
- Neocercomonas tuberculata Flues et al. 2018
- Neocercomonas vacuolata (Howe & Cavalier-Smith 2009) Cavalier-Smith & Karpov 2012
