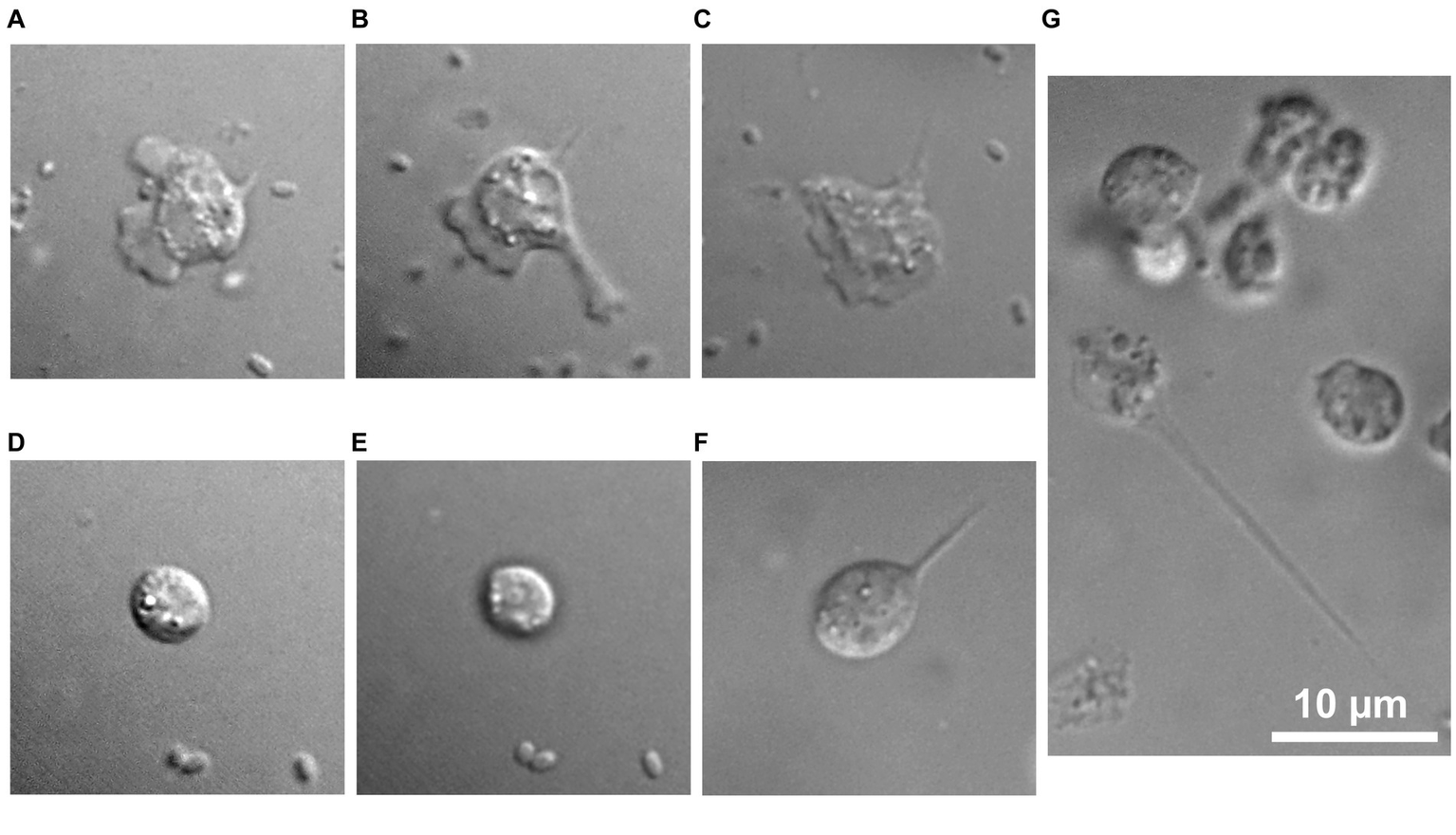
- Different forms of R. vilicus

Scientific classification
- Domain: Eukaryota
- Clade: Sar
- Clade: Rhizaria
- Phylum: Cercozoa
- Subphylum: Filosa
- Superfamily: Sainouroidea
- Family: Guttulinopsidae
- Genus: Rosculus; Hawes, 1963

Species
- R. elongatus; R. hawesii; R. incognitus; R. ithacus; R. liberus; R. macrobrachii; R. philanguis; R. piscicus; R. terrestris; R. vilicus; R. vulgaris

= Rosculus =

Genus of parasitic organisms

Rosculus is a genus of parasitic organisms which are poorly studied. Taxonomically, Rosculus is currently accepted to be in the superfamily Sainouroidea. Many species in this genus are aquatic, but genomic data shows that some species are terrestrial. Rosculus is thought to thrive in anaerobic and aerobic environments. This protist is very small in size, and it contains a massive genome. One defining characteristic of Rosculus is its discoidal cristae but morphologically.

== Taxonomy ==
Rosculus is a genus of organisms in the supergroup Rhizaria. Under Rhizaria, it is in Cercozoa and Sainouroidea. Little research has been published on sainouroids, however, data suggests that this group is very genetically remarkably diverse. Current publications suggest that Sainouroidea contains nine genera. Rosculus is not a well-studied genus in protistology. Like many protists, Rosculus has a limited quantity of published, up to date information. The taxonomic information published changes frequently and published scientific papers should be scouted recently for the most up to date information. Currently, Rosculus also contains a handful of published species.

== Genomic information ==
Several published Rosculus species include R. ithacus, R. elongatus, and R. terrestris. One Rosculus species, R. vilicus is reported to have a massive mitochondrial genome, made up of about 185,000 bp. For reference, human mitochondrial genomes only contain 16,569 bp. Rosculus's nuclear genome contains 41 million bp.

== Size and locomotion ==
Rosculus is tiny in size. This genus contains organisms that range from 2-13 micrometers in length. What is more interesting is the locomotion of Rosculus. When these species are on the move, they often range from 4.2 to 5.5 micrometers in diameter. These organisms have an interesting movement style. Organisms in this group move very rapidly or abruptly. They use one long hyaline pseudopod to traverse their environments. One paper suggests that the movement of Rosculus is rippling or wave-like. When looking closely at Rosculus scientists have also observed a cyst formation as well, which is a sort of dormant reproductive stage where we do not see this movement.

== Living environment and parasitism ==
Rosculus are often found in freshwater environments. This genus thrives between 20-25 °C. Often, Rosculus are parasitic, and they can live in fish feces. Although Rosculus is often associated with aquatic environments, Rosculus was first discovered in the European grass snake's feces. Rosculus is especially successful living in feces because animal excrements are very nutrient rich. These environments, however, are anaerobic, which indicates that Rosculus does not need a large amount of oxygen to thrive. On the other hand, Rosculus can also live in other environments. Rosculus has been found in agricultural environments such as soil, which is typically richer in oxygen than digestive tracts, and elephant dung. Since most Rosculus species are found in feces, it is very possible that soil which contains Rosculus is well fertilized. Rosculus is likely amphicozoic. That means that this genus is a free-living parasitic organism. It does not depend on its host for survival. Rosculus is only known to parasitize animal hosts. One (albeit older source claims that Rosculus has been found in human throats and on maize. One issue with poorly studied organisms is that there is a fair bit of information that may not be accurate anymore as our taxonomic understanding shifts. While Rosculus is a known parasite, it is also a beast of a predator. This organism only needs to eat bacteria to survive, and in fecal material, they have no lack of bacterial resources.

== Other morphological traits ==
One defining trait for Rosculus is seen in their mitochondrial cristae. These cristae are mitochondrial folds. They are necessary for respiration in aerobic organisms, which is interesting, noting a previous statement that most of Rosculus is aerobic, however, some members of this group are anaerobic. These naked amoebae have discoidal instead of tubulo-vescular cristae. Furthermore, Rosculus has a spotted or sandy-like granuloplasm. A granuloplasm is a textured location in the cytoplasm which consists of various organelles and assists in carrying out cellular functions.
