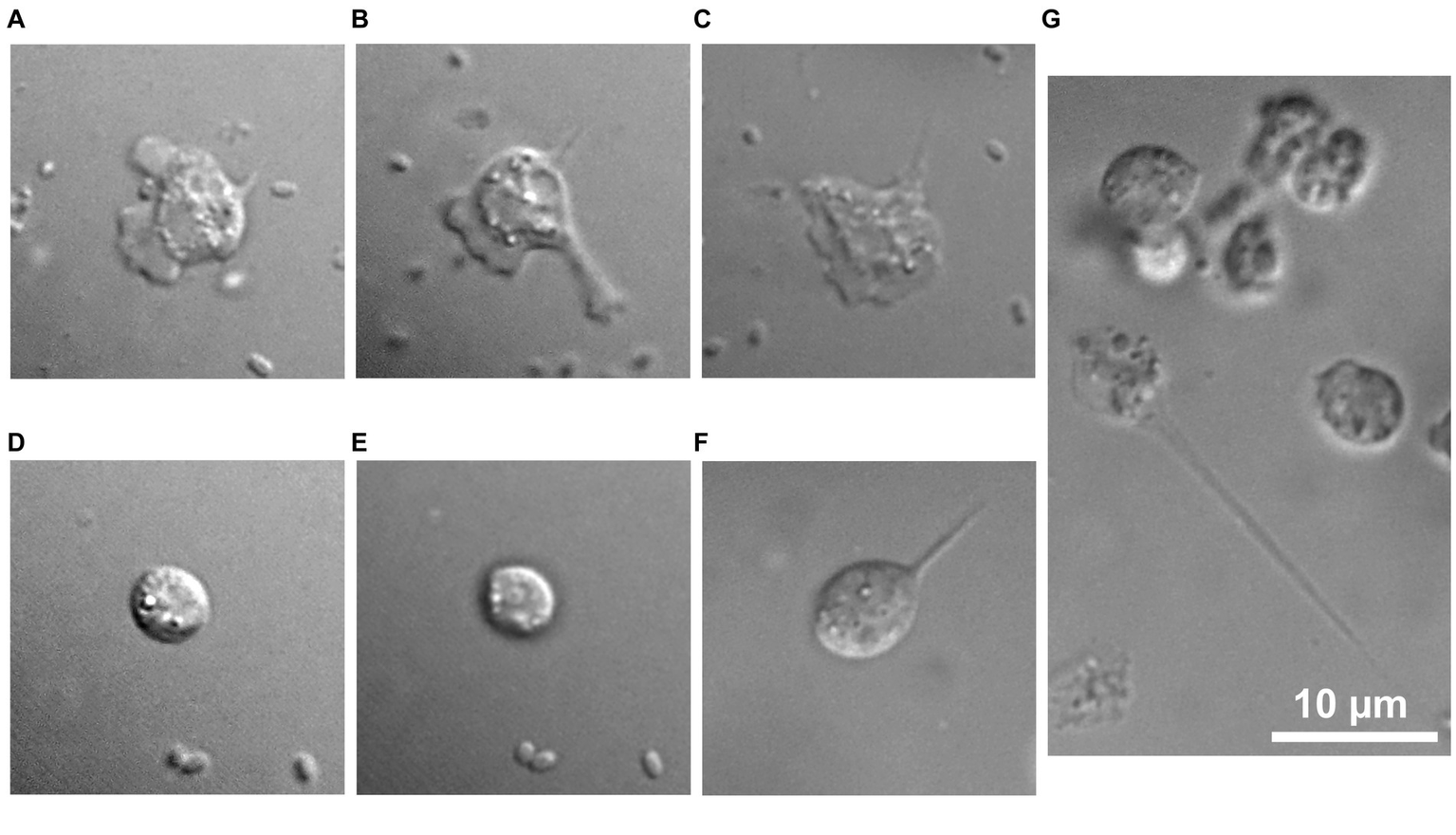
- Different forms of Rosculus vilicus

Scientific classification
- Domain: Eukaryota
- Supergroup: Rhizaria
- Phylum: Cercozoa
- Subphylum: Filosa
- Infraphylum: Monadofilosa
- Superfamily: Sainouroidea; Cavalier-Smith in Cavalier-Smith et al. 2009

Type genus
- Sainouron Sandon 1924

Families
- "Sainouridae"; Helkesimastigoidea; Helkesimastigidae; Guttulinopsidae

Diversity
- 29 species

Synonyms
- Sainouroida Ruggiero et al. 2015; Helkesea Cavalier-Smith 2018; Helkesida Cavalier-Smith 2018

= Sainouroidea =

Superfamily of eukaryotic microorganisms

Sainouroidea is a superfamily of microscopic protists belonging to the supergroup Rhizaria, both discovered through molecular phylogenetic analyses. It contains amoeboid flagellates with two flagella. They are either free-living, mostly on fecal matter, or live inside the gut of animals. Among these amoebae, one lineage has independently evolved aggregative multicellularity similarly to slime moulds.

== Biology ==
Sainouroids commonly have a gliding motility in which the cells glide on their posterior flagellum. They are ancestrally amoeboid bi-flagellates without scales or theca. Unlike most Cercozoa which have tubular mitochondrial cristae, they can also present flat cristae or discoid cristae. They are the only group within Rhizaria that present discoid mitochondrial cristae.

These organisms have an amorphous apical centrosome attached to the nucleus by a rhizoplast. The kinetid arises from 2–4 very short centrioles with dense fibrous roots that attach them to each other and to the nucleus. Their anterior flagellum is reduced to a stub without its 9+2 axoneme. The centrosome also generates numerous microtubules in larger cells. The Golgi apparatus is seen attached to the nuclear envelope and the anterior rhizoplast. They have a microbody attached to the posterior end of the nucleus.

One sainouroid genus, Guttulinopsis, represents an independent lineage in which aggregative multicellularity has evolved to generate "fungi-like" fruiting bodies called sorocarps, similarly to slime moulds such as Dictyostelium.

== Ecology ==
The sainouroid amoebae are bacterivores that can be free-living, mostly associated to fecal environments, or endozoic, associated to animals. They thrive in aerobic conditions and the microaerophilic gut environment of animals. Rosculus can thrive in anaerobic culture. It is unknown if their preferred habitat is free-living or endozoic.

Some host species can harbor different sainouroid genera and species. One animal can be infected by multiple species simultaneously, and one species can also infect different animal hosts. More sampling of hosts, amoebae and molecular data is needed to better understand the life history and ecology of these protists.

== Evolution and systematics ==
=== History ===
Sainouroidea was discovered in 2009 as a highly divergent clade within Cercozoa through phylogenetic analyses that used the sequencing of 18S ribosomal RNA from Cholamonas cytrodiopsidis, Sainouron acronematica and Helkesimastix marina. It is a molecularly diverse clade that branches within a group of ancestrally amoeboid bi-flagellates that usually lack an outer cell coat, known as Monadofilosa. A 2016 study revealed a previously unknown wide diversity of Sainouroidea in fecal environments. Previous environmental samplings excluded sequences from Sainouroidea due to their highly divergent 18S rDNA sequences.

The initial name for this group, Sainouroidea, had the -oidea suffix for superfamilies, it was not assigned to any existing orders due to the uncertainty of its phylogenetic position. In a 2018 revision, the order Helkesida was created as a substitute for this name, now also including the family Guttulinopsidae. It was placed in a new class Helkesea, which also included the order Ventricleftida. Superfamily Sainouroidea was modified to only include one of the three helkesid families, Sainouridae. A second superfamily, Helkesimastigoidea, was created to host the remaining two families, Helkesimastigidae and Guttulinopsidae.

Later, in another 2018 revision, order Ventricleftida was transferred to a new subclass named Ventricleftia in class Thecofilosea instead, class Helkesea remained monotypic. A 2018 study described several new genera and species, and used the name Sainouroidea for all three families and new genera. New genera described in that study were later assigned to the families Sainouridae and Guttulinopsidae in 2019 by Adl et al. The name Sainouroidea remains the mostly used name for this whole clade. Helkesimastigoidea is monophyletic.

=== Classification ===
Phylogeny of Sainouroidea

- - Cholamonas
  - - Sainouron
    - - - Acantholus
        - Homocognata
      - Helkesimastigoidea
        - Helkesimastigidae
          Helkesimastix
        - Guttulinopsidae
          - Puppisaman
          - - - Olivorum
              - - multicellularity
                  Guttulinopsis
            - Rosculus

Cladogram of Sainouroidea, based on a 18S rDNA phylogenetic analysis within a 2018 study.

Currently, Sainouroidea contains 9 genera and 3 families. Additionally, many OTUs found through environmental sequencing may represent undescribed clades.

- Superfamily Sainouroidea Cavalier-Smith in Cavalier-Smith et al. 2009
  - Family Sainouridae Cavalier-Smith et al. 2008 (paraphyletic)
    - Acantholus Schuler & Brown in Schuler et al. 2018
    - Cholamonas Flavin et al. 2000
    - Homocognata Schuler, Silberman & Brown in Schuler et al. 2018
    - Sainouron Sandon 1924
  - Clade Helkesimastigoidea Cavalier-Smith 2018
    - Family Helkesimastigidae Cavalier-Smith in Cavalier-Smith et al. 2009
      - Helkesimastix Woodcock & Lapage 1915
    - Family Guttulinopsidae Olive 1970
      - Guttulinopsis Olive 1901
      - Olivorum Schuler, Tice, Silberman & Brown in Schuler et al. 2018
      - Puppisaman Schuler & Brown in Schuler et al. 2018
      - Rosculus Hawes 1963
