= Pinaciophora =

Scientific classification
- Domain: Eukaryota
- Kingdom: incertae sedis
- Genus: Pinaciophora; Greeff, 1873

Genus of single-celled organisms

Pinaciophora is an amoeboid genus of uncertain affinity, previously classified as Rhizaria or the now-discredited Heliozoa. It has also been placed in Nucleariida, which remains a possibility based on morphology. There is no molecular data available for a definite placement as of 2019.

It includes the species Pinaciophora fluviatilis.
