= Sainouridae =

Scientific classification
- Domain: Eukaryota
- Supergroup: Rhizaria
- Phylum: Cercozoa
- Subphylum: Filosa
- Superfamily: Sainouroidea
- Family: Sainouridae; Cavalier-Smith et al. 2008

Type genus
- Sainouron Sandon 1924

Genera
- Acantholus; Cholamonas; Homocognata; Sainouron

Family of protozoa

Sainouridae is a family of cercozoan protists, currently classified within the superfamily Sainouroidea.
