= Ventricleftida =

- Ventrifissura sp. from Powell River, British Columbia, Canada.

Scientific classification
- Domain: Eukaryota
- Supergroup: Rhizaria
- Phylum: Cercozoa
- Subphylum: Filosa
- Class: Thecofilosea
- Order: Ventricleftida; Cavalier-Smith in Howe et al. 2011

Families
- Ventrifissuridae; Verrucomonadidae; And see text

Diversity
- 6 species

Order of thecate cercozoans

Ventricleftids are a group of thecate zooflagellates that are members of the cercozoan order Ventricleftida. They have dorsoventrally and strongly flattened oval cells. They are known for having a ventral cleft. Filose pseudopods emerge from the ventral cleft. Their flagella emerge subapically. They live in marine environments and both found in Canada and Japan. The order belongs to class Thecofilosea and contains six species across two families and two genera. The two genera in this group, Ventrifissura and Verrucomonas were previously considered tectofilosids. The order's name comes from "venter" meaning belly and "cleft", because of the ventral cleft.

== Characteristics ==
Ventricleftids are a group of dorsoventrally and strongly flattened oval zooflagellates. Scales are nonexistent, extrusomes and rigid theca are present. Two unequal flagella emerge subapically, often from apical notch. Posterior flagellum helps gliding on surfaces. Branched filose pseudopods for feeding emerge from ventral cleft that are separate from and behind the flagellar groove, unlike thaumatomonads and Auranticordis. Verrucomonas has colored warts ranging from yellowish to red, brownish, and golden on the cell surface.

== Taxonomy ==
The order Ventricleftida belongs to class Thecofilosea and phylum Cercozoa and contains six species across two families and two genera:

- Order Ventricleftida Cavalier-Smith in Howe et al. 2011
  - Family Ventrifissuridae Cavalier-Smith in Cavalier-Smith, Chao & Lewis 2018
    - Genus Ventrifissura Chantangsi & Leander 2010, emend. Shiratori, Yabuki & Ishida 2020
      - V. artocarpoidea Chantangsi & Leander 2010
      - V. foliiformis Chantangsi & Leander 2010
      - V. oblonga Shiratori, Yabuki & Ishida 2020
      - V. velata Shiratori, Yabuki & Ishida 2020
  - Family Verrucomonadidae Cavalier-Smith in Cavalier-Smith, Chao & Lewis 2018
    - Genus Verrucomonas Chantangsi & Leander 2010
      - V. bifida Chantangsi & Leander 2010
      - V. longifila Chantangsi & Leander 2010

== Ecology and distribution ==
Ventricleftids are marine organisms. They can be found in coastal environments such as sand habitats. They were reported in both Canada and Japan.

== History ==
The genera Ventrifissura and Verrucomonas were described in 2010, each containing two species. All species were collected from Vancouver, British Columbia, Canada. On the basis of a SSU rDNA tree, they were added to the order Tectofilosida, because in that tree they branched near some uncultured tectofilosids. In 2011, based on SSU rDNA trees, these two genera were transferred to a new order called Ventricleftida in class Thecofilosea. Ventricleftida was recovered as the most basal thecofilosean group. Its name comes from "venter" meaning belly and "cleft", because of the ventral cleft. In 2018, two families were created for two genera, Ventrifissuridae for Ventrifissura and Verrucomonadidae for Verrucomonas. In 2020, two new species of Ventrifissura from Tokyo Bay, Japan and Oarai Sun Beach, Ibaraki, Japan were described. In 2026, it was also reported that a Ventrifissura species was in Powell River, British Columbia, Canada and a Verrucomonas species was in Quadra Island, British Columbia, Canada.

== Phylogeny ==
A phylogenomic analysis in 2026 recovered Ventricleftida as the most basal group within Thecofilosea. Chlamydophryidae is represented by Katarium.

- Thecofilosea
  - - - - Phaeodaria
        - Fiscullidae
      - Chlamydophryidae
    - Eothecia
      - - Cryomonadida
        - Matazida
      - Ebriida
  - Ventricleftida
    - - Novel Clade A
      - Verrucomonadidae
    - - Ventrifissuridae
      - eVentri
