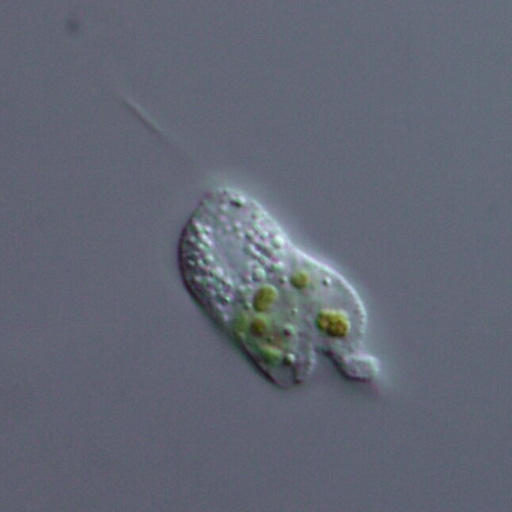
- Cercomonas sp.

Scientific classification
- Domain: Eukaryota
- Clade: Sar
- Clade: Rhizaria
- Phylum: Cercozoa
- Subphylum: Filosa
- Order: Cercomonadida
- Family: Cercomonadidae
- Genus: Cercomonas; Dujardin 1841, emend. Karpov et al. 2006

Type species
- Cercomonas longicauda Dujardin 1841

Species
- See text

= Cercomonas =

Genus of cercomonad protists

Cercomonas is a genus of flagellate cercomonads.

== Characteristics ==
Members of this genus of cercomonads move by gliding. They are typically spindle-shaped. They have a trailing posterior flagellum that usually extends all the way to the rear of the cell body. The pseudopods and filopodia, which are generally unbranched, are broad and flat-lobed and occur frequently. The nuclear extension extends distinctly toward the nearby centrioles. Tubular mitochondrial cristae are usually slightly flattened. A proximal cartwheel is typically present in the anterior centriole but not in the posterior centriole. Both centrioles contain a thick distal compartment with a more distinct, diaphragm-like outer region. A fibrillar striated projection is present only in the anterior centriole. Posterior centriole has a single proximal transverse plate. Extrusomes can be considered nearly isodiametric osmiophilic bodies. Some species also have a complex life cycle that includes multinucleate plasmodia and spherical cysts, which can be either smooth or rough walled.

== Taxonomy ==
It belongs to the family Cercomonadidae, order Cercomonadida and phylum Cercozoa and contains eighty-three species.

Species:

- Cercomonas activa
- Cercomonas acuta
- Cercomonas alexeieffii
- Cercomonas alternans
- Cercomonas ambigua
- Cercomonas angusta
- Cercomonas biflagellata
- Cercomonas bodo
- Cercomonas brasilica
- Cercomonas breviantennata
- Cercomonas canis
- Cercomonas chromatiophaga
- Cercomonas cometa
- Cercomonas cylindrica
- Cercomonas deformans
- Cercomonas digitalis
- Cercomonas diparavarians
- Cercomonas draco
- Cercomonas dubia
- Cercomonas elliptica
- Cercomonas falcula
- Cercomonas fastiga
- Cercomonas fusiformis
- Cercomonas gallinarum
- Cercomonas globulus
- Cercomonas granulata
- Cercomonas granulifera
- Cercomonas hederae
- Cercomonas heimii
- Cercomonas heterofilum
- Cercomonas hiberna
- Cercomonas jutlandica
- Cercomonas karpovii
- Cercomonas kiaerdammanei
- Cercomonas kolskia
- Cercomonas laciniaegerens
- Cercomonas laeva
- Cercomonas lagoenaris
- Cercomonas lapsa
- Cercomonas lenta
- Cercomonas levis
- Cercomonas lobata
- Cercomonas longicauda
- Cercomonas lymnaei
- Cercomonas media
- Cercomonas mtolerae
- Cercomonas mutabilis
- Cercomonas mutans
- Cercomonas nebulosa
- Cercomonas norrvicensis
- Cercomonas onusta
- Cercomonas ovata
- Cercomonas pachypus
- Cercomonas paraglobosa
- Cercomonas parambigua
- Cercomonas paravarians
- Cercomonas parva
- Cercomonas parvula
- Cercomonas phylloplana
- Cercomonas plasmodialis
- Cercomonas pronucleata
- Cercomonas pseudocrassicauda
- Cercomonas pseudodactyloptera
- Cercomonas pyriformis
- Cercomonas ranarum
- Cercomonas rapida
- Cercomonas rhacodytes
- Cercomonas rhynchophora
- Cercomonas ricae
- Cercomonas robusta
- Cercomonas rotunda
- Cercomonas simplex
- Cercomonas skvortzovii
- Cercomonas thermo
- Cercomonas truncata
- Cercomonas typica
- Cercomonas undulans
- Cercomonas varians
- Cercomonas ventricosa
- Cercomonas viridis
- Cercomonas volcana
- Cercomonas wylezichii
- Cercomonas zhukovii
