= NOTCH (magazine) =

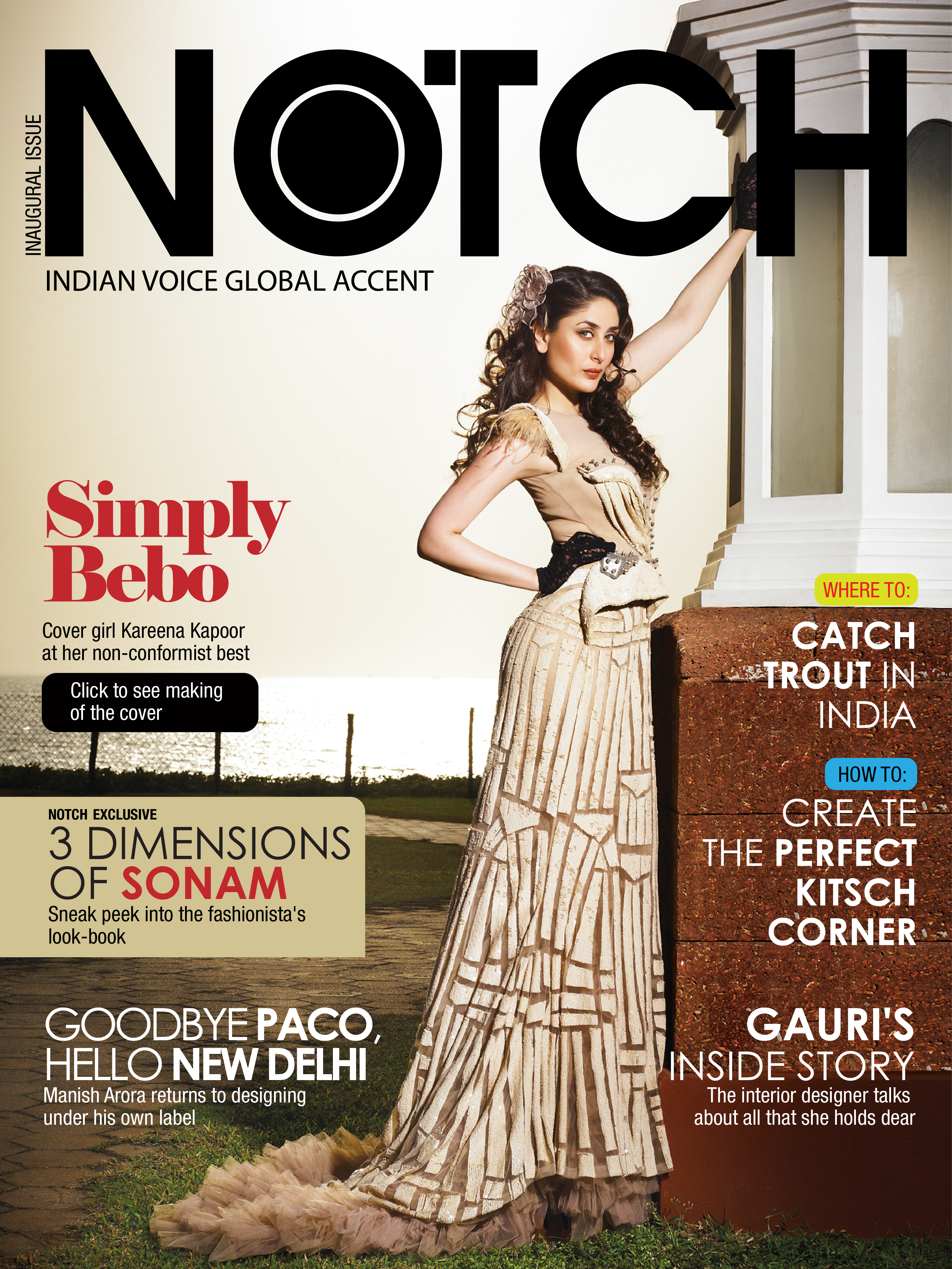
- NOTCH, September 2012
- Categories: Entertainment/lifestyle digital magazine
- Frequency: Monthly
- Publisher: NOTCH Media Pvt., Ltd
- Founded: 2012
- First issue: September 2012
- Country: India
- Language: English
- Website: notchmag.com

NOTCH is an Indian entertainment and lifestyle online magazine. It is part of privately held Pradeep Dadha Group of Companies, with Pradeep Dadha as chairman. NOTCH's corporate office is located in Chennai, India.

== History ==
The online magazine was launched in September 2012, and the cover of the first issue featured Bollywood actress Kareena Kapoor. In addition to stories, the magazine includes multimedia content.

== Target audience ==
NOTCH is geared to Indian consumers as well as non-resident Indians (NRI) living outside of India.
