= Fonticula =

- Macro photograph of an F. alba colony radius growing on a plate.

Scientific classification
- Domain: Eukaryota
- Supergroup: Amorphea
- Clade: Obazoa
- Clade: Opisthokonta
- Clade: Holomycota
- Order: Rotosphaerida
- Family: Nucleariidae
- Genus: Fonticula; Worley, Raper & Hohl 1979
- Species: F. alba

Binomial name
- Fonticula alba O'Kelly & Nerad 1999

Slime mold that forms a volcano-shaped fruiting body

Fonticula is a genus of cellular slime mold that forms a fruiting body in a volcano shape. As long ago as 1979 it has been known to not have a close relationship with either the Dictyosteliida or the Acrasidae, the two well-established groups of cellular slime molds. In 1979, Fonticula was made a new genus of its own due to the unique characteristics of its fruiting body, with only one species: Fonticula alba.

The life cycle of Fonticula alba alternates between an amoeboid vegetative stage and aggregative fruiting stage. The fruiting body of the genus has a unique shape, as its sorocarp resembles a volcano and sorus looks like a ball of hot lava emerging from that volcano.

Molecular phylogenies have found alignments in genes of Fonticula alba to subgroups in Opisthokonta. A 2009 study has found that Fonticula is the sister taxa to Nuclearia, thus making it related to the kingdom Fungi.

Fonticula, Nuclearia, and Fungi have been united into the Holomycota, which is sister to the Holozoa.

== History and etymology ==
While working at the University of Wisconsin in 1979, Ann Worley, Kenneth Raper and Marianne Hohl discovered an organism that fit no recognized genus of the slime mold taxon Acrasiomycetes. At the time, Acrasiomycetes could be divided into two classes: Acrasidae and Dictyostelidae. This classification was based on morphological characteristics, but it is now known that the two subgroups are not closely related. Moreover, F. alba did not truly fit into either of these subclasses but shared a few characteristics of both. Although F. alba shared characteristics of subclasses within Acrasiomycetes, Worley et al. (1979) were convinced that its best fit taxonomically would be in a new, undescribed family designated as Fonticulaceae, which would then contain the genus Fonticula. The new genus name Fonticula is a reference to the fruiting-body morphology: Fonti- from the Latin word Fons (fountain, "shape, form") and -cula, from Latin diminutive culus (little, "size").

Opisthokonta is an exceptionally diverse eukaryotic group, containing shared ancestry between fungi, animals and even a few protists (Brown et al., 2009). In 2009 it was concluded that the genus Fonticula is part of the unranked group Opisthokonta. Brown et al. (2009) sequenced nuclear encoded genes of Fonticula alba for phylogenetic analysis and concluded that the genus was a sister group to the filose amoebae in the genus Nuclearia and that the Fonticula and Nuclearia clade are sister groups to fungi.

== Description ==
=== Morphology and anatomy ===
The morphological characteristics of genus Fonticula are unlike those seen in slime mold subgroups Acrasidae or Dictyostelidae. Several studies have found that in its vegetative state, myxamoebae of F. alba are generally small and irregular in form, ranging from 8–12 x 6–10 μm in size. The myxamoebae have finger-like projections deemed as filose pseudopodia, which extent at the posterior or lateral ends of the cell. Worley et al. (1979) found that the myxamoebae had a distinguishable ectoplasm and endoplasm. The clear ectoplasm is on the outer edges, while the inner endoplasm is more granular. Vacuoles are also found in numerous digestion stages in actively feeding F. abla. These small vacuoles contain bacteria. In active feeding stages, there is a slime coat surrounding the myxamoeba to which bacteria sink onto. The ultrastructure of Fonticula also includes small contractile vacuoles, which are mainly deposited towards the posterior end of the cell. An ultrastructural feature that is shared between Fonticula and certain Acrasidae is mitochondria with discoid cristae. The golgi apparatus lends a helping hand in the fruiting stage in Fonticula as numerous dictyosomes are involved in the sorogenesis process. Cells in the genus are generally uninucleate, however there have been cases of some cells containing two or even three nuclei. The nucleus of F. alba cells have an inconspicuous nucleolus under the light microscope. The fruiting body of F. alba contains an unbranched sorocarp composed of upright tapered stalks, which apically bear a round source containing spores. Stalks range from 200–500 μm in length. The sori on the fruiting body are white, and roughly 200–350 μm in diameter. Spores are cystic in shape, and roughly 5.0–6.0 μm in diameter.

=== Phylogenetics ===
Multigene phylogenetic analysis was conducted in F. alba in 2009, which allowed it to be placed into Opisthokonta. The five nuclear encoded genes that were sequenced were: small subunit ribosomal RNA (SSU rRNA), actin, beta-tubulin, elongation factor 1-alpha (EF1-a) and heat shock protein 70 (HSP70). The study's results depicted that from 42 eukaryotic taxa, many alignments were made with a total of 2802 aligned sequences (Brown et al., 2009). Phylogenetic trees based on the molecular genetics sequenced in this study showed that the genus Fonticula was a sister taxon to the genus Nuclearia. Those two sister taxa as a clade are in turn a sister taxa to Fungi. Fonticula therefore represents the first evolution of an organism with a cellular slime mold-like morphology within the broad-group Opisthokonta (Brown et al., 2009); (Brown, 2010).

Another study done by Barlow et al. in 2014 traced the evolution of the five adaptor protein (AP) complexed in fungi, but also provided some insight onto Fonticula alba. The adaptor proteins investigated work in vesicular transport in eukaryotes, particularly in cargo-selection and coat-protein recruitment. The study found that F. alba had all five adaptor protein complexes present in its genome, whereas the kingdom Fungi only retained the first three adaptor protein complexes (Barlow et al., 2014). This study concluded that the last common ancestor of the sister groups Fungi, and Fonticula and Nuclearia (also known as the clade Holomycota) contained a complete set of all five adaptor protein complexes.

=== Life cycle ===
An amoeboid trophic phase alternating with an aggregating fruiting phase describes the life cycle of F. alba. Fruiting bodies are volcano-like structures that are unique to its genus. Commencing of the fruiting stage occurs when trophic amoeba halt their feeding, and dense aggregations begin to form (Deasey, 1982). Over time, an envelope of a mucus-like substance begins to surround the aggregated amoebae. The amoebae at the top of the aggregation begin to project upward, and a hyaline membrane is laid down onto the projection, as development occurs. Stalk material is secreted while the amoebae move upwards within the projection.

In early stages of orogenesis, the cells form a number of dictyosomes from the outer nuclear membrane in response to a certain stimuli. The dictyosomes aid in the accumulation and deposition of stalk material. The golgi apparatus in F. alba swells up, instead of having small vesicles pinch off is cristae, which is unique to the genus. The vesicles produce a thread-like material, within a mucous-matrix that lets the aggregated mound turn into a tapered stalk. The vesicles then release their internal contents via fusing with plasma membrane of the sorogenic cells. The material made within the vesicles is mostly assembled at the thick base of the stalk, and is thought to provide structural support. Cells are amoeboid during stalk formation.

As the sorocarp reaches max height, orogenic cells begin to depict differential shapes and thus different functions. Amoeboid cells remain near the base, continuously producing stalk material through their numerous dictyosomes during spore formation. These cells continue producing stalk material even when spores have been released. Cystic cells are above the amoeboid cells, these cells are preparing to flourish into spores and thus have less dictyosomes, known as "pre-spores".

The ultrastructural comparison between the amoeboid cells and pre-spores is quite evident. The pre-spores have less dictyosomes which tend to be flattened. As the number of dictyosomes decreases, the cytoplasm takes up more room within the cell and the cell adapts a more round shape (Deasey, 1982). There is also a difference in the plasma membrane of amoeboid orogenic cells and pre-spore cells. The pre-spore cells plasma membrane appears to be invaginated, whilst the amoeboid cells PM looks smooth (Deasey, 1982). Elliptical cells, located in the upper neck of the sorocarp are a little further along into spore-development than the cyst cells. These cells lack dictyosomes, are thick-walled and thought to increase pressure within the neck of the stalk. As pressure increases, the encysted cells will then come up from the apex and come together and form a large ball called the sorus. The majority of the cells within the source have successfully developed into spores. When the sorus is developed, the neck of the fruiting body is almost fully lacking in sorogenis cells. Amoeboid cells remain at the base of the sorocarp. Spores of F. alba release and flow as the stalk collapses as time goes on. The optimal pH for growth and fruiting-body development for Fonticula alba is a substrate with a near neutral pH. A lower pH may result in a poorly developed fruiting structure.

== Culturing techniques ==
The vegetative stage in F. alba consists of unicellular, myxamoeba that feed on bacterial cells. F. alba grows with Klebsiella pneumoniae upon a nutrient agar. In the study done by Worley et al (1979), Fonticula alba was cultured on a tryptone-glucose-yeast-extract agar.

Worley et al. (1979), also investigated the effect of substrate concentration on Fonticula alba cell growth and sorocarp formation. They found that on a more concentrated substrate, cell growth advanced more quickly and normal sorocarp formation followed. On less concentrated media, they found opposite results.

F. alba was also cultured with different strains of bacteria, to determine if other bacterial species could serve as a nutrient. The agar was streaked with different bacteria such as Bacillus megaterium, Serratia marcescens, Pseudomonas fluorescens, Micrococcus luteus, and Escherichia coli. The strains with B. megaterium, S. marcescens, and P. fluorescens sorocarps did develop, but lesser and later than normal. In the strains with M. luteus it was found that no sorocarps or myxamoebae grew. The strain with E. coli did show adequate growth and fruiting. However, compared to K. pneumoniae, the sorocarps that grew with E. coli were smaller in size.

F. alba grows at an optimal temperature range of 25–28 degrees celsius. However, it tends to grow at a broad range of 16–37 degrees celsius. Studies have shown that it does not grow at a lower bracket 10 degrees celsius or a higher bracket of 40 degrees celsius.
