= Ventrifissura =

- Ventrifissura sp. from Powell River, British Columbia, Canada.

Scientific classification
- Domain: Eukaryota
- Supergroup: Rhizaria
- Phylum: Cercozoa
- Subphylum: Filosa
- Class: Thecofilosea
- Order: Ventricleftida
- Family: Ventrifissuridae; Cavalier-Smith in Cavalier-Smith, Chao & Lewis 2018
- Genus: Ventrifissura; Chantangsi & Leander 2010, emend. Shiratori, Yabuki & Ishida 2020

Type species
- Ventrifissura artocarpoidea Chantangsi & Leander 2010

Species
- V. artocarpoidea; V. foliiformis; V. oblonga; V. velata

Genus of thecate cercozoans

Ventrifissura is a genus of marine gliding biflagellates. It belongs to its own family Ventrifissuridae in the order Ventricleftida and contains four species. Its name comes from "ventris" meaning belly and "fissura" meaning crack, cleft, chink.

== Characteristics ==
Ventrifissura is a genus of marine gliding biflagellates. A rigid extracellular theca, a single nucleus at the anterior end of the cell, highly slender extrusomes, ventral groove are present. Theca a monolayer structure covered with filamentous material. The nucleus is circular to oblong-shaped. Filopodia or lamellipodia present. Dorsoventrally flattened cells, ovoid or obovoid, smooth surfaces or with numerous pointed warts. Flagella is inserted subapically. An anterior protrusion is present in some species. A funnel is nonexisting in the flagellar pit.

== Taxonomy ==
The cercozoan genus Ventrifissura was described in 2010 with two species. It was assigned to the thecofilosean order Tectofilosida. Its name comes from "ventris" meaning belly and "fissura" meaning crack, cleft, chink. The name reflects that members within this genus have a slit on the ventral side. In 2011, it was assigned to a new thecofilosean order known as Ventricleftida. In 2018, it was assigned to its own family Ventrifissuridae. In 2020, two new species were described.

== Phylogeny ==
A phylogenetic analysis in 2020:

- eVentri
- Ventrifissuridae
  - - V. foliiformis
    - V. artocarpoidea
  - - V. oblonga
    - V. velata
