= Developmental niche =

The developmental niche is a theoretical framework for understanding and analyzing how culture shapes child development. Developed by Charles M. Super and Sara Harkness. It is theoretically related to, and shares some origins with, Weisner’s “ecocultural niche,” and Worthman’s “developmental microniche.” See also "evolved developmental niche."

== Description ==
The Super & Harkness developmental niche is explained as a tool for understanding how culture impacts development. This process uses the individual as the main focus of study and expands on the development of the niche. The collective qualities of her/his environment are created by the individual, who is able to make choices based on the available resources. However, these choices stem from cultural structure and the endogenous aspects of individual development or genetics and predisposition.

Two overarching principles reflect the framework’s in cultural anthropology and developmental psychology:

1. A child's environment is organized in a non-arbitrary manner as part of a cultural system
2. The child’s own disposition, including a particular constellation of attributes, temperament, skills, and potentials, affect the process of development.

The developmental niche is seen as the composite of three interacting subsystems:

1. Physical and social settings – who is there, what affordances are provided by the physical space
2. Customs and practices of child rearing – inherited and adapted ways of nurturing, entertaining, educating, and protecting the child
3. The psychology of the caretakers, particularly parental ethnotheories of child development and parenting, which play a directive role in actual practices.

The three subsystems of the developmental niche - settings, customs, and caretaker psychology - share the common function of mediating the child's developmental experience within the larger culture. Of particular significance for integrating research on these components are three corollaries:

1. The three components of the developmental niche operate together with powerful though incomplete coordination as a system. Thus for example in a stable cultural environment, customs of care reflect parental ethnotheories about the child, and they are further supported by the physical and social settings of daily life. In circumstances of rapid social change, or immigration, there will be greater inconsistency among the subsystems, but one can usually see homeostatic processes at work in the context of changing beliefs and practices.
2. Each of the three subsystems of the niche is functionally embedded in other aspects of the human ecology in specific and unique ways; in other words, the three subsystems act as the primary channels through which the niche, as an open system, is influenced by outside forces. Any one of the three components may be a primary route of influence. Economic or social change may lead to new settings for children, for example, and historical change in social values or in what “experts” and the public at large recognize as “good parenting” may directly affect parental ethnotheories, thereby activating change in customs and settings of care.
3. Each of the three subsystems of the niche is involved in a process of mutual adaptation with the individual child. Thus, the age, gender, temperament, and talents of the individual child influence parents and others in the niche, modulating cultural expectations and opportunities for the child at any given time.

The developmental niche framework makes evident the kind of systematic regularity that culture provides – environmental organization that emphasizes repeatedly or with singular salience the culture’s core “messages.” This quality, called “contemporary redundancy,” is important for the acquisition of skills and values as it offers multiple opportunities for learning the same thing, whether that “thing” is reading, caring for others, the communication of emotions, or the value of “independence.” The elaboration of themes over the course of developmental time reinforces lessons learned earlier and recasts them in a more adequate format for meeting the challenges of increasing maturity. As an organizer of the environment, culture assures that key meaning systems are elaborated in appropriate ways at different stages of development, and that the learning occurs across behavioral domains and various scales of time. It is through such cultural thematicity that the environment works its most profound influences on development.
