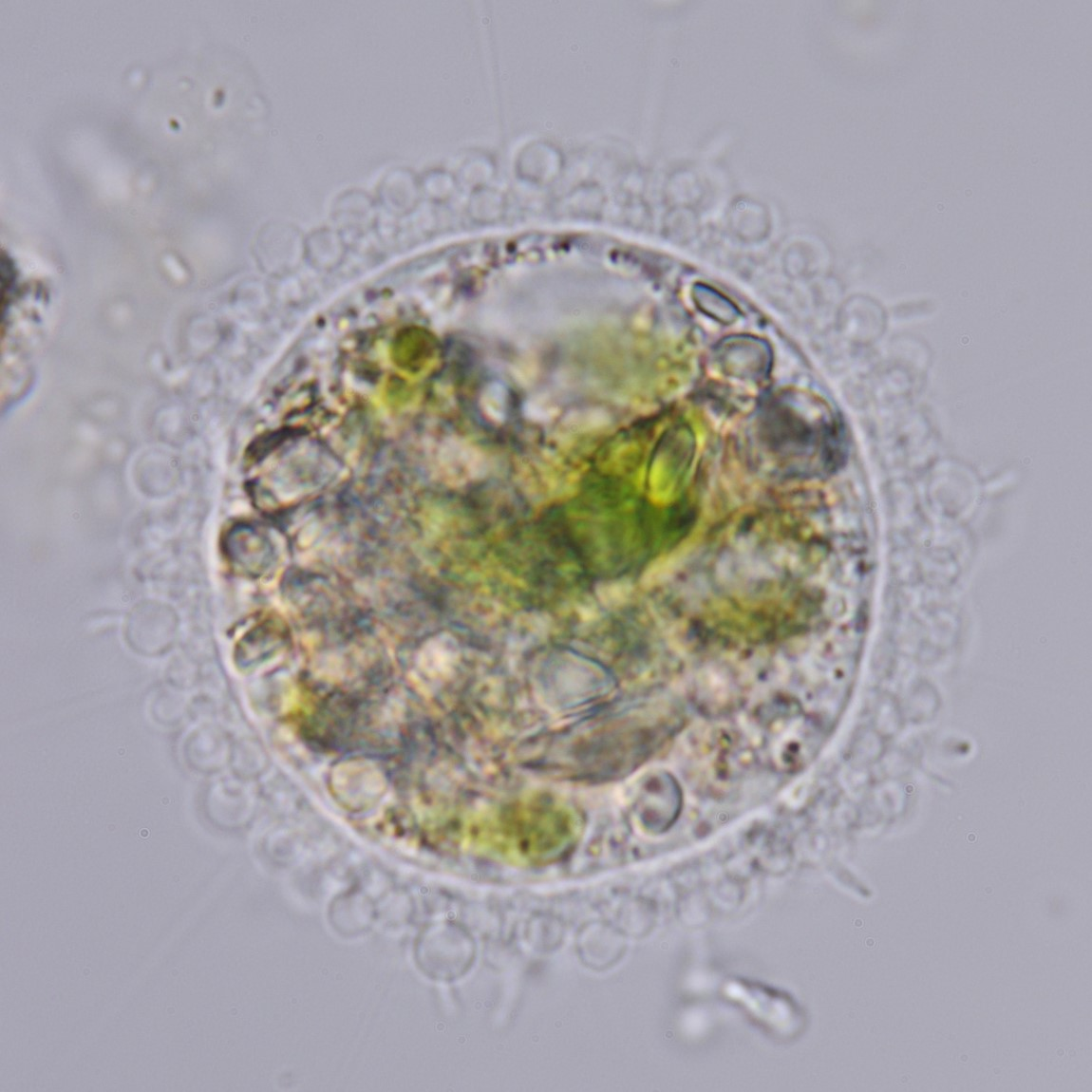
- Pompholyxophrys punicea

Scientific classification
- Domain: Eukaryota
- Clade: Obazoa
- Clade: Opisthokonta
- Order: Rotosphaerida
- Family: Nucleariidae
- Genus: Pompholyxophrys; Archer, 1869

= Pompholyxophrys =

Genus of single-celled organisms

Pompholyxophrys is a genus of Opisthokonta appearing as a scale-bearing filose amoeba.

It includes the species Pompholyxophrys punicea.
