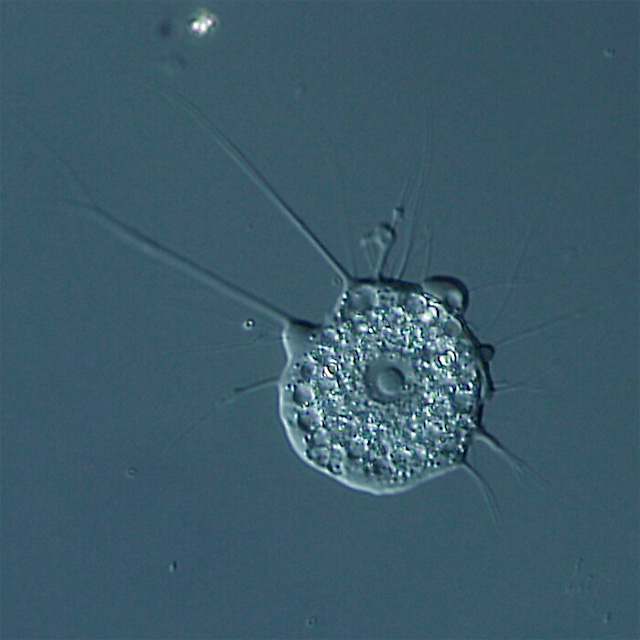
- Nuclearia thermophila

Scientific classification
- Domain: Eukaryota
- Clade: Obazoa
- Clade: Opisthokonta
- Order: Rotosphaerida
- Family: Nucleariidae
- Genus: Nuclearia; Cienkowsky, 1865

Type species
- Nuclearia simplex Cienkowsky 1865

Species
- See text

Synonyms
- Astrodisculus Greeff 1869; Heliosphaerium Frenzel 1897; Nuclearella Frenzel 1897; Nuclearina Frenzel 1897; Nucleosphaerium Cann & Page 1979

= Nuclearia =

Genus of protozoa

Nuclearia is a genus of nucleariid amoebae with filose pseudopodia and discoid mitochondrial cristae.

Nominal species treated as members of the genus include:

- Astrodisculus affinis Schouteden 1905
- Astrodisculus araneiformis Schewiakoff 1893
- Astrodisculus laciniatus Penard 1904 [Chlamydaster lacinatus (Penard 1904) Rainer 1968]
- Astrodisculus marinus Kufferath 1952
- Astrodisculus minutus Greeff 1869
- Heliophrys variabilis
- Nuclearina similis
- N. amphizonellae Penard 1917
- N. conspicua West 1903
- Nuclearia delicatula Cienkowsky 1865
- N. lohmanni Kufferath 1952
- N. pseudotenelloides
- N. flavescens (Greef 1869) Patterson 1984 [Astrodisculus flavescens Greeff 1869]
- N. flavocapsulata (Greef 1869) Patterson 1984 [Astrodisculus flavocapsulata Greeff 1869; Astrodisculus penari Roskin 1929; Astrodisculus serratus Walton 1930; Heliosphaerium polyedricum Frenzel 1897]
- N. leuckarti (Frenzel 1897) Patterson 1984 [Nuclearina leuckarti Frenzel 1897]
- N. moebiusi Frenzel 1897
- N. pattersoni Dyková et al. 2003
- N. polypodia Schewiakoff 1863
- N. radians (Greef 1869) Patterson 1984 [Astrodisculus radians Greeff 1869 sensu Penard 1904 non Stern 1924; Nucleosphaerium radians (Greef 1869); Nucleosphaerium tuckeri Cann & Page 1979; Heliosphaerium aster Frenzel 1897; Heliophrys varians West]
- N. simplex Cienkowsky 1865 [Nuclearella variabilis Frenzel 1897]
- N. thermophila Yoshida, Nakayama & Inouye 2009
- N. rubra (Greef 1869) Patterson 1984 [Astrodisculus rubra Greeff 1869; Astrodisculus zonatus Penard 1904; Nuclearia caulescens Penard 1903: pro parte; Nuclearia zonatus (Penard 1904) Siemensma 1981]

The type species is Nuclearia delicatula, which may adopt a spherical or a flattened body form.

There is considerable uncertainty as to the identity of species and genera, and this led to the inclusion in Nuclearia of taxa previously assigned to Astrodisculus, Nuclearella, Nuclearina, Heliosphaerium and Nucleosphaerium, and the diversity rendered to 9 clearly distinguishable species with the affinities of Astrodisculus araneiformis, A. minuta and A. marinus remaining unclear
