= Haplosporidium nelsoni =

Scientific classification
- Domain: Eukaryota
- Clade: Sar
- Clade: Rhizaria
- Phylum: Endomyxa
- Class: Ascetosporea
- Order: Haplosporida
- Family: Haplosporidiidae
- Genus: Haplosporidium
- Species: H. nelsoni

Binomial name
- Haplosporidium nelsoni Haskin, Stauber & Mackin, 1966

Species of protist

Haplosporidium nelsoni is a pathogen of oysters that originally caused oyster populations to experience high mortality rates in the 1950s, and still is quite prevalent today. The disease caused by H. nelsoni is also known as MSX (multinucleated unknown or multinuclear sphere X). MSX is thought to have been introduced by experimental transfers of the Pacific oyster (Crassostrea gigas), which is resistant to this disease.

MSX was first described in 1957, when it caused serious mortalities in Delaware Bay. Through extensive studies, an estimated 50% of eastern oyster (C. virginica) mortalities in lower Delaware Bay since the 1960s could be attributed to MSX infections, a devastating loss to the area.

Mortalities are usually highest in the summer, and also increase in higher-salinity waters. MSX reduces the feeding rates of infected oysters, leading to a reduced amount of stored carbohydrates. The reduction in stored carbohydrates inhibits normal gametogenesis in the spring, with a reduction in fecundity.

== Chesapeake Bay ==
In the spring of 1959, MSX appeared in the Chesapeake Bay. Within 3 years, more than 90% of the oysters in the lower bay were affected. Salinities of at least 15 ppt are considered necessary for infection with MSX, and salinities of about 20 ppt usually are necessary to elicit high oyster mortalities. The presence of H. nelsoni in the Chesapeake Bay has hindered attempts to return eastern oyster harvests to historic levels. Particularly severe has been the effect on oyster aquaculture, which was not practiced on a large scale in the Chesapeake Bay for 25 years following the introduction of the parasite, and currently is confined primarily to the low-salinity areas of the bay.

== Resistance ==
After more than 50 years of selection pressure, some populations of C. virginica have become resistant to the MSX. They are able to tolerate the infection for longer before dying. Artificial selection is able to achieve a similar result.

== See also ==
- Perkinsus marinus, also known as "dermo", is another oyster pathogen.
