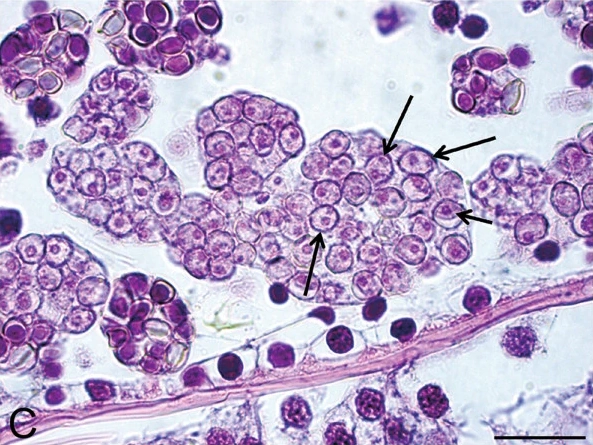
- Haplosporidium diporeiae

Scientific classification
- Domain: Eukaryota
- Clade: Sar
- Clade: Rhizaria
- Phylum: Endomyxa
- Class: Ascetosporea
- Order: Haplosporida
- Family: Haplosporidiidae
- Genus: Haplosporidium; Lühe, 1900

= Haplosporidium =

Genus of protists

Haplosporidium is a genus in the order Haplosporida.

They are a group of eukaryotes that are parasites of marine invertebrates, causing multiple disease which has high mortality to its host, including the notorious disease MSX, which caused massive oyster mortalities in Delaware Bay in 1957 and two years later in Chesapeake Bay.

There are four genera under order Haplosporida, according to the Hand book of the Protists(2017), The principal characteristics of this genus are spores with an apical-hinged operculum and a variety of extensions externally (tails, filaments, extensions, wrapping, folds, and epispore extensions) formed by the same material of the spore wall. The number of ornaments is variable according to the different species. The internal uninucleated endosporoplasm contains a spherulosome (structure formerly designated by the name “spherule”), generally located at the apical region of the spore, several haplosporosomes, and mitochondria.

== Species ==
- Haplosporidium armoricanum (Van Banning, 1977)
- Haplosporidium ascidiarum Duboscq & Harrant, 1923
- Haplosporidium cadomensis Marchand & Sprague, 1979
- Haplosporidium caulleryi Mercier & Poisson, 1922
- Haplosporidium comatulae La Haye, Holland & McLean, 1984
- Haplosporidium costale Wood & Andrews, 1962
- Haplosporidium edule Azevedo, Conchas & Montes, 2003 - parasitizes the digestive gland tissues of the cockle Cerastoderma edule in Galicia (northwest Spain) and has tape-like filaments.
- Haplosporidium heterocirri Caullery & Mesnil, 1899
- Haplosporidium hinei Bearham, Spiers, Raidal, Jones, Burreson & Nicholls, 2008
- Haplosporidium louisiana infects crabs, Panopeus herbstii in the USA, They are probably conspecific and regarded as H. louisiana. This species is phylogenetically basal to other Haplosporidium spp.
- Haplosporidium lusitanicum Azevedo, 1984 - parasitizes the gills and visceral tissues of Helcion pellucidus (Mollusca, Gastropoda). In the basal region of the spore, the wall is thicker and gives rise to two long tape-like proteinaceous filaments.
- Haplosporidium montforti Azevedo, Balseiro, Casal, Gestal, Aranguren, Stokes, Carnegie, Novoa, Burreson & Figueras, 2006
- Haplosporidium montforti infects the connective tissue, gill, digestive gland, and foot muscle of the abalone, Haliotis tuberculata, imported from Ireland and experimentally grown in Galicia, Spain.
- Haplosporidium nelsoni Haskin, Stauber & Mackin, 1966 - infected the eastern oyster (Crassostrea virginica), causing the disease MSX.
- Haplosporidium nemertis Debaisieux, 1920
- Haplosporidium parisi Ormières, 1980
- Haplosporidium pinnae very likely responsible for mass mortality of fan mussels, Pinna nobilis, in the Western Mediterranean Sea.
- Haplosporidium tumefacientis Taylor, 1966

== Disease ==
MSX(Multinucleated Sphere Unknown) is the disease caused by Haplosporidium nelsoni, MSX is lethal to the eastern oyster (Crassostrea virginica), The early MSX infections are found in the oyster’s gill. The infection spreads to the digestive diverticulum, and finally all the tissues of the oyster are filled with plasmodia. MSX infection is not directly transmissible from oyster to oyster. How the infection is transmitted is not yet known. Several researchers believe that an intermediate host is part of the life cycle of this parasite, but what the host is remains unknown. MSX disease is suppressed by low salinities and low temperatures.
