= Bonamia ostreae =

Scientific classification
- Domain: Eukaryota
- Clade: Sar
- Clade: Rhizaria
- Phylum: Endomyxa
- Class: Ascetosporea
- Order: Haplosporida
- Family: Haplosporiidae
- Genus: Bonamia
- Species: B. ostreae

Binomial name
- Bonamia ostreae Pichot, Comps, Tigé, Grizel & Rabouin, 1980

Species of single-celled organism

Bonamia ostreae is a parasitic rhizarian that can cause lethal infections in shellfish, particularly the European flat oyster, Ostrea edulis. Infection in oysters rarely results in clinical signs of disease and often the only indication of the infection is increased mortality.

== Pathology ==
The cells of Bonamia ostreae measure 2-3 μm in diameter and are found within the haemocytes of the oyster. Lesions occur with focal infiltration of the haemocytes within the connective tissue of the mantle and gills, and in the vascular sinuses near the digestive gland, intestine and stomach. Infection seems to be correlated to haemocyte destruction and diapedesis.

== Epidemiology ==
A study in the Netherlands of the epidemiology of European flat oysters, Ostrea edulis, infected with Bonamia ostreae showed that the parasite was present throughout the year and was detected in all oyster weight classes. The study analyzed the prevalence relative to O. edulis density, biomass and a range of environmental parameters. Prevalence was greatest in the largest oysters and was higher in spring than in the autumn, perhaps because of the mortality of these shellfish during the summer. Mortality seemed to be correlated with higher water temperatures and oysters seemed to be more susceptible to infection after seasons with lower food availability or lower salinity levels.

Genetic research using gene copy numbers for species-specific digital droplet PCR assays indicates that Bonamia ostreae causes more intense infections that Bonamia exitiosa in the New Zealand flat oyster Ostrea chilensis. However, concurrent infections of both Bonamia parasites in O. chilensis were similar in intensity to single-species infections.

The Australian flat oyster, Ostrea angasi, has been infected with two similar Bonamia parasites, Bonamia exitiosa and B. roughleyi.

== Distribution ==
In Europe, distribution of the parasite is along the Atlantic coast from Spain to Denmark. In the USA it is found on the Atlantic coast in Maine and the Pacific coast from California to Washington. B. ostreae is introduced in New Zealand and was first detected in the Marlborough Sounds in 2015, and it has been detected in Big Glory Bay on Stewart Island since 2017.

== Research ==
A study was made in 2001 into the relative susceptibility of different strains of Ostrea edulis to the parasite Bonamia ostreae.

Another study was made in 2004 into the incidence of infection by Bonamia ostrea in different populations of Ostrea edulis.

A study made in 2010 aimed to evaluate the Bonamia spp. infection status of Ostrea stentina in the Mediterranean Sea.

A further study made in 2010 investigated whether the Pacific oyster, Crassostrea gigas, could act as a carrier or a reservoir of Bonamia ostreae and transmit the infection to Ostrea edulis.

Species specific ddPCR assays have been designed and validated for B. ostreae and B. exitiosa and in New Zealand flat oysters for biosecurity and fisheries stock management.
