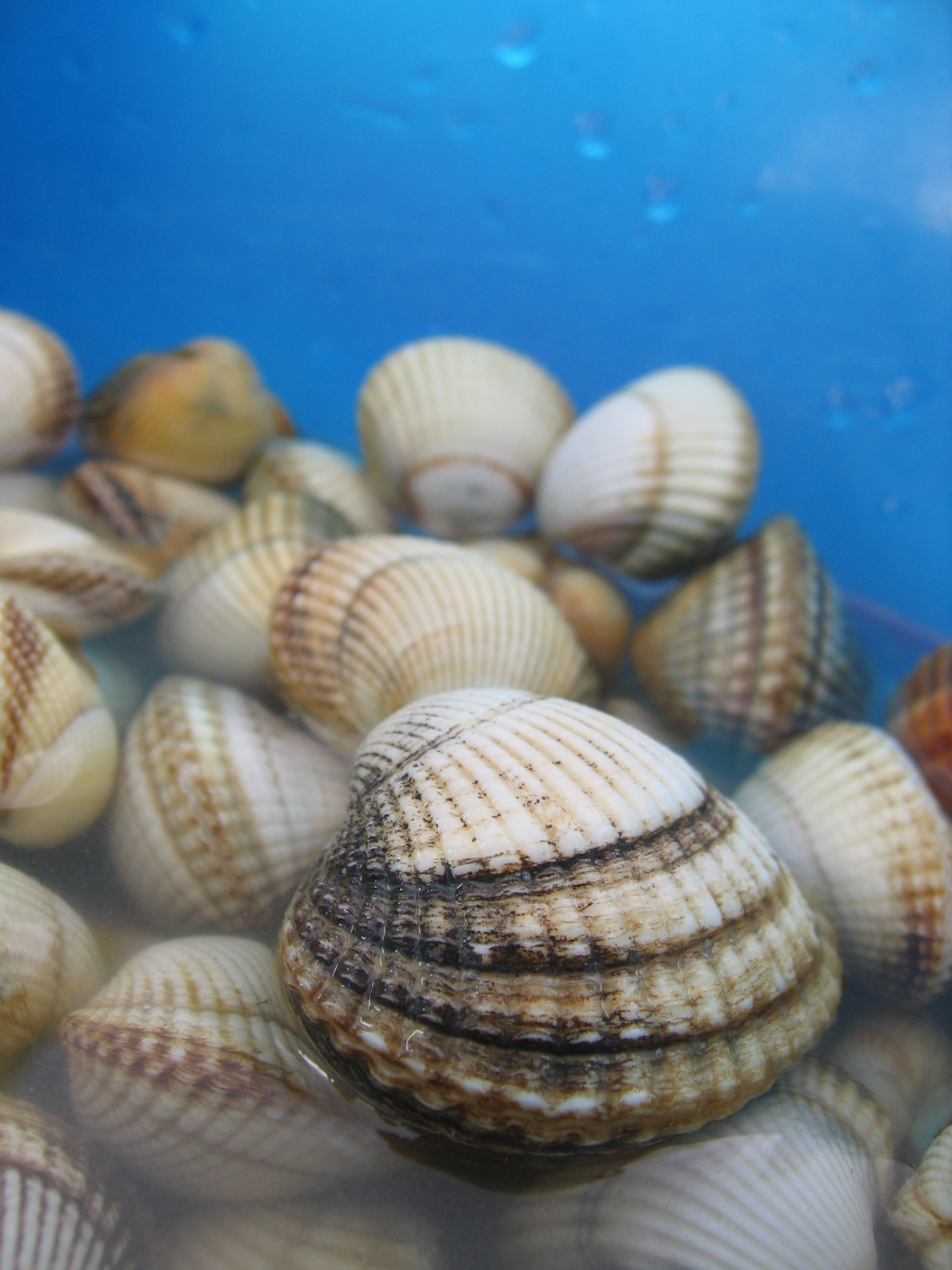

Scientific classification
- Kingdom: Animalia
- Phylum: Mollusca
- Class: Bivalvia
- Order: Cardiida
- Family: Cardiidae
- Genus: Cerastoderma
- Species: C. edule

Binomial name
- Cerastoderma edule (Linnaeus, 1758)

Synonyms
- Cardium belgicum De Malzine, 1867
- Cardium crenulatum Lamarck, 1819
- Cardium edule Linnaeus, 1758 (basionym)
- Cardium edule burchanae Girscher, 1938
- Cardium edule var. batesoni Bucquoy, Dautzenberg & Dollfus, 1892
- Cardium edule var. loppensi Mars, 1951
- Cardium edule var. major Bucquoy, Dautzenberg & Dollfus, 1892
- Cardium mercatorium Coen, 1915
- Cardium nunninkae Lucas, 1984
- Cardium obtritum Locard, 1886
- Cardium quadrarium Reeve, 1845
- Cardium vulgare Da Costa, 1778
- Cerastoderma edule var. sinicola Lacourt, 1974
- Cerastoderma nunninkae Lucas, 1984

= Common cockle =

Species of bivalve

The common cockle (Cerastoderma edule) is a species of edible saltwater clam, a marine bivalve mollusc in the family Cardiidae, the cockles. It is found in waters off Europe, from Iceland in the north, south into waters off western Africa as far south as Senegal. The ribbed oval shells can reach 6 centimetres (2.4 in) across and are white, yellowish or brown in colour. The common cockle is harvested commercially and eaten in much of its range.

== Taxonomy and naming ==
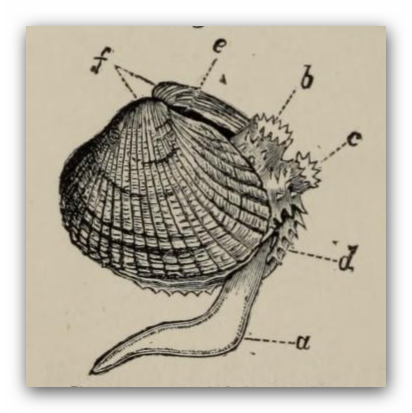
Cerastoderma edule a) foot b) exhalant siphon c) branchial or inhalant siphon d) edge of mantle e) ligament f) umbones or beaks of the shell

The common cockle was one of the many invertebrate species originally described by Carl Linnaeus in the landmark 1758 10th edition of Systema Naturae, where it was given its old binomial name Cardium edule. The species name is derived from the Latin adjective ĕdūlis, 'edible'. Italian naturalist Giuseppe Saverio Poli erected the genus Cerastoderma in 1795, making the common cockle the type species as Cerastoderma edule. The genus name is derived from the Ancient Greek words κέρας (keras, 'horn') and δέρμα (derma, 'skin'). For many years it was referred to by both names.

Other common names in English are edible cockle and common edible cockle. On account of its heart-like shape, it is called the 'heart mussel' in German and Scandinavian languages (Hertzmuschel and hjertemusling, respectively).

== Description ==
It typically reaches from 3.5 centimetres (1.4 in) to 5 cm (2.0 in) in length, but sometimes it reaches 6 cm (2.4 in). The shells are pale or whitish yellow, grubby white, or brown. The shell is oval, and covered by ribs, which are flattened in the middle part of the shell. The digestive glands are light brown to dark green.

In contrast, the similar lagoon cockle has an elongated shell posteriorly, black digestive glands and is found in substrate of stagnant water.

== Distribution and habitat ==
This species is found in coastal areas of the northern and eastern Atlantic Ocean. It is widely distributed from Iceland and Norway in Europe, to Senegal along the coast of west Africa. The common cockle is one of the most abundant species of molluscs in tidal flats located in the bays and estuaries of Europe. It plays a major role as a source of food for crustaceans, fish, and wading birds.

Cerastoderma edule
Right and left valve of the same specimen:

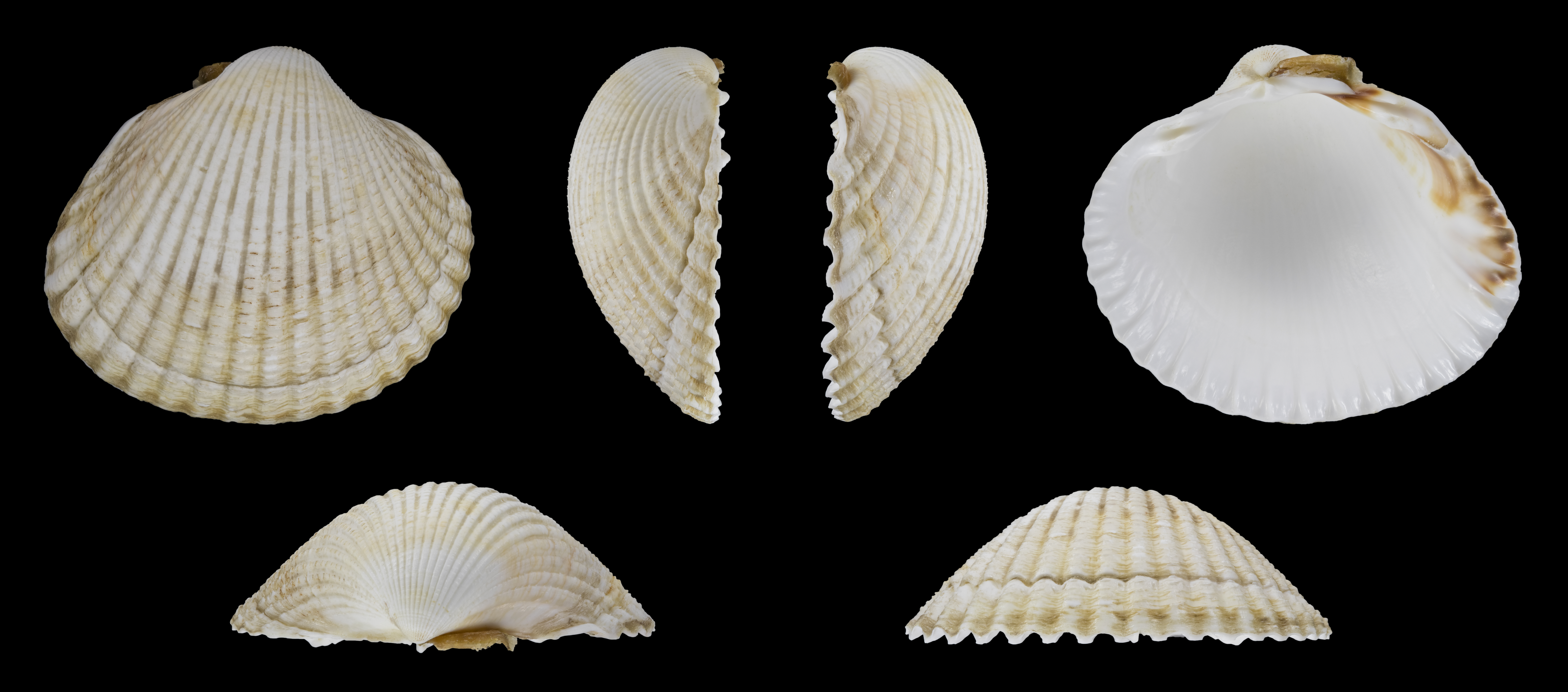
Right valve

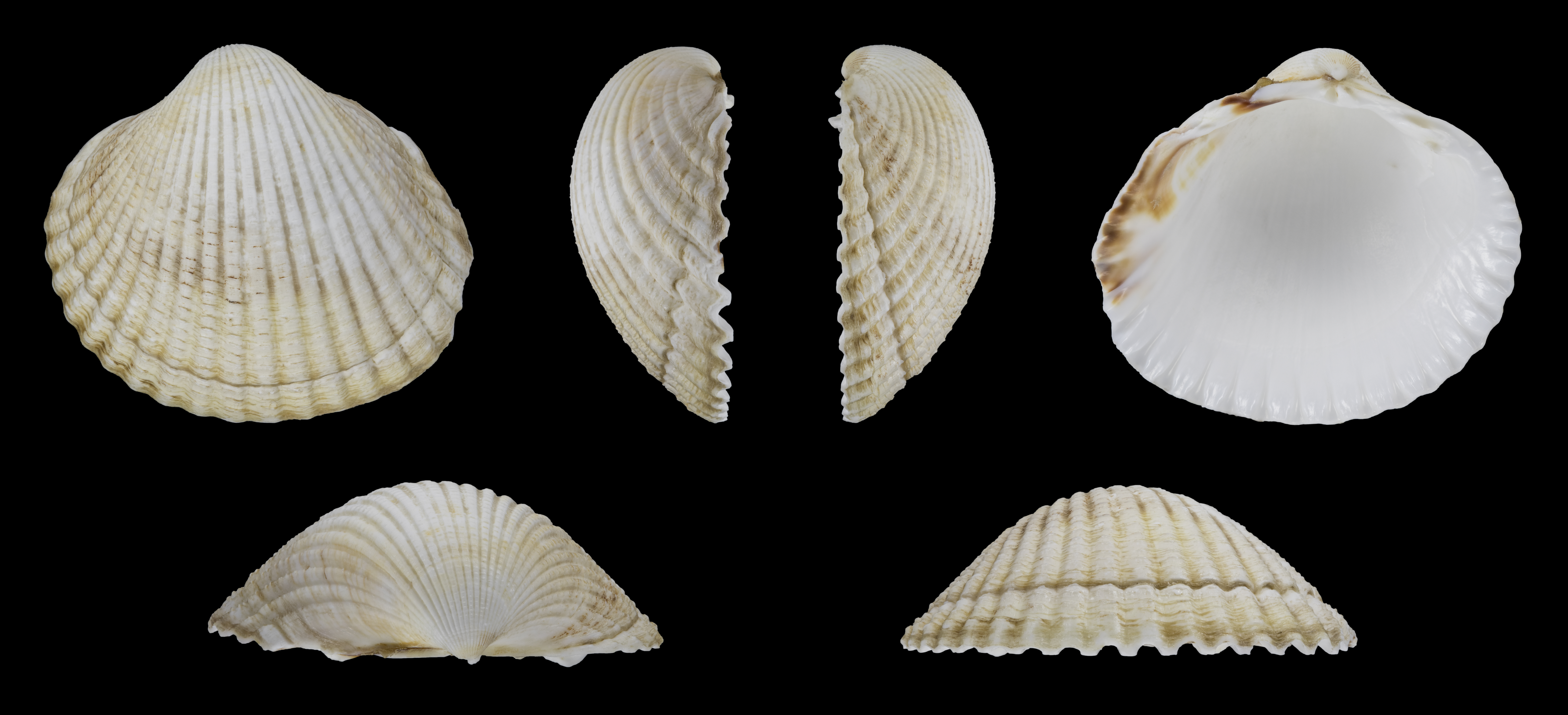
Left valve

Cerastoderma edule var. belgicum
Right and left valve of the same specimen:

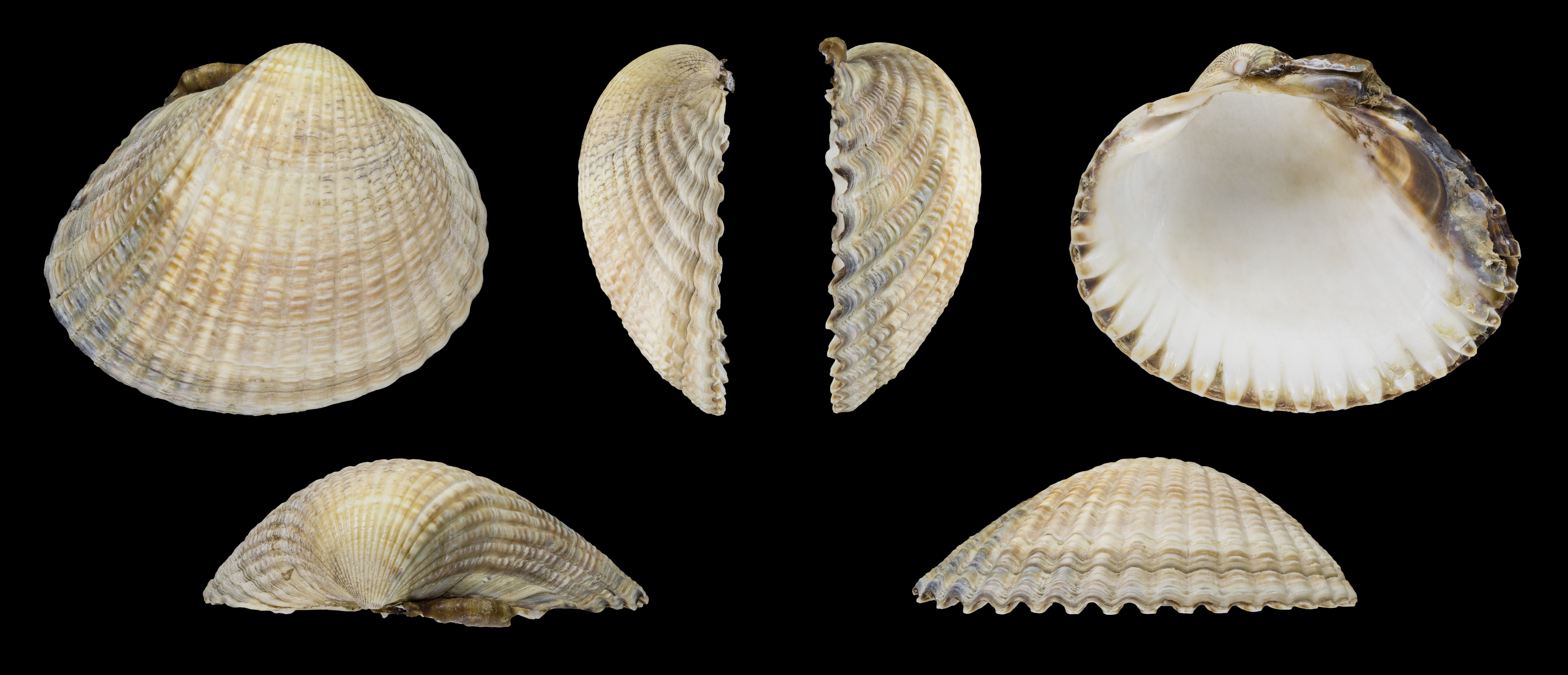
Right valve

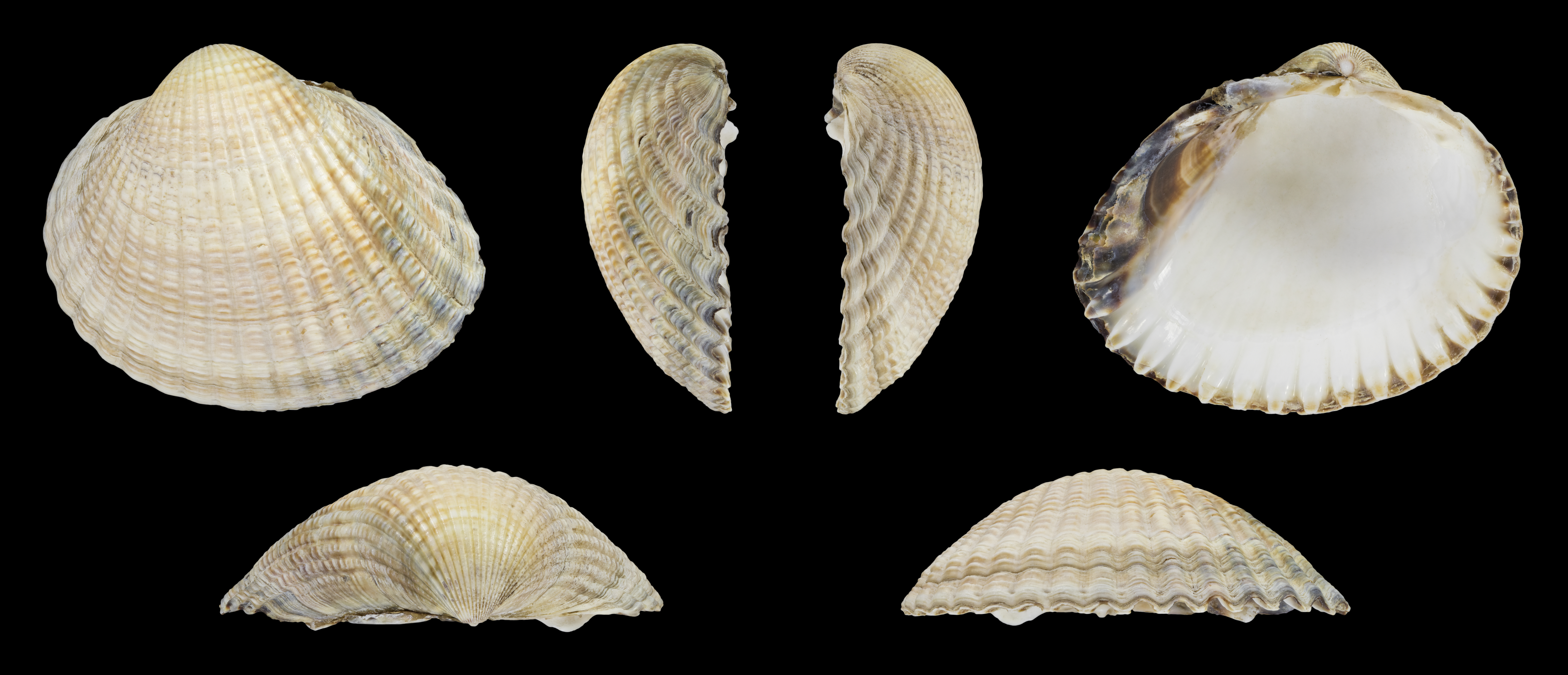
Left valve

Cerastoderma edule var. loppensi
Right and left valve of the same specimen:

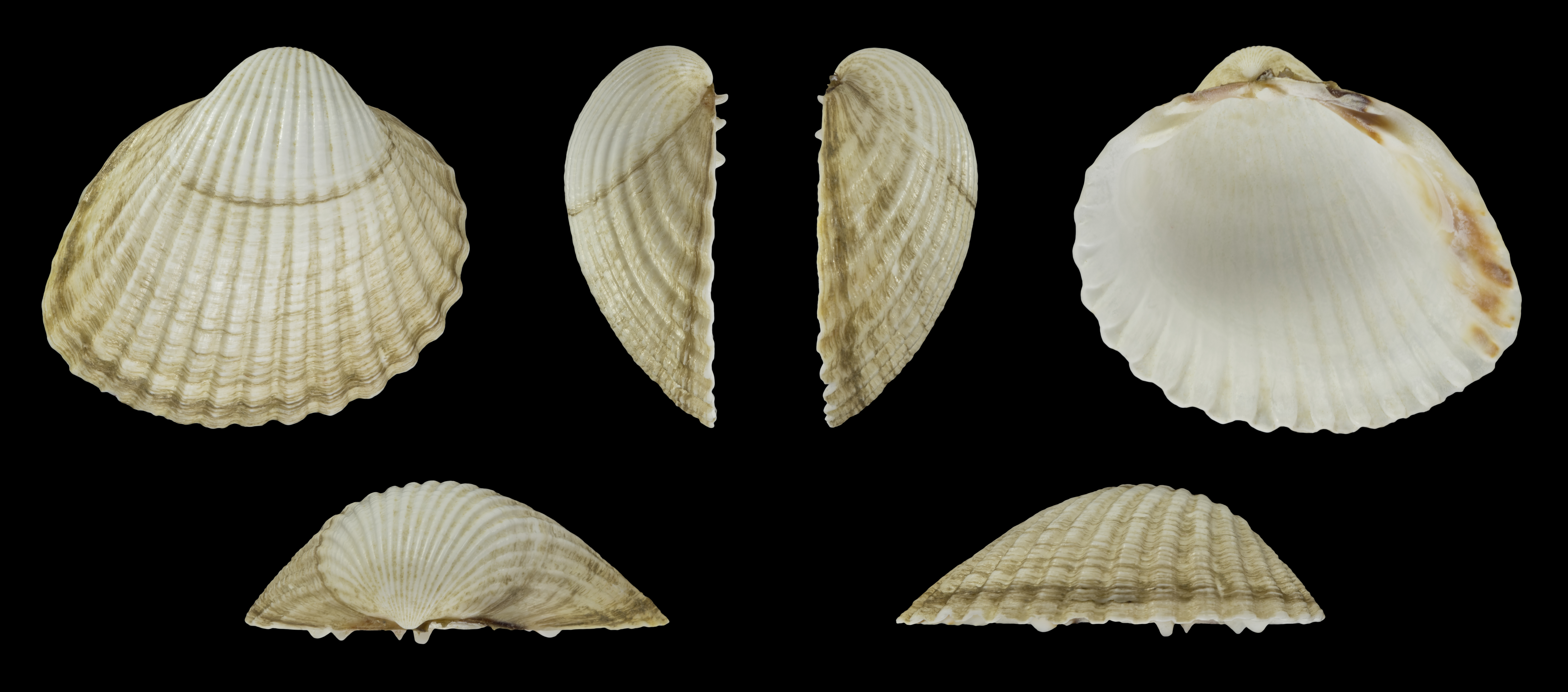
Right valve

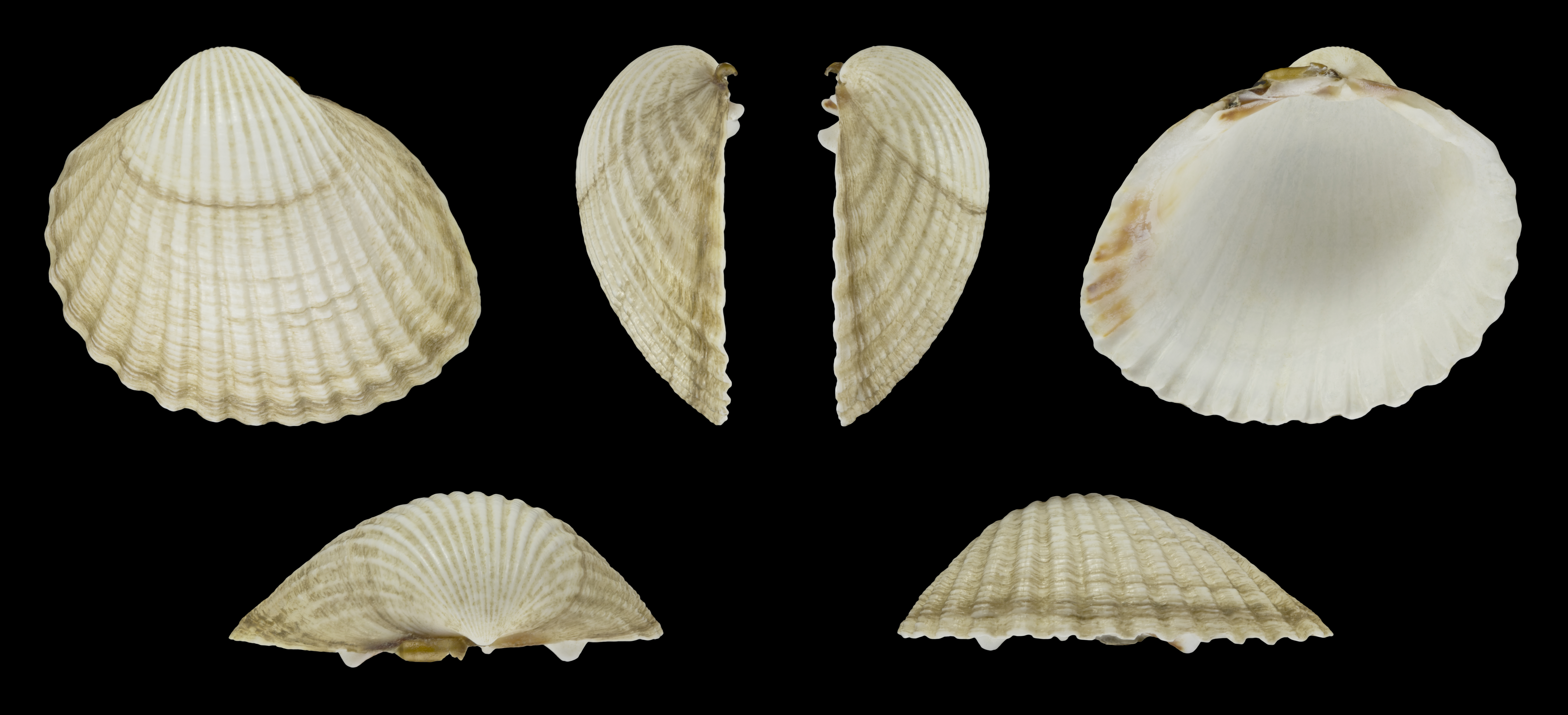
Left valve

Cerastoderma edule var. maculatum
Right and left valve:

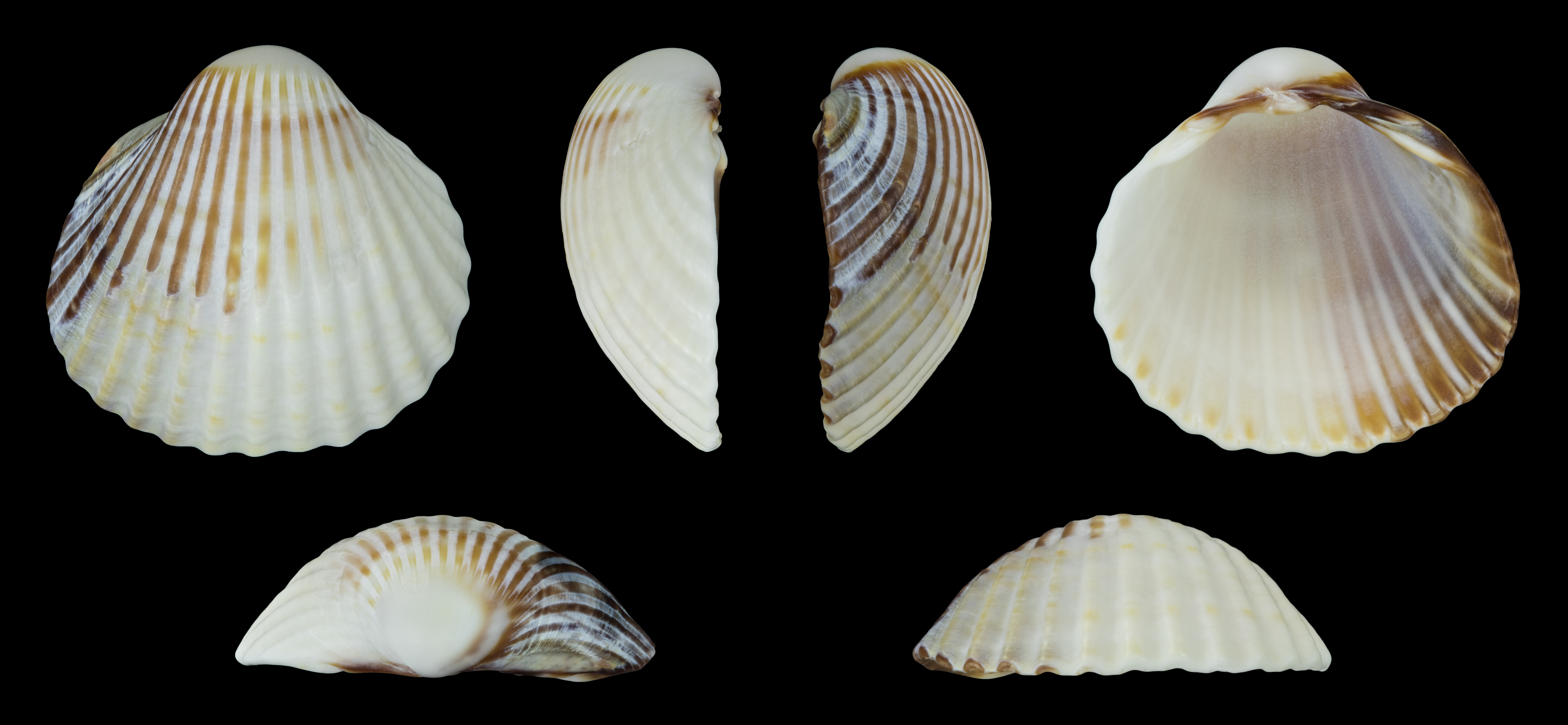
Right valve

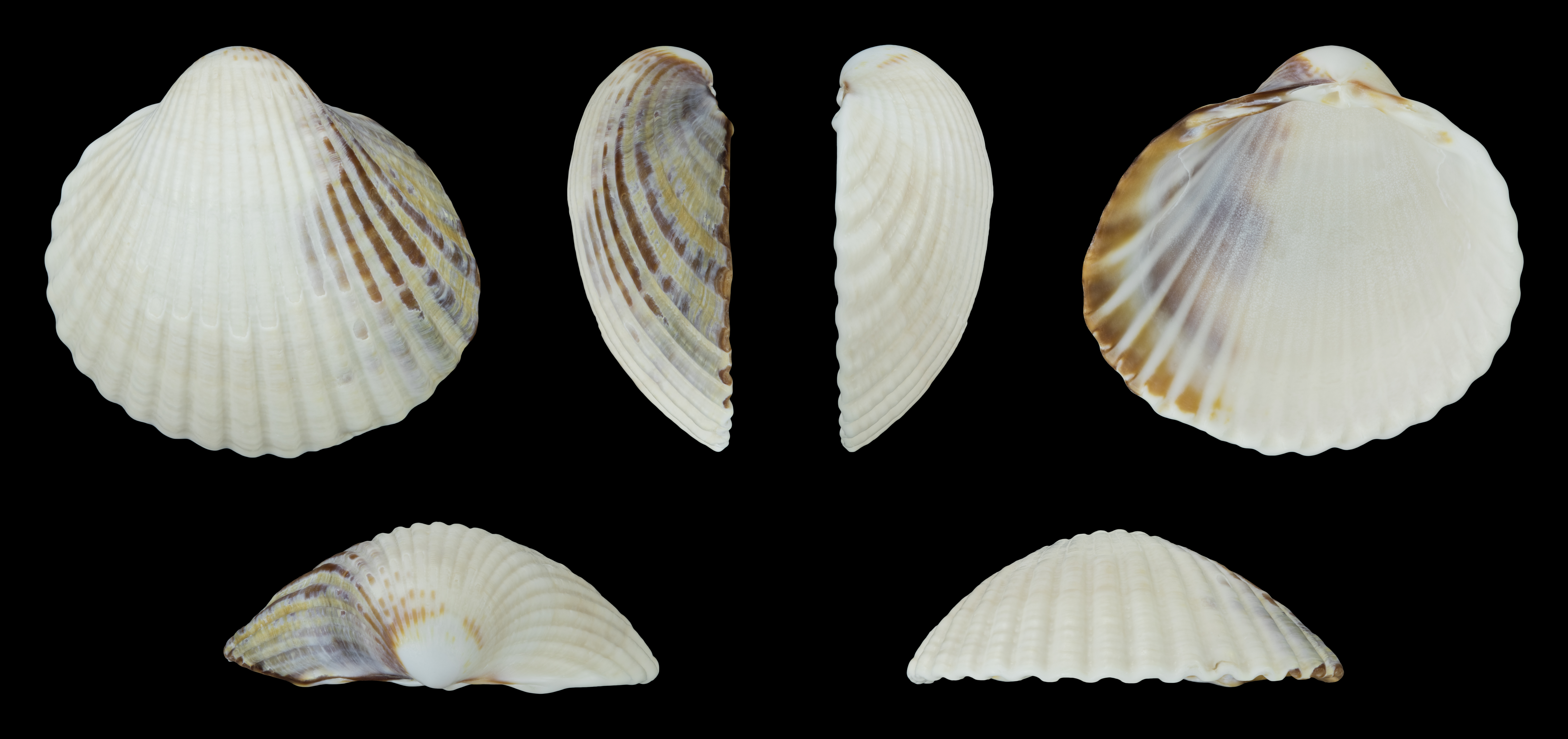
Left valve

== Ecology ==
This species is a filter feeder, meaning that it feeds by straining water to obtain suspended matter and food particles. Water is inhaled through an inhalant siphon, and exhaled through an exhalant siphon.

It tolerates a wide range of salinity (euryhaline), and wide range of temperatures (eurythermic), which helps to explain its very extensive range. It has a first spawning period in early summer, and a second one in the fall.

=== Lifespan and predation ===
Lifespan is typically five to six years, though it may perish earlier due to predation by humans as well as crabs, flounder, and various birds especially including oystercatchers. A green shore crab (Carcinus maenas) can consume up to 40 common cockles a day, eating smaller cockles (under 1.5 cm diameter) much more quickly than larger ones. As cockles size increases it takes exponentially more time for the green crabs to break into the shell. This leads to the crabs preferring smaller cockles as prey. In lean seasons where cockles did not grow so quickly the crabs may have a greater influence on the population due to their preference for smaller individuals.

=== Parasites and diseases ===
The cercozoan species Marteilia cochillia is a parasite of the common cockle, having caused a collapse in commercial harvests of cockle beds in Galicia in 2012. A survey of cockle beds in Galicia found that infestation by the gregarine parasite Nematopsis was widespread, and that the most common pathological finding was disseminated neoplasia.

== Uses ==
These animals were probably a significant food source in hunter-gatherer societies of prehistoric Europe, and the clay remains of shell-imprints have been found. The clay is imprinted with fine decorations, repetitions of the distinct curved ridges, undulating lines and/or edges characteristic to the cockle shell, a natural resource of coastal waters.

=== As food ===
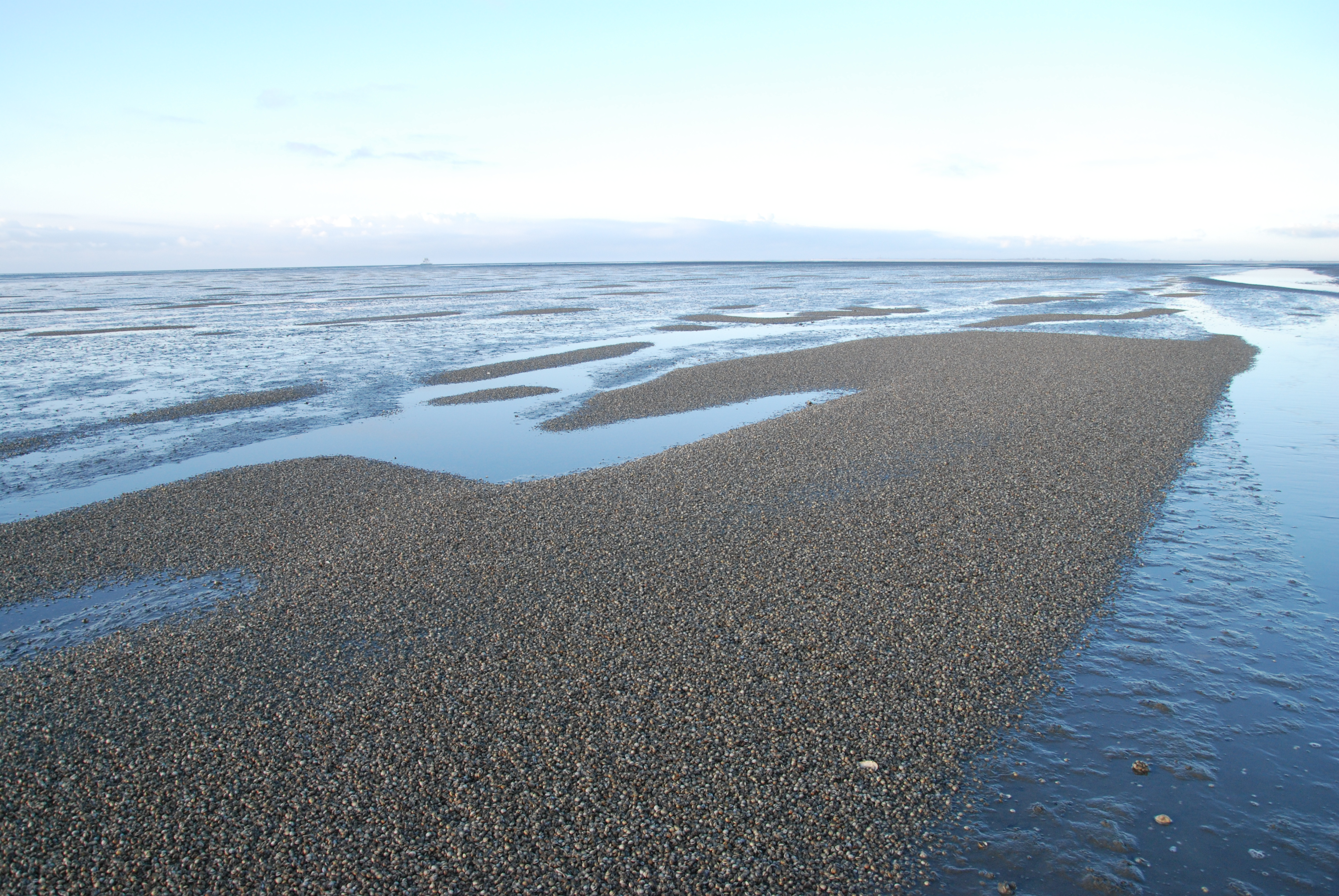
Cockle bed with cockles near De Cocksdorp on the island of Texel in the Dutch province of North Holland

This cockle is eaten in the United Kingdom, France, Germany, Ireland, Japan, Portugal and Spain and elsewhere. It is generally cooked but is also sometimes eaten pickled or raw. In addition to the meat being a food source, their shells have been used industrially as a source of lime.

An important species for the fishing industry, it is commercially fished in the United Kingdom, Ireland and France by suction dredge and also raking by hand. Previously the greatest catch was from the Netherlands, but now restrictions have been put in place due to environmental concerns. Similar measures have been established elsewhere, for example in Scotland where dredging using vehicles is prohibited, and in parts of England and Wales where only old-fashioned hand-gathering is permitted (using a long plank that is rocked back and forth on the sand). In 2004, the incoming tide at Morecambe Bay in England caused 23 cockle-gatherers to die.

This species is also used in aquaculture in the UK, the Netherlands and Portugal. However, production has not been stable; for example, production fell from 107,800 tons in 1987 to 40,900 tons in 1997.

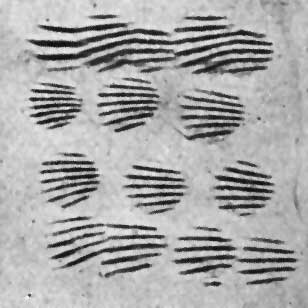
Cockle shell ridges imprinted in fragment of Neolithic Cardial ware

== In culture ==
Cardial ware is the name of the Neolithic pottery from maritime cultures that colonized Mediterranean shores c. 6000 – 5,500 BC, this name being based upon the old binomial name of the species: Cardium edule.

In the 1800s, a song called "Molly Malone" was first published (also known as "Cockles and Mussels"), later becoming the unofficial song of Dublin, Ireland. The lyrics describe Molly Malone selling the common cockle in the streets of that city.
