= Bonamia (protist) =

Scientific classification
- Domain: Eukaryota
- Clade: Sar
- Clade: Rhizaria
- Phylum: Endomyxa
- Class: Ascetosporea
- Order: Haplosporida
- Family: Haplosporiidae
- Genus: Bonamia; Pichot, Comps, Tigé, Grizel & Rabouin, 1980

Genus of protists

Bonamia is a genus of protists belonging to the family Haplosporiidae.

The genus has cosmopolitan distribution.

Species:

- Bonamia exitiosa Hine, Cochennac & Berthe, 2001
- Bonamia ostreae Pichot, Comps, Tigé, Grizel & Rabouin, 1980
- Bonamia perspora Carnegie, Burreson, Hine, Stokes, Audemard, Bishop & Peterson, 2006
- Bonamia roughleyi (Farley, Wolf & Elston, 1988)
