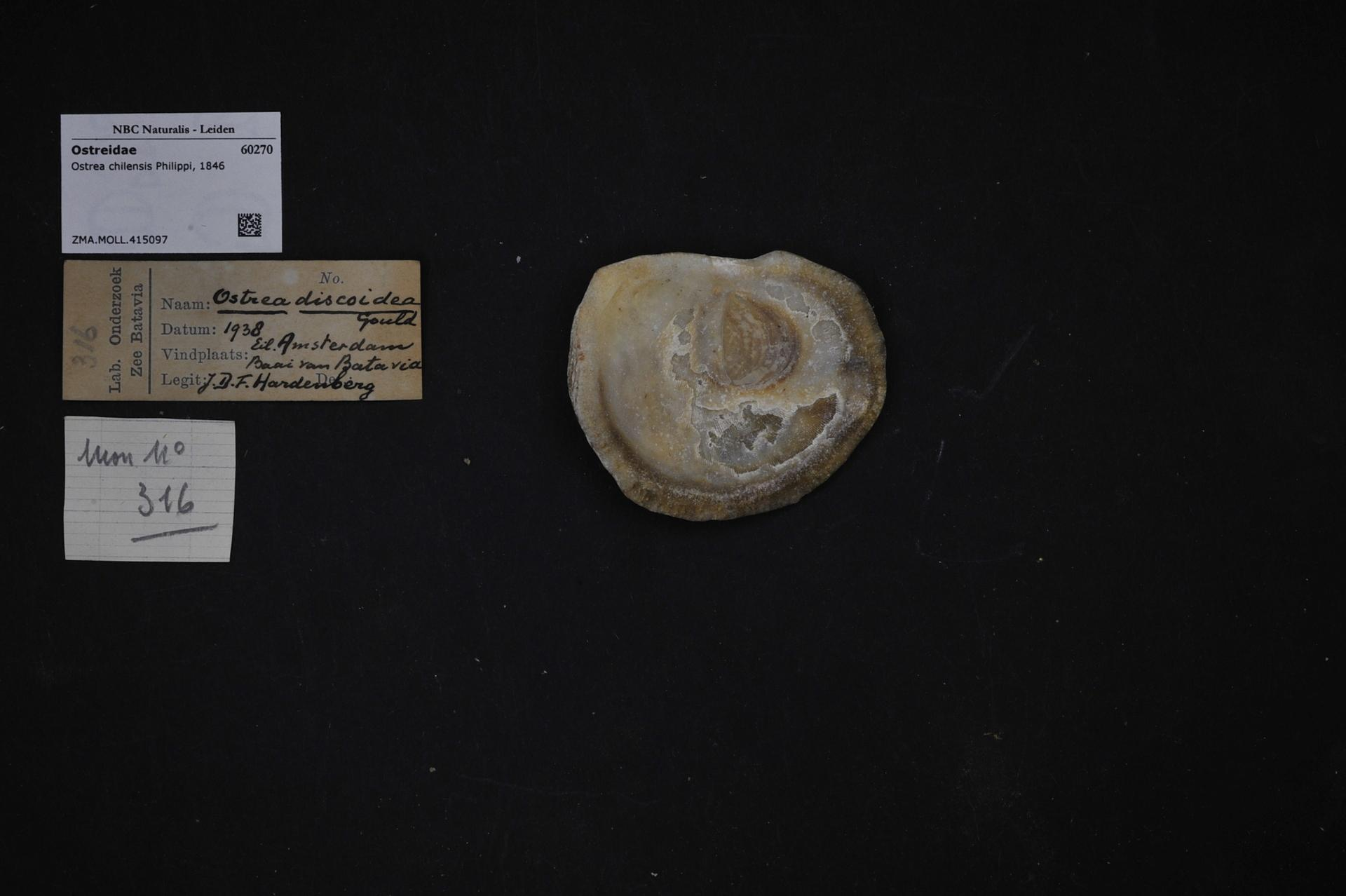
- Museum specimen of the shell of Ostrea chilensis

Scientific classification
- Kingdom: Animalia
- Phylum: Mollusca
- Class: Bivalvia
- Order: Ostreida
- Family: Ostreidae
- Genus: Ostrea
- Species: O. chilensis

Binomial name
- Ostrea chilensis Küster, 1844

Synonyms
- Crassostrea chilensis (Küster, 1844); Crassostrea discoidea (Gould, 1850); Crassostrea nelsoniana (Zittel, 1865); Ostraea angasi var. digitata Lamy, 1929; Ostraea chiloensis G. B. Sowerby II, 1871; Ostrea callichroa Hanley, 1846; Ostrea charlottae Finlay, 1928; Ostrea cibialis Hupé in Gay, 1854; Ostrea corrugata Hutton, 1873; Ostrea discoidea Gould, 1850; Ostrea fococarens Finlay, 1928; Ostrea hefferdi Finlay, 1928; Ostrea huttoni Lamy, 1929; Ostrea longiuscula Hupé in Gay, 1854; Ostrea lutaria Hutton, 1873; Ostrea nelsoniana Zittel, 1865; Ostrea vinolenta Hupé in Gay, 1854; Tiostrea chilensis (Küster, 1844); Tiostrea lutaria (Hutton, 1873)

= Dredge oyster =

Species of bivalve

The dredge oyster, Bluff oyster or Chilean oyster (Ostrea chilensis), is also known in Chile as ostra verde, is a species of flat oyster. It is a marine bivalve mollusc of the family Ostreidae.

== Distribution ==
This species is native to Chile and New Zealand.

In Chile, its range limit is from Chiloé Island, Los Lagos region to Guaitecas Islands, Aysén region. Practically, nowadays it only exists in the wild in one natural bank, Pullinque, a sector located in the Quetalmahue Gulf of Ancud which was declared a genetic reserve in 1982, and as a marine reserve in 2003.

In the 1960s, the species was deliberately introduced to the Menai Strait off Wales by the Fisheries Laboratory, Conwy. This was an experiment to determine if the oyster could be an alternative to the native Ostrea edulis oysters in fisheries. The species was found to be unsuitable because of low recruitment and vulnerability to parasites and pathogens, and the experiment was abandoned. A self-sustaining population of O. chilensis remains, and has spread to other areas of the Menai Strait; it is regarded as an invasive species.

== Habitat ==
This bivalve is found from low tide to depths of up to 35 m. In Chile it lives attached to hard rocky or muddy bottoms, from intertidal to about 8 meters deep, in enclosed bays or areas protected from strong waves.

== Description ==
Its length is up to 105 mm, width up to 70 mm, and inflation up to 33 mm. In Chile its maximum controlled length is 87 mm.

== Ecology ==
In New Zealand, the species is infected by two haplosporidian parasites, Bonamia exitiosa and B. ostreae. B. ostreae has been detected in O. chilensis across most of the oyster's range in New Zealand, from the Hauraki Gulf in the north to Port Adventure in southern South Island. B. ostreae is introduced in New Zealand and was first detected O. chilensis in the Marlborough Sounds in 2015, and it has been detected in Big Glory Bay on Stewart Island since 2017.

== Commercial importance ==
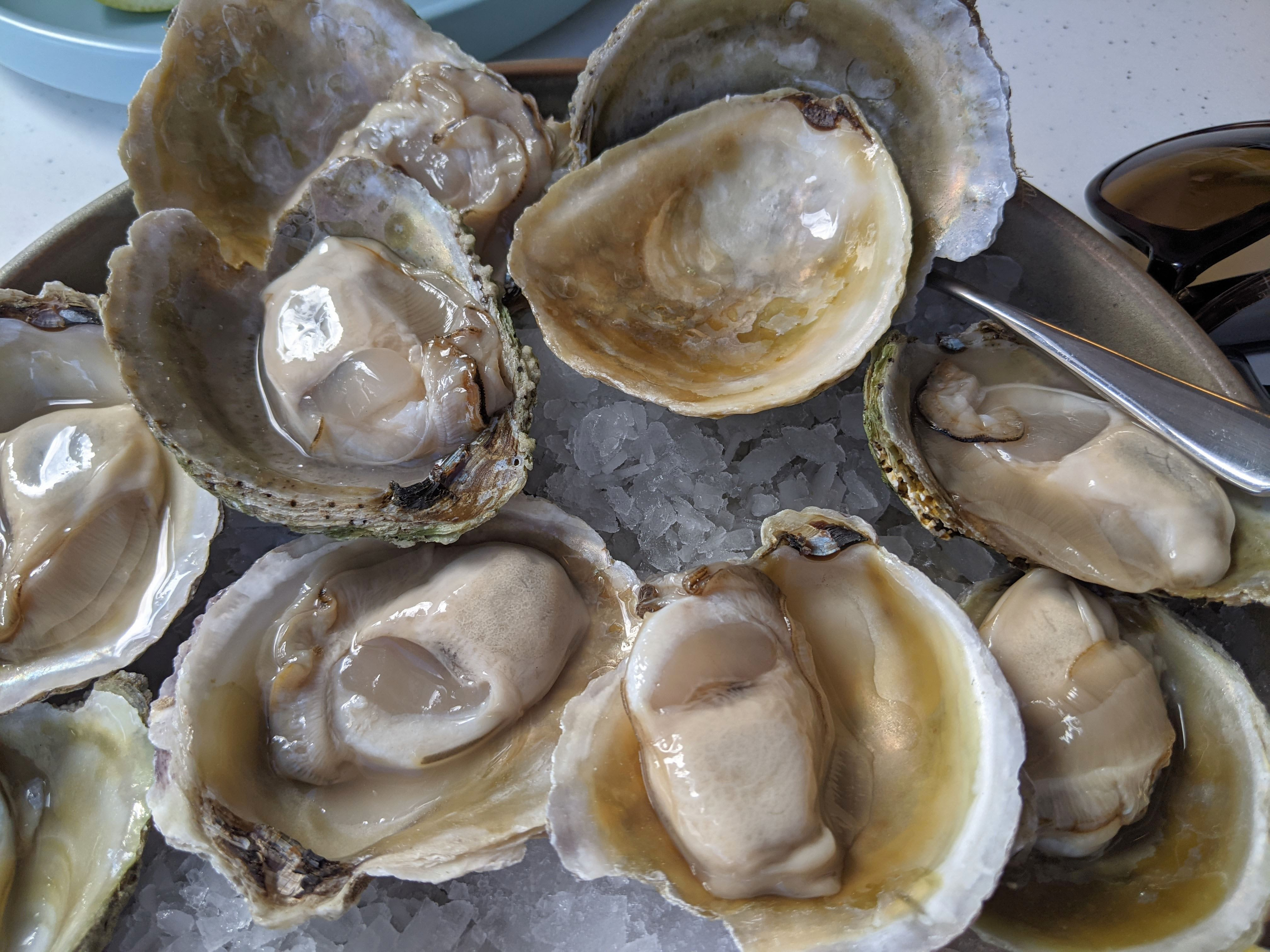
Bluff oysters served on ice

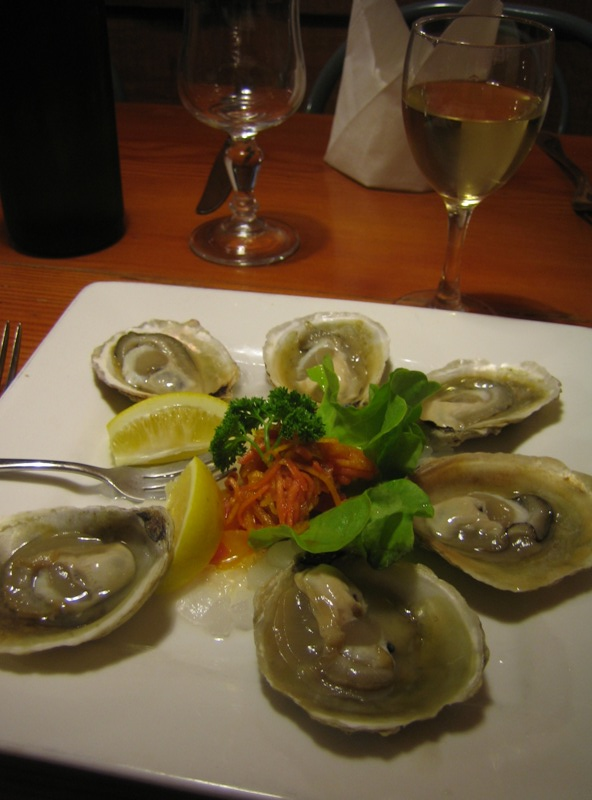
Bluff oysters at a restaurant

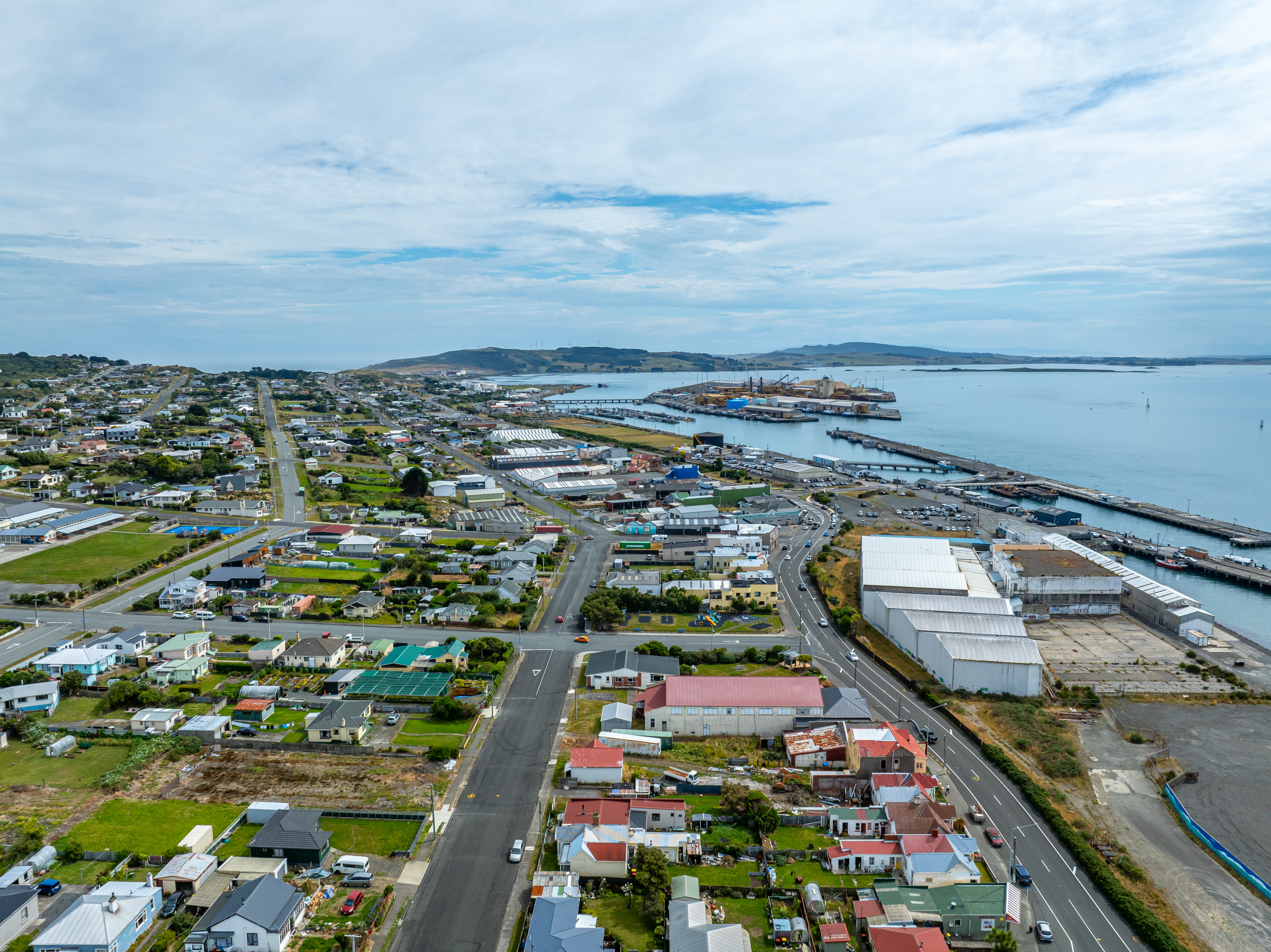
Aerial view of the fishing town of Bluff, New Zealand, from which the oyster gets its local name

In New Zealand, they are a prized delicacy, and harvested from March to August from the Foveaux Strait oyster fishery, which centres on the town of Bluff (hence the local name). From the early 1980s, the fishery went into serious decline, due to the outbreak of an oyster parasite, Bonamia exitiosa, with the disease killing an estimated billion oysters between 2000 and 2003. The population has been recovering since 2003, with fishermen voluntarily limiting the catch to half the allowable to aid the revival.

In Chile, it has been harvested by the fishermen of Chiloé Island since ancient times, but the written and photographic information dates back to the mid-1800s. As Chile is the longest country in the world, the transportation of the harvested oysters by wooden-made ships, or by early trains in the early 1900s from the south (42°S) to the port of Valparaíso, and then to the capital, Santiago, was complex; however, it got solved when the oysters were placed in barrels that were grated and jointed by quila, a kind of bamboo, and then filled with seawater. The trip lasted half a month. In the city of Ancud, Chiloé Island, the extraction of the oyster was banned even at that time (as in 1869 and then in 1874) due to its overexploitation, on the other hand its sale brought thousands of barrels, boxes and sacks of oysters to the capital to supply its great demand. The oysters was even kept in ponds for growing by Frenchmen, first by Mr. Choloux in Lechagua, Ancud, 1874 and later by the Solminihac family, formally with a concession in Quetalmahue, city of Ancud, in 1915. A couple of years later, in 1935, the Pullinque Oyster Station was built in Pullinque to try to cultivate the Chilean oyster, initiative that proved to be successful because it could provide with seeds for growth to other aquaculture centers that emerged during the agrarian reform period. The economy of Chilean oysters was severely hurt when the most powerful earthquake recorded happened in Valdivia, 1960 because the Pullinque Oyster Station was destroyed by it. Hence, the Corfo institution tried to bring-in the Pacific oyster, but the intention was not recommended by the consulted experts, a decision that was respected by the national government. After the agrarian reform the commercial aquaculture started in the 80s, during the Civic-military dictatorship of Chile, according to FAO, since producers that were state-managed passed to be privately regulated, and also because many exotic species were tentative to introduce as culture options. Nowadays, its culture is successful in Chile with considerable tons exported, and consumed in some places and restaurants.

== Other ==
Changes in river flows in Southland, due to farming and especially power generation, carrying less limestone deposits into the Strait, is therefore believed to have caused an increase in susceptibility to Bonamia, as well as lower growth rates for some seasons in the past, but little evidence supports this and it seems only coincidental.

Flawed discards practices in Chile during the 1890s of the small oysters ended up killing some oyster banks in Ancud. Particularly in Corona lighthouse and Quetalmahue Gulf; as the turbulence generated by the falling oysters resuspended the bottom sand, creating hypoxia conditions that did not allow the bivalves to breathe.

Its Māori name is tio para.
