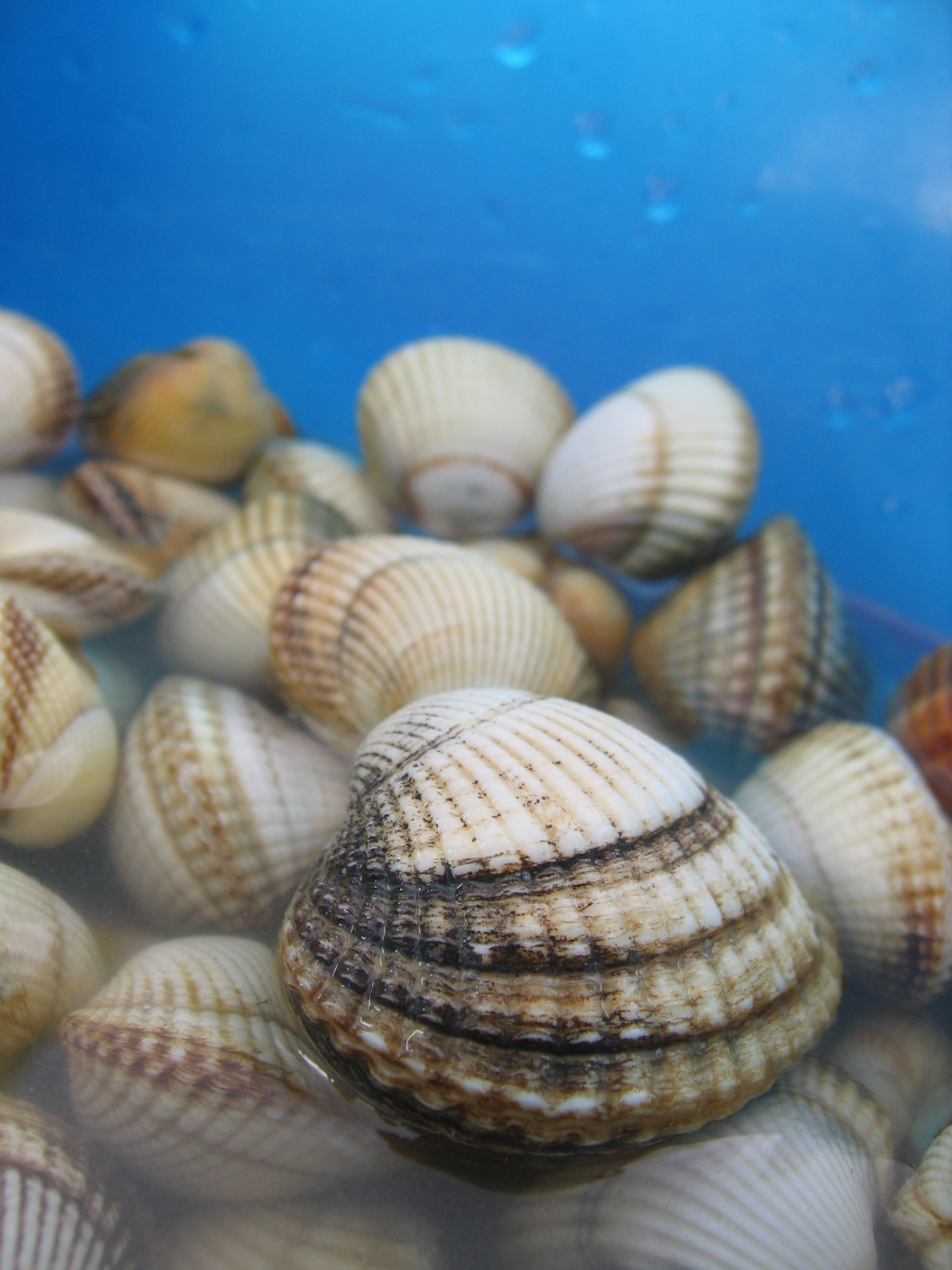
- Common cockle Cerastoderma edule

Scientific classification
- Kingdom: Animalia
- Phylum: Mollusca
- Class: Bivalvia
- Order: Cardiida
- Family: Cardiidae
- Genus: Cerastoderma; Poli, 1795

Type species
- Cardium edule Linnaeus, 1758

Species
- See text

= Cerastoderma =

Cerastoderma Temporal range: Paleocene - Recent

Genus of bivalves

Cerastoderma is a genus of marine bivalves in the family Cardiidae. It includes the common cockle Cerastoderma edule.

== Fossil records ==
This genus is known in the fossil records from the Paleocene to the Quaternary (age range: from 58.7 to 0.012 million years ago).

== Species ==
Extant species:

- Cerastoderma edule (Linnaeus, 1758) - common cockle
- Cerastoderma glaucum (Poiret, 1789) - lagoon cockle

(= Cerastoderma lamarcki [Reeve, 1845])

Fossil taxa:

- Cardium (Cerastoderma) calvertensium Glenn, 1904 †
- Cardium (Cerastoderma) patuxentium Glenn, 1904 †
- Cardium (Cerastoderma) waltonianum Dall, 1900 †
- Cerastoderma chipolanum Dall, 1900 †
- Cerastoderma latisulcum †
- Cerastoderma vindobonensis †

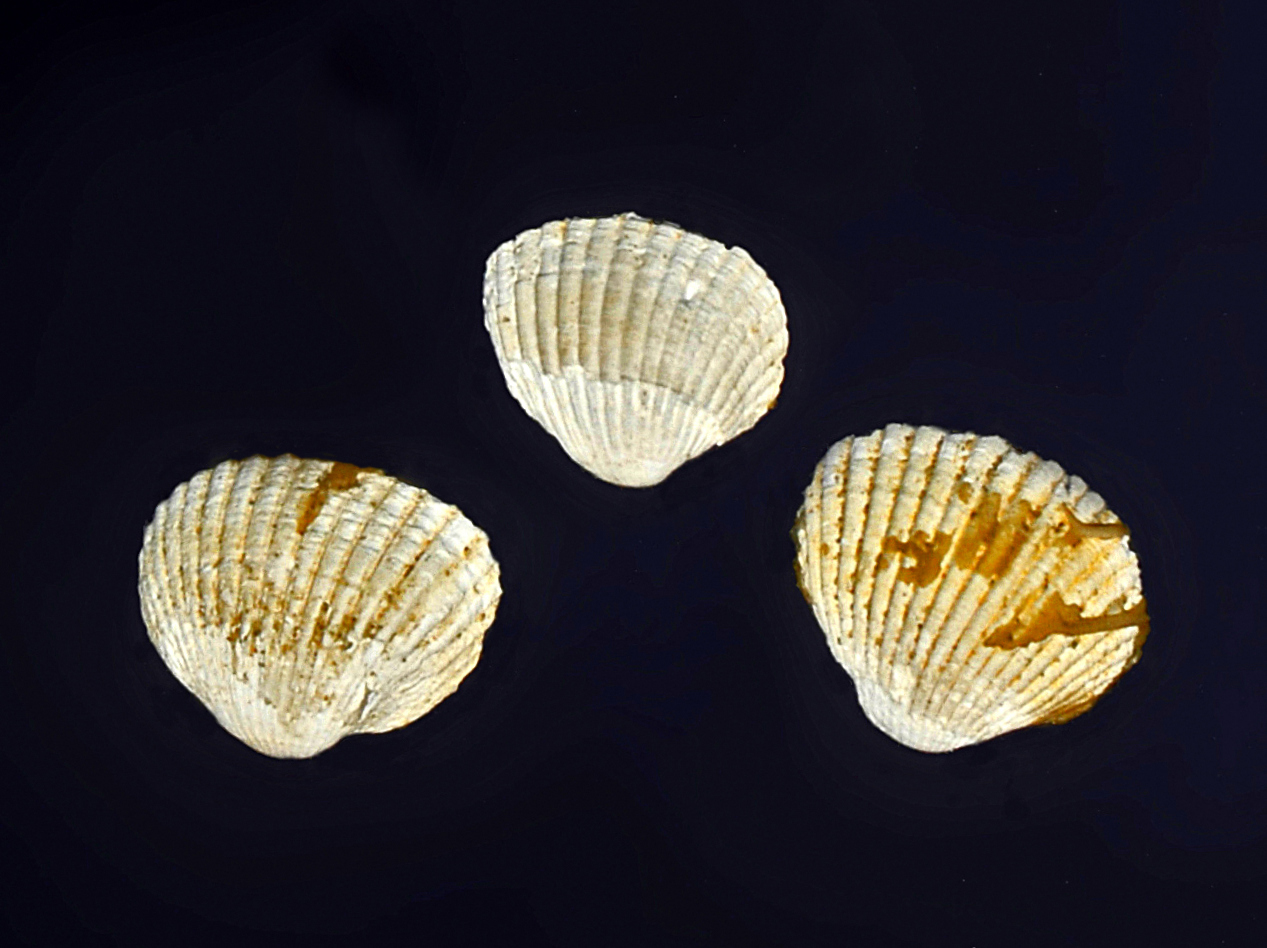
Fossil valves of Cerastoderma edule from Pliocene of Italy
