= Marteilia =

Scientific classification
- Domain: Eukaryota
- Clade: Diaphoretickes
- Clade: SAR
- Clade: Rhizaria
- Phylum: Endomyxa
- Class: Ascetosporea
- Order: Paramyxida
- Family: Marteiliidae
- Genus: Marteilia; Grizel et al., 1974

Synonyms
- Marteilioides Comps, Park & Desportes 1986

Genus of single-celled organisms

Marteilia is a protozoan genus of organisms that are parasites of bivalves. It causes QX disease in Sydney rock oysters and Aber disease in European flat oysters. After being infected by Marteilia, bivalves lose pigmentation in their visceral tissue, and become emaciated (Carrasco, Green, & Itoh, 2015).

== History ==
In the late 1960s and early 1970s, there was a huge decline in European flat oyster (Ostrea edulis) population in Brittany, France. This had a huge socioeconomic impact in Europe. Marteilia refringens was discovered to be the cause of this decline in oyster (Grizel et al., 1974). Around the same time, Marteilia sydneyi was also found to be causing mortalities in Sydney rock oyster (Saccostrea glomerate) in Australia (Perkins & Wolf, 1976).

There has been some success in breeding strains of Sydney rock oyster that are resistant to Marteilia ('QX disease'). However, the disease remains a threat to commercial cultivation of these oysters. It all but destroyed the industry in the Georges River estuary in 1994, spreading to the Hawkesbury River estuary in 2004, and has caused widespread oyster mortality in Port Stephens, as recently as 2021-2022. Selective breeding has recently incorporated lines of wild oysters from the Richmond River, an estuary long ago affected by QX disease, which have a naturally developed QX-resistance.

== Morphology ==
Marteilia has a very peculiar morphology. The outermost cell is the primary cell. Within the primary cell, there is a nucleus and between 3 and 16 secondary cells. Within a secondary cell, there is a nucleus and between 1 and 6 spores. Within each spore, there is a nucleus and another spore, which has yet another nucleus and spore within. This spore within a spore within a spore is termed a tricellular spore. Marteilia has tricellular spores where as the similar genera Paramarteilia and Paramyxa have bicellular and tetracellular spores respectively (Feist, Hine, Bateman, Stentiford, & Longshaw, 2009).

== Cell cycle ==
Marteilia’s morphology is derived from its unique cell cycle. The primary cell undergoes mitosis and produces the secondary cell within the primary cell rather than outside the primary cell. The secondary cell then undergoes mitosis to produce more secondary cells. After reaching a certain number of secondary cells, each secondary cell then undergoes mitosis to produce a spore within itself. The spores undergo a series of endogenous mitosis until it becomes a tricellular spore (Feist, Hine, Bateman, Stentiford, & Longshaw, 2009).

== Life cycle ==
Marteilia begins its life cycle by infecting the gills of bivalves. At the gills, it undergoes sporogony where it replicates endogenously, producing secondary cells. Marteilia then enters the haemolymph and is transported then to the host's digestive tubule. Once there, it attaches itself to the digestive tubule epithelium and undergoes sporulation. After producing many spores, Marteilia enters its final stage and ruptures, releasing the spores. Currently, changes to Marteilia spores after release are unknown but it is assumed that some eventually reach another host's gills and repeat its cycle in its new host. (Kleeman, Adlard, & Lester, 2002)

== Marteilia species ==
- Marteilia christenseni Comps 1985
- Marteilia chungmuensis (Comps, Park & Desportes 1986) Feist et al. 2009
- Marteilia cochillia Carrasco et al. 2013: a species that infects the cockle Cerastoderma edule (Carrasco et al., 2013)
- Marteilia granula Itoh et al. 2014: a species that infects the Manila clam Ruditapes philippinarum (Itoh et al., 2014)
- Marteilia lengehi Comps 1976
- Marteilia maurini Comps, Pichot & Papagianni 1992
- Marteilia octospora Ruiz et al. 2016: a species that infects the Grooved Razor Shell clam Solen marginatus (Ruiz, López, Lee, Rodríguez, & Darriba, 2016)
- Marteilia pararefringens Bass, Stentiford & Kerr 2017: a species that infects the Blue mussel Mytilus edulis (Kerr et al., 2018)
- Marteilia refringens Grizel et al. 1974: a species that infects the European flat oyster Ostrea edulis (Grizel et al., 1974)
- Marteilia sydneyi Perkins & Wolf 1976: a species that infects the Sydney rock oyster Saccostrea glomerata (Perkins & Wolf, 1976)
- Marteilia tapetis Kang et al. 2019
