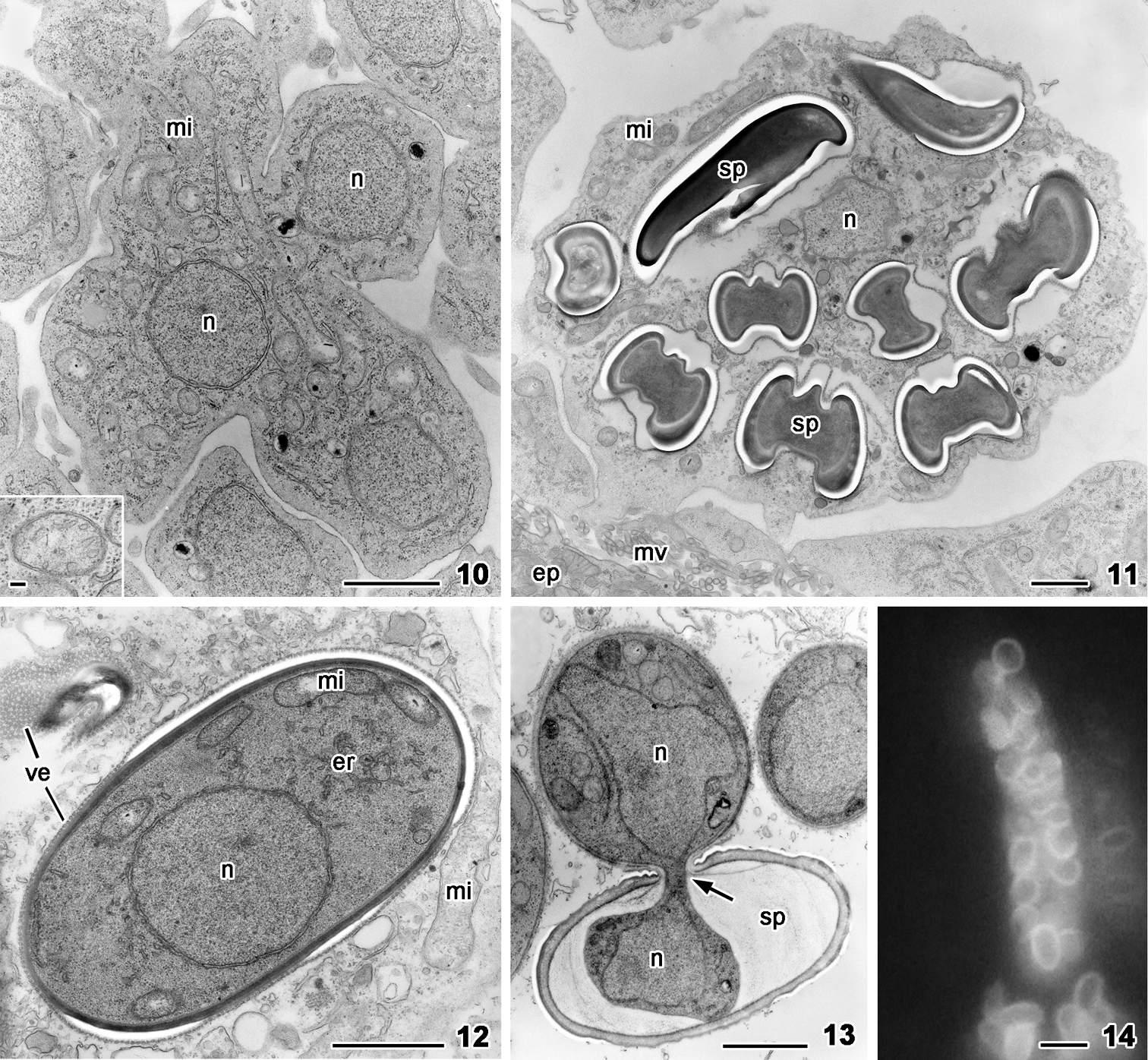
- Nephridiophaga blattellae, 10–13 transmission electron microscopy, 14 Calcofluor white staining. 10 Meront with several nuclei (n) and mitochondria (mi) in the lumen of Malpighian tubule. Inset: Mitochondrium with tubular to sac-like cristae. 11 Sporogenic plasmodium containing mature spores (sp), mitochondria (mi), and vegetative nuclei (n) in the cytoplasm. The plasmodium is anchored to the microvilli (mv) of epithelial cells (ep) of the tubule. 12 Young spore within the cytoplasm of a sporogenic plasmodium, surrounded by a layer of vesicles. The spore cytoplasm contains one nucleus (n), mitochondria (mi), and endoplasmic reticulum (er). 13 An infectious sporoplasm hatches through the central spore opening, leaving behind the spore wall of the emptying spore (sp). The nucleus (n) is squeezed through the tiny spore opening. 14 Calcofluor white stains the spore wall indicating the presence of chitin (bluish color). Scale bars: 1 µm (10–13), inset 0.1 µm (10), 5 µm (14)

Scientific classification
- Kingdom: Fungi
- Division: Chytridiomycota
- Class: Chytridiomycetes
- Order: Nephridiophagales
- Family: Nephridiophagaceae
- Genus: Nephridiophaga; Ivanić 1937

Type species
- Nepharidiophaga apis Ivanic 1937

Synonyms
- Coelosporidium Mesnil & Marchoux 1897

= Nephridiophaga =

Genus of fungi

Nephridiophaga is a genus of single cell eukaryotes, now considered to be fungi, that pathogenically inhabit the Malpighian tubules of insects. Ivanic described the type species from honey bees.

== Morphology and life cycle ==
Nephridiophaga spores are small, flattened ovals that resemble a red blood cell. Each spore contains a single nucleus and may have an inconspicuous, central opening. Spores are ingested by insects. Once inside the host, spores germinate, though whether in the gut or elsewhere is not known. Plasmodia inhabit and feed on Malpighian tubule cells where they are in direct contact with the cytoplasm. Multi-nucleate plasmodia are eventually released into the lumen, some attach to the brush border of the tubule cells using pseudopodia that interdigitate with the microvilli of the cells. Other plasmodia form merozoite-like cells. Plasmodia released into the lumen form sporoblasts internally with a spore wall enclosing each nucleus. Sporoblasts can be asexual or sexual. Asexual sporoblasts are formed from a type of closed mitosis with chromosomes un-condensed and spindle poles remaining un-connected to the nuclear envelope, which is a common form of mitosis for fungi. Sexual sporoblasts are formed after the fusion of meiotic nuclei; however, the details of meiosis and fusion are not known, and the phenomenon is doubted by some authors. Spores are excreted from the insect in its feces.

== Taxonomy ==
Nephridiophaga was originally placed in the protist order Haplosporidia, though not all researchers agreed, with some placing it in the Microsporidia, and others leaving it unclassified. Molecular phylogenetic studies of species infecting cockroaches have shown that the genus belongs in or close to the Chytrid division of the kingdom Fungi.

== Species ==
Based on

- Nephridiophaga apis Ivanić 1937
- Nephridiophaga archimandrita Radek, Wellmanns & Wolf 2011
- Nephridiophaga blaberi Radek & Storch 2000
- Nephridiophaga blatellae (Crawley 1905) Woolever 1966
- Nephridiophaga forficulae (Léger 1909) Ormières & Manier 1973
- Nephridiophaga lucihormetica Radek, Wellmanns & Wolf 2011
- Nephridiophaga maderae Radek et al. 2017
- Nephridiophaga meloidorum (Purrini & Rohde 1988) Lange 1993
- Nephridiophaga ormieresi Toguebaye et al. 1986
- Nephridiophaga periplanetae (Lutz & Splendore 1903) Lange 1933
- Nephridiophaga schalleri (Pumni & Rohde 1988) Lange 1993
- Nephridiophaga tangae (Purrini, Weiser & Kohring 1988) Lange 1993
- Nephridiophaga xenoboli Ganapati & Narasimhamurti 1960
