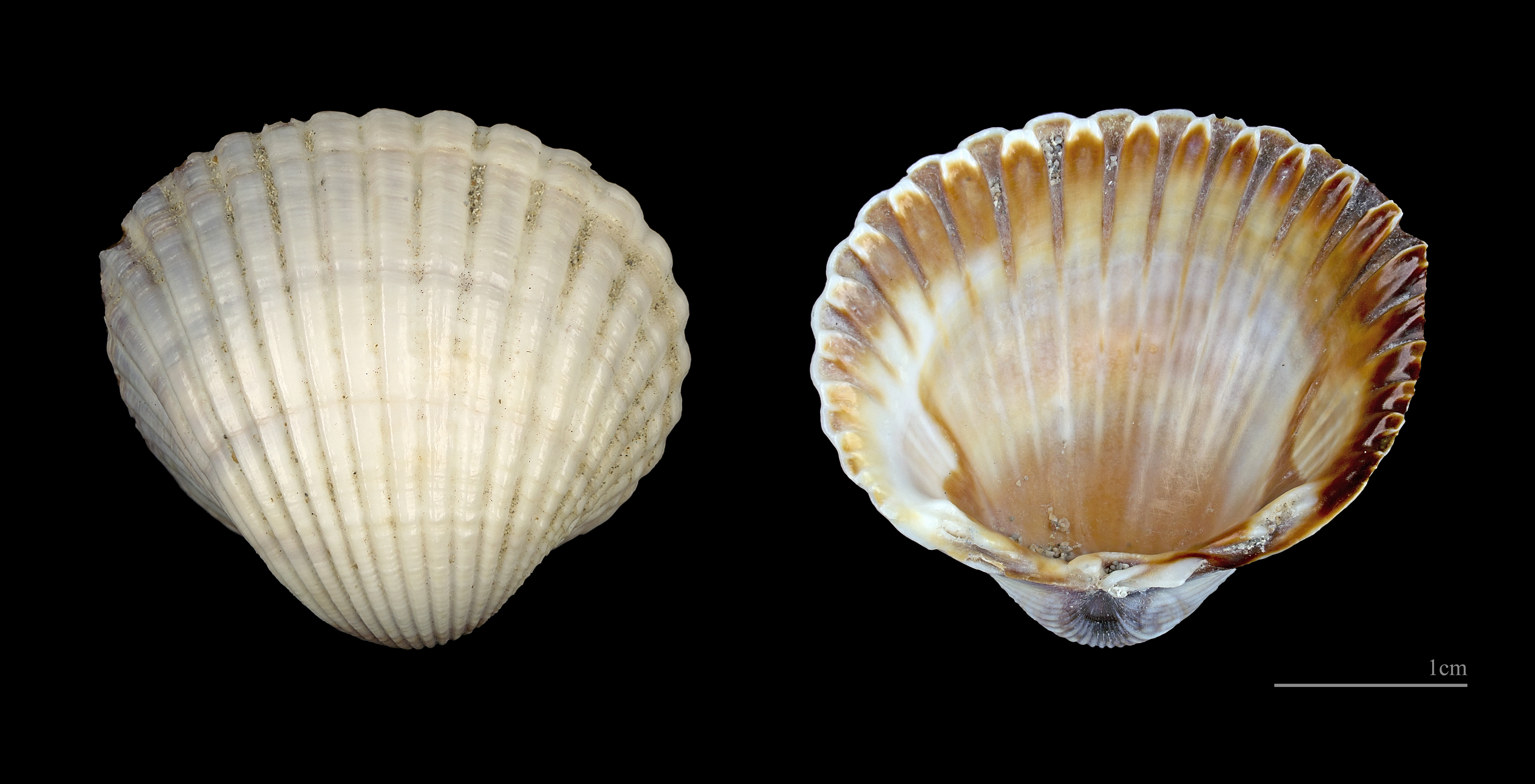

Scientific classification
- Kingdom: Animalia
- Phylum: Mollusca
- Class: Bivalvia
- Order: Cardiida
- Family: Cardiidae
- Genus: Cerastoderma
- Species: C. glaucum

Binomial name
- Cerastoderma glaucum (Bruguière, 1789)

Synonyms
- Cardium glaucum Poiret, 1789; Cerastoderma lamarcki (Reeve, 1845)

= Cerastoderma glaucum =

Species of bivalve

Cerastoderma glaucum, the lagoon cockle, is a species of saltwater clam, a marine bivalve mollusc in the family Cardiidae, the cockles.

This species is found along the coasts of Europe and North Africa, including the Mediterranean and Black Seas and the Caspian Sea, and the low-salinity Baltic Sea. It is a euryhaline species living in salinities 4-100 ‰. In north-west Europe (including the British Isles), it typically does not live on open shores but rather in shallow burrows in saline lagoons, or sometimes on lower shores in estuaries. It cannot tolerate significant exposure to the air. The form found in lagoons is thinner-shelled than the estuarine populations.

The lagoon cockle can grow to the length of 50 mm. In north-west Europe, it spawns in May–July, and the planktonic larval phase takes 11–30 days. The life span of the settled cockle is typically 2–5 years.

The species was described as Cardium glaucum in 1789 almost simultaneously both by Bruguière and by Poiret.

Cerastoderma glaucum
Right and left valve of the same specimen:

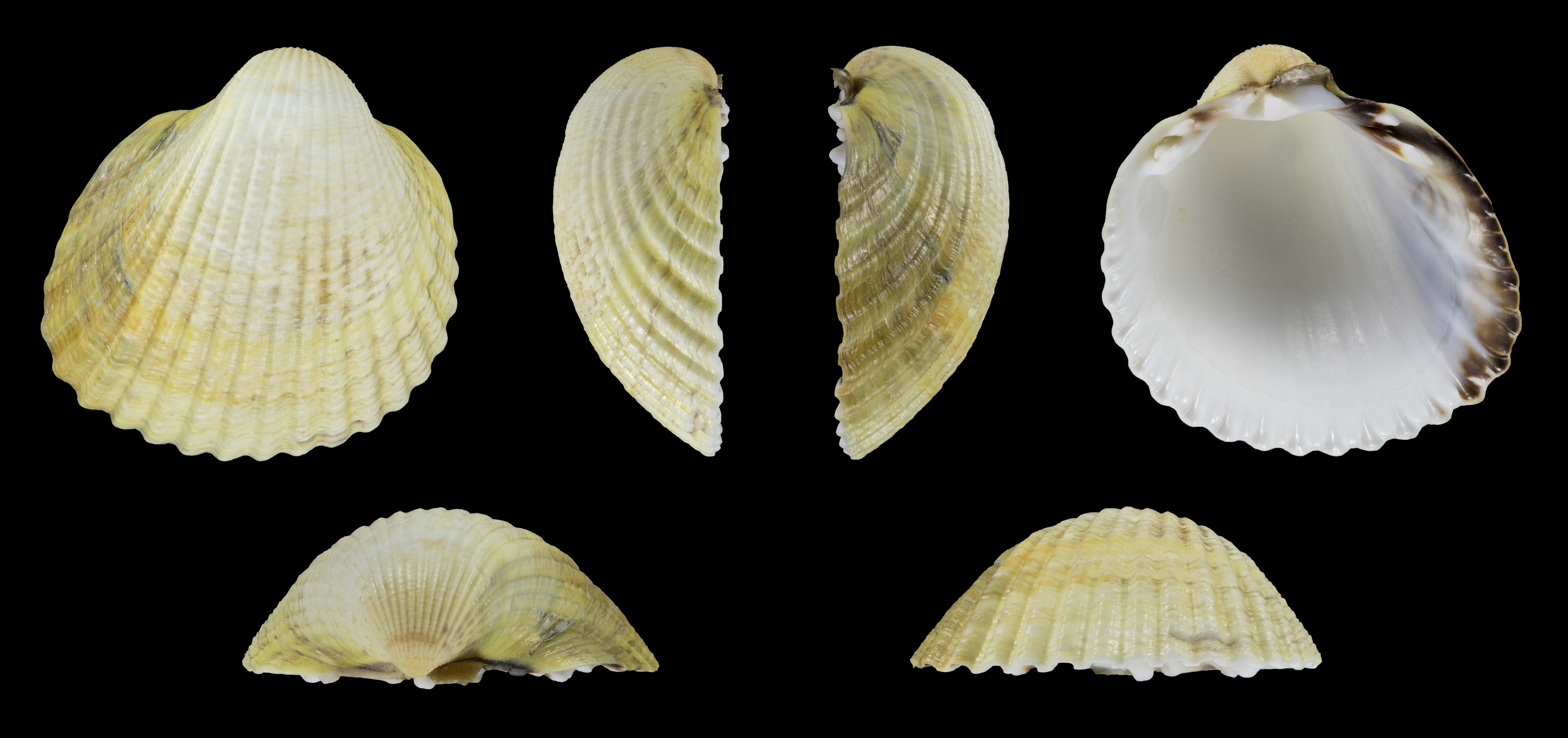
Right valve

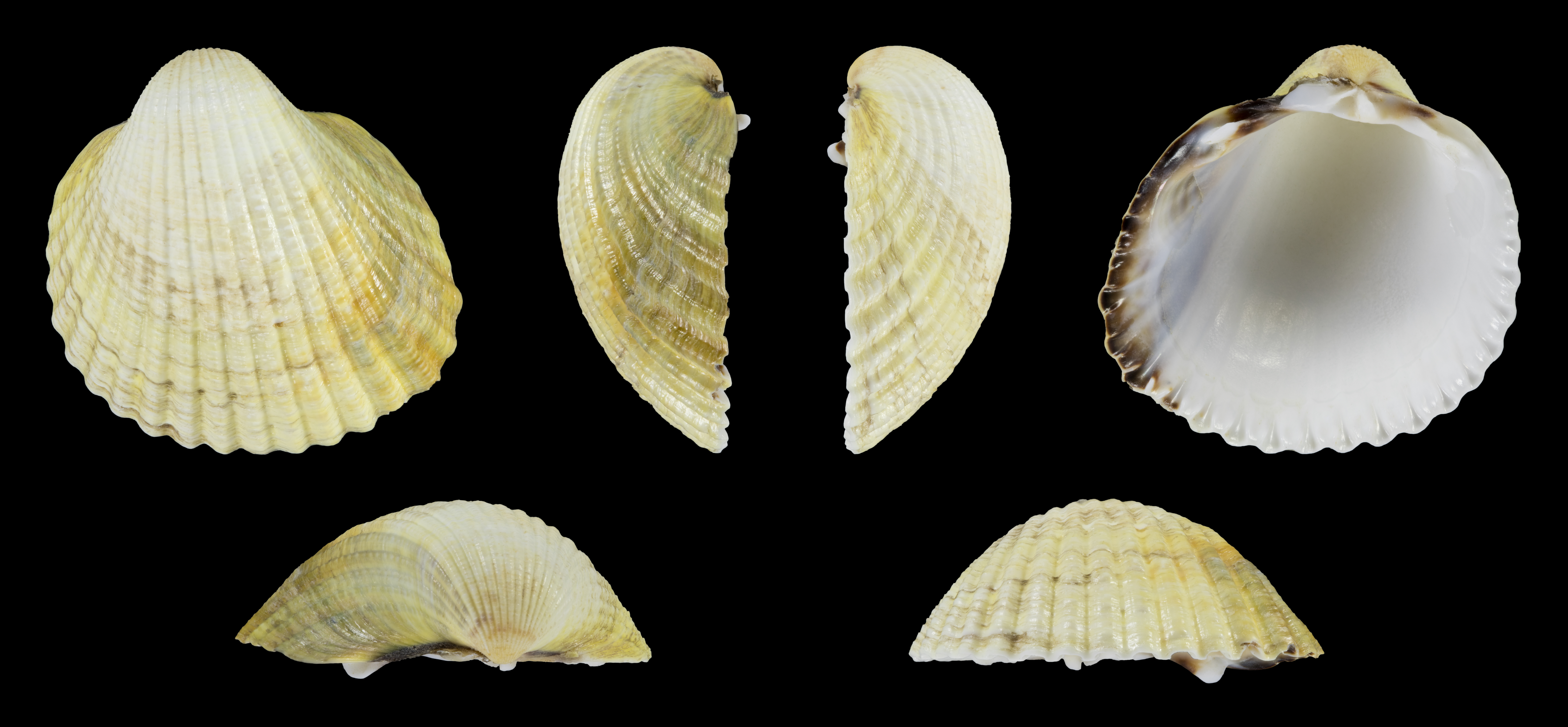
Left valve

Cerastoderma glaucum lamarcki
Right and left valve of the same specimen:

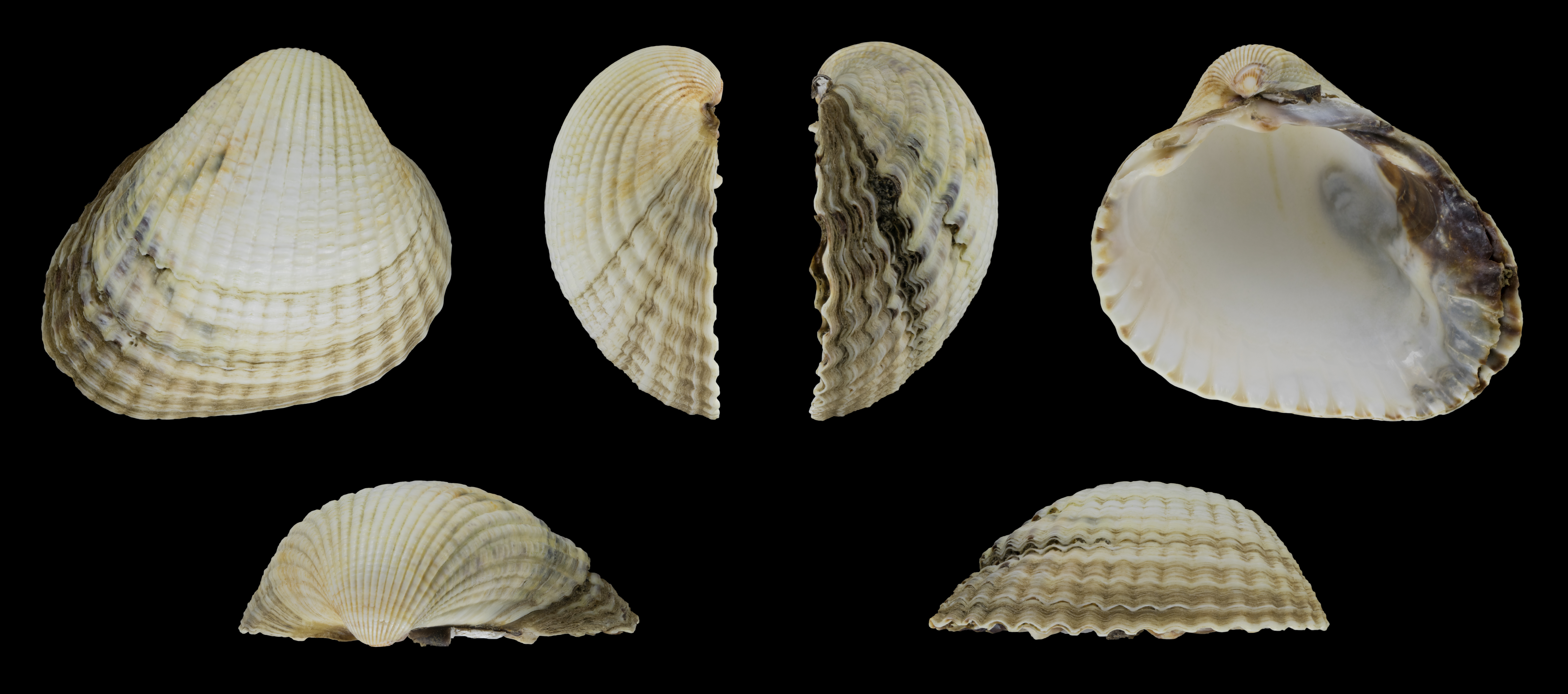
Right valve

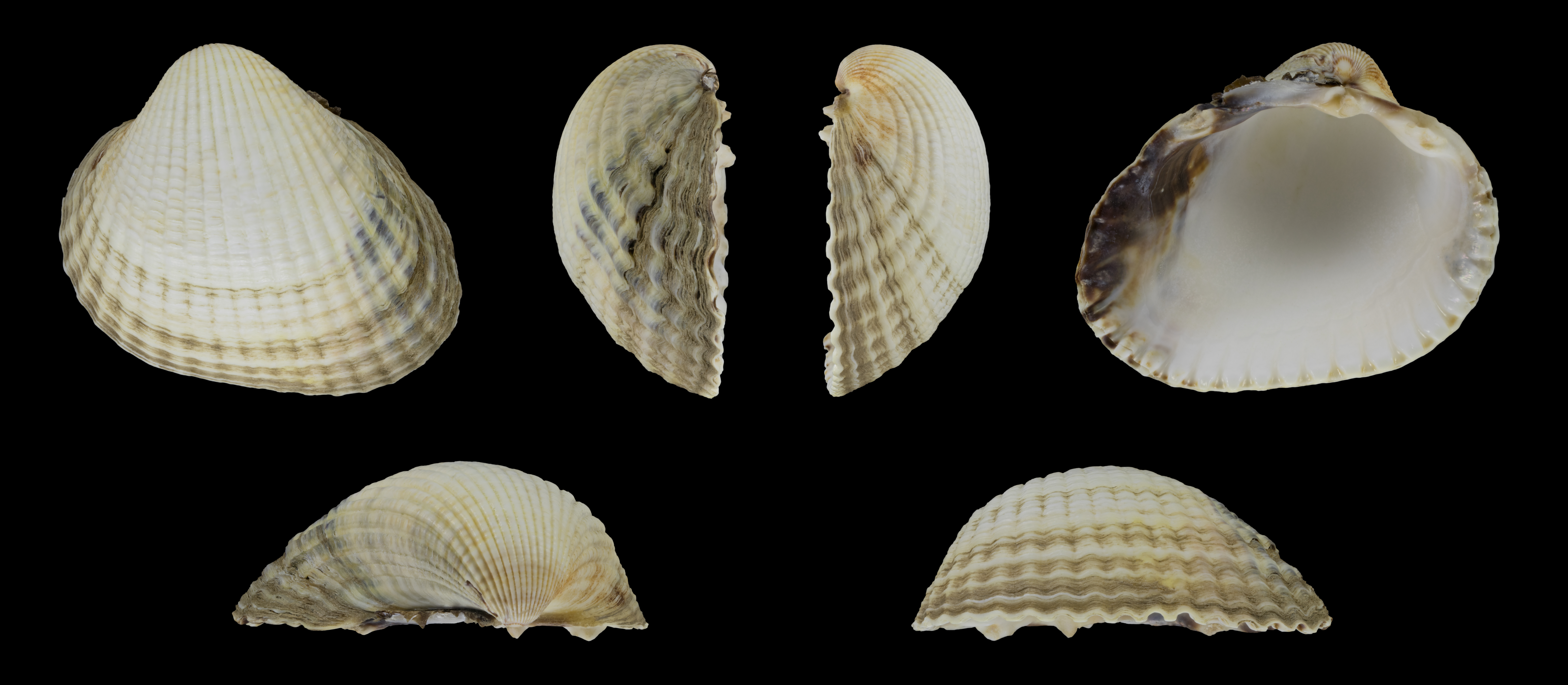
Left valve
