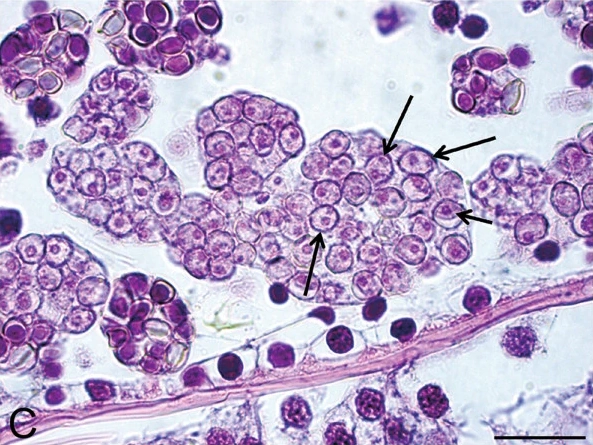
- Haplosporidium diporeiae

Scientific classification
- Domain: Eukaryota
- Clade: Sar
- Clade: Rhizaria
- Phylum: Cercozoa
- Subphylum: Endomyxa
- Superclass: Marimyxia
- Class: Ascetosporea; Desportes & Ginsburger-Vogel, 1977 emend. Cavalier-Smith 2009

Orders
- Claustrosporida; Mikrocytida; Paradiniida; Paramyxida; Haplosporida

Synonyms
- Ascetospora Sprague 1979; Stellatosporea; Aplosporidies Caullery & Mesnil, 1899

= Ascetosporea =

Group of eukaryotes that are parasites of animals

The Ascetosporea are a group of eukaryotes that are parasites of animals, especially marine invertebrates. The two groups, the haplosporids and paramyxids, are not particularly similar morphologically, but consistently group together on molecular trees, which place them near the base of the Cercozoa. Both produce spores without the complex structures found in similar groups (such as polar filaments or tubules).

Haplosporid spores have a single nucleus and an opening at one end, covered with an internal diaphragm or a distinctive hinged lid. After emerging, it develops within the cells of its host, usually a marine mollusc or annelid, although some infect other groups or freshwater species. The trophic cell is generally multinucleated. Paramyxids develop within the digestive system of marine invertebrates, and undergo internal budding to produce multicellular spores.

A 2009 study concluded that Haplosporidium species form a paraphyletic group and that the taxonomy of the haplosporidians needs a thorough revision.

== Taxonomy ==
Class Ascetosporea Desportes & Ginsburger-Vogel, 1977 emend. Cavalier-Smith 2009

- Genus ?Marteilioides Comps, Park & Desportes 1986
- Genus ?Oryctospora Purrini & Weiser 1991
- Order Claustrosporida Cavalier-Smith 2003
  - Family Claustrosporidiidae Larsson 1987
    - Genus Claustrosporidium Larsson 1987
- Order Paradiniida Cavalier-Smith in Bass et al. 2009
  - Family Paradiniidae Schiller 1935
    - Genus Paradinium Chatton, 1910
- Order Mikrocytida Hartikainen et al. 2014
  - Family Mikrocytidae Hartikainen et al. 2014
    - Genus Paramikrocytos Hartikainen et al. 2014
    - Genus Microcytos Farley, Wolf & Elston 1988
- Order Paramyxida Chatton 1911 [Paramyxea Chatton 1911; Paramyxidea Chatton 1911; Paramyxa]
  - Family Marteiliidae Grizel et al. 1974 [Occlusosporida; Marteiliida Desportes & Ginsburger-Vogel, 1977; Marteiliidea Desportes & Ginsburger-Vogel, 1977]
    - Genus Paramarteilia Ginsburger-Vogel & Desportes 1979
    - Genus Marteilia Grizel et al. 1974
  - Family Paramyxidae Chatton 1911
    - Genus Paramyxa Chatton 1911
- Order Haplosporida Caullery & Mesnil 1899 [Balanosporida Sprague, 1979; Haplosporidia Hall, 1953; Haplosporea Caullery 1953; Haplospora Margulis & Schwartz, 1998; Haplosporidiidea Poche, 1913; Haplosporidies Caullery and Mesnil, 1905]
  - Genus ?Bertramia Mesnil & Caullery 1897 non Weiser & McCauley 1974
  - Genus ?Coleospora Gibbs 1959
  - Family Nephridiophagidae Sprague 1970 [Nephridiophagea]
    - Genus Nephridiophaga Woolever 1966 [Coelosporidium Mesnil & Marchoux 1897]
  - Family Urosporidiidae Sprague 1979 [Anurosporidiidae]
    - Genus Urosporidium Caullery & Mesnil 1905 [Anurosporidium Caullery & Chappelier 1906] (8 species)
  - Family Haplosporidiidae Sprague 1979
    - Genus Bonamia Pichot et al. 1980
    - Genus Haplosporidium Caullery & Mesnil 1899 (23 species)
    - Genus Minchinia (Lankester 1895) Labbe 1896 (5 species)
