= Arachnula =

Scientific classification
- Domain: Eukaryota
- Clade: Sar
- Clade: Rhizaria
- Phylum: Endomyxa
- Class: Vampyrellidea
- Order: Vampyrellida
- Family: Vampyrellidae
- Genus: Arachnula; Cienkowsky, 1876

Genus of single-celled organisms

Arachnula is a genus of amoeboid eukaryotes first described by Leon Cienkowski in 1876.

Its phylogenetic position is a subject of some controversy. David Bass and colleagues considered it to be a vampyrellid within the Endomyxa clade of Rhizaria, and the SSU rDNA sequence isolated from an organism described as Arachnula impatiens is indeed very close to that of the vampyrellid Theratromyxa. The identification of this organism as Arachnula has, however, been questioned; and a separate amoeba identified as Arachnula by Yonas Isaak Tekle and colleagues groups in molecular phylogenies close to the amoebozoans Filamoeba and Flamella. Which of these isolates corresponds to that originally described by Cienkowski is unresolved.
