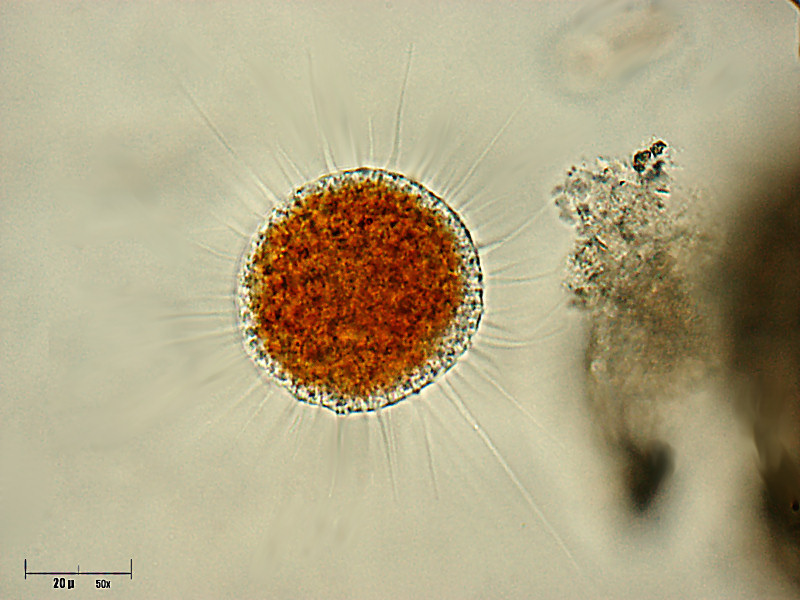
- Vampyrella lateritia

Scientific classification
- Domain: Eukaryota
- Clade: Sar
- Clade: Rhizaria
- Phylum: Endomyxa
- Class: Vampyrellidea
- Order: Vampyrellida
- Family: Vampyrellidae
- Genus: Vampyrella
- Species: V. lateritia

Binomial name
- Vampyrella lateritia Fresenius, 1856

Synonyms
- Amoeba lateritia

= Vampyrella lateritia =

Species of protist

Vampyrella lateritia is a freshwater species of predatory amoebae that feeds on species of algae and is known for its specialized feeding strategy of removing, digesting, and ingesting the cellular contents of its prey. It is the type species of the genus Vampyrella and has been identified in numerous locations around the world including Brazil, Germany, and the eastern United States. Along with Vampyrella pendula, its genome was sequenced in 2012.

== Life cycle ==
Vampyrella lateritia has four life stages that revolve about the feeding cycle: motile trophozoites (the activated, feeding stage), plasmodia in which the cytoplasm contains many nuclei, digestive cysts, and resting cysts. It has been observed feeding on species from the genera Zygnema, Spirogyra, and Mougeotia and is considered a specialist predator as its known prey is restricted to a limited number of green algal species.

Like other vampyrellids, Vampyrella lateritia grows well between 10°C and room temperature. It contains intracellular bacteria that have not yet been conclusively identified, although the morphology of the endosymbiotic bacteria resembles Ca. Megaira polyxenopila, a species of bacteria in the family Rickettsiaceae.

=== Trophozoites ===
In this stage of action and feeding, the cells are compact and spherical with radiating filopodia and pseudopodia, moving freely through the water column. The central cell body is orange and the pseudopodia are colourless. In order to move, the filopodia are positioned under the spherical body and slowly rolls the entire cell. Along the pseudopodia, numerous granules known as membranosomes shoot rapidly out of the cell cortex, connected by a thin strand of cytoplasm, and are retracted.

Trophozoites attach to an algal cell and retract their long pseudopodia, flattening the cell body tightly against the algae to increase the contact area. Feeding is proceeded by the dissolution of a hole 5-7 μm in diameter in the algae's cell wall. After several minutes of this, the cell wall bursts and the exposed protoplast is engulfed into a large food vacuole. This process is known as plasmoptysis and resembles a sucking motion. It is likely the origin of the genus name Vampyrella, Latin for 'small vampire'. The remains of the destroyed protoplast still within the algal cell are then engulfed by an ingestion pseudopodium. Vampyrella lateritia can consume several algal cells before entering the digestive cyst phase. After absorbing a single algal cell, Vampyrella lateritia is about ten times its original volume. However the dramatic increase in volume is only temporary and the amoeba returns to its normal volume within a few minutes. Vampyrella lateritia are known to only feed on live prey.

=== Plasmodia ===
Individual amoeba can fuse into large and deformed plasmodia. The structure and colour are the same as the trophozoites, however this stage occurs predominantly in old cultures of Vampyrella lateritia where cell density is high and nutrients are limited. However this stage has been observed in laboratory settings, so it is unclear the conditions under which Vampyrella lateritia would form plasmodia in natural conditions.

=== Digestive cysts ===
During digestive cyst formation, the trophozoite retracts its pseudopodia and secretes a cell wall. The digestive cysts have two cyst envelopes, where the inner is stronger than the outer. Unlike other vampyrellid amoebae, Vampyrella lateritia retains its separate food vacuoles throughout the entire digestive phase. The digestive phase is marked by a colour change of the cytoplasm as nutrients are digested - as a result, the colour of the digestive cyst is a good indicator for the cyst's maturity. Vampyrella lateritia is often seen as red or orange. After digestion is complete, trophozoites hatch and leave the parent cell through holes in the cell wall created as part of the exocytosis of food remnants.

Although the feeding process only lasts for several minutes in Vampyrella lateritia, the digestive process takes much longer, typically one to two days.

=== Resting cysts ===
As resting cysts, Vampyrella lateritia can survive freezing and desiccation for at least three years. Resting cysts have condensed contents and numerous cell walls, however the resting cyst stage of life is not an obligatory part of all Vampyrella lateritia life cycle, unlike the digestive cyst phase. The Vampyrella lateritia can return to the trophozoite phase in the presence of algae prey organisms and fresh medium.
