= Gromia appendiculariae =

Scientific classification
- Domain: Eukaryota
- Clade: Sar
- Clade: Rhizaria
- Phylum: Endomyxa
- Class: Gromiidea
- Order: Gromiida
- Family: Gromiidae
- Genus: Gromia
- Species: G. appendiculariae

Binomial name
- Gromia appendiculariae Brooks & Kellner, 1908

Single-celled organism

Gromia appendiculariae is a unicellular, and parasitic, organism in the genus Gromia, which closely resembles Gromia sphaerica.

A specimen of G. appendiculariae was discovered as a parasite attached to the tail of a species of Oikopleura.
