= Borkovia =

Scientific classification
- Domain: Eukaryota
- Clade: Sar
- Clade: Rhizaria
- Phylum: Endomyxa
- Class: Vampyrellidea
- Order: Vampyrellida
- Family: Vampyrellidae
- Genus: Borkovia; Mikryukov & Mylnikov, 1996

Genus of single-celled organisms

Borkovia is a genus of Cercozoa.
