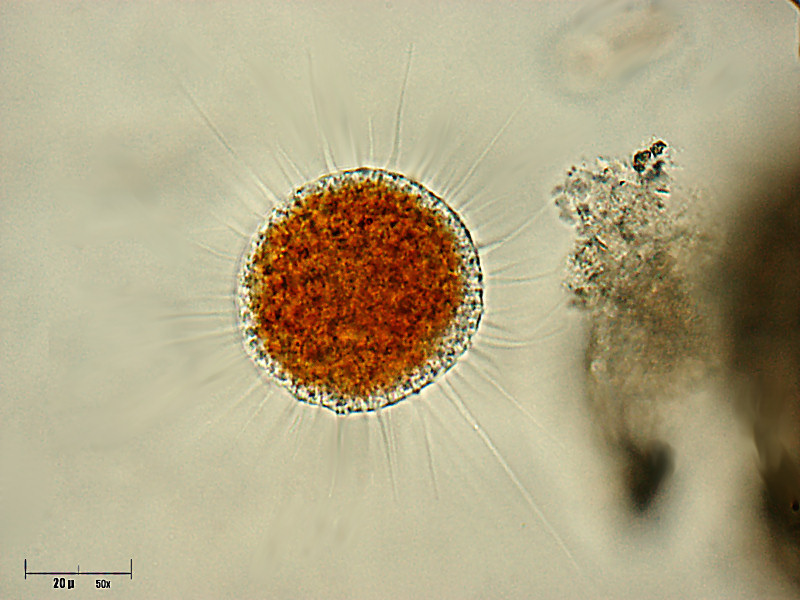
- Vampyrella lateritia

Scientific classification
- Domain: Eukaryota
- Clade: Sar
- Clade: Rhizaria
- Phylum: Cercozoa
- Subphylum: Endomyxa
- Class: Vampyrellidea
- Order: Vampyrellida
- Family: Vampyrellidae
- Genus: Vampyrella; Cienkowsky, 1865

Type species
- Vampyrella lateritia

= Vampyrella =

Genus of single-celled organisms

Vampyrella is a genus of amoebae belonging to the vampyrellid endomyxans usually ranging from 30-60 μm. Members of the genus alternate between two life stages: a free-living trophozoite stage and a cyst stage in which mitosis occurs. This taxon has received a great deal of attention due to their peculiar feeding behaviour of perforating the cell wall of algal cells and drawing out the contents for nourishment.

== History ==
Vampire amoebae were first discovered in 1865 by Leon Cienkowski. These amoebae were given the genus name Vampyrella due to their bright red colouration and their distinct feeding habits in which they perforate the cell wall of their host and draw out the inner contents of the cell, resembling that of folklore vampires.

At present, the vampyrellids are placed taxonomically in the subphylum Endomyxa along with some soil dwelling taxa. The order within Endomyxa, Vampyrellida West, 1901, consists of the genera Theratomyxa, Platyreta, ‘Arachnula’, Leptophrys and Vampyrella. Molecular sequence data exist for two families: Vampyrellidae and Leptophyridae. Frequently, Vampyrella is the only genus represented in Vampyrellidae.

== Organism and life stages ==
Most members of Vampyrella obligatorily alternate between a free living trophozoite stage and cyst stage. In the trophozoite stage amoebae are free moving. Vampyrella is characterized by a roughly spherical shape, however, it often changes shape and becomes more ellipsoid or oblong. A narrow, colourless ectoplasm at the edge of the cells can be very easily differentiated from the intensely coloured cell body. The central body tends to vary between brick red, orange, reddish yellow, brown, or green. Numerous long colourless pseudopodia extend in all directions giving trophozoites an isodiametric morphotype. These pseudopodia can be as long as three times the diameter of the cell body and may be branched or unbranched. The pseudopodia may accumulate in the direction in which the organism moves. Shorter, slow moving, pin-like pseudopodia are projected and withdrawn very quickly from the cell body in addition to having longer pseudopodia. Many vacuoles can sometimes be seen in the periphery of the organi in addition to large, bubble-like non-contractile vacuoles. Young trophozoites range from about 25-40 μm, while mature trophozoites can reach to about 70 μm. Organisms tend to have multiple spherical nuclei with a central compact nucleolus. Some species of Vampyrella have been observed to fuse with each other to form large plasmodia with the same structure and colouration as a single free-living cell. This has been observed when food has been limited.

=== Cyst stage ===
Following the trophozoite stage, cells enter an obligatory digestive and a later reproductive cyst stage. Cysts tend to appear roundish or elliptical and flattened on the side attached to a substrate. Cysts range from 50 to 100um in size. During digestion the cyst will turn from green to red, orange or brown colours. The cyst is covered in two envelopes. The outer envelope is softer and used to attach to a substrate such as filamentous food (algae). A stalk may or may not be present. The inner envelope is stronger and surrounds the cell while cell division takes place. After cell division, the daughter cells leave the cyst envelope leaving behind food remnants. During unfavourable conditions the cell may enter into a resting phase. Sex is currently unknown in the genus.

=== Mitosis ===
Orthomitosis in Vampyrella occurs late in the cyst stage. Neither microtubule organizing centers (MTOCs) nor centrioles are present during mitosis.

While in the trophozoite life stage and early cyst stage, the cell is in interphase. Heterochromatin decrease upon entering the cyst stage as the cell prepares for mitosis. The spherical nuclei increase in size from 1.5-2.0 μm in the trophozoite stage to 2.5-3.5 μm. The pars granulosa becomes more prominent within the cyst and the components begin to mix with the pars fibrosa. During prophase, chromosomes are condensed and bundles of microtubules appear on either side of the nuclei. The nucleolus begins to disintegrate within the nucleus. In metaphase, the nucleus takes on a cylindrical shape. Centric mitotic spindles do not reach the poles of the nucleus. The compacted chromosomes then create an equatorial plate with microtubules running through the plate. No kinetochores are present. Vesicles begin to accumulate near the chromosomes and the inner membrane of the intact nuclear envelope. The chromatids separate and the nuclei elongate in anaphase. This is followed by an increase in vesicles on the inner membrane. During telophase, the nuclei form a dumbbell shape. Vesicles begin to fuse around the chromosomes to form a new nuclear envelope as the older envelope disintegrates. After karyokinesis, the cell undergoes cytokinesis. At this point the nuclei are already spherical and resemble that of mature trophozoites.

== Habitat and predation ==
Vampyrellids can be found in a wide variety of habitats, soil, freshwater or marine, but members of Vampyrella tend to be found in freshwater environments.

Vampire amoebae of this genus are heterotrophic and feed on algae, notably Spirogyra but also Chaetophora or Mougeotia.

When attacking, the Vampyrella organism flattens along the filament surface of its prey. Upon attachment, the long pseudopodia disappear leaving only shorter pin-like pseudopodia. A violent shock motion is usually observed as the Vampyrella attacks the algae. Within minutes cell wall digestion initiates and the vampyrellid begins to swell as the contents of the algae are drained. The cell wall begins to bend inward due to a loss in turgor pressure causing adjacent cells of the algae to have greater pressure. Upon fully digesting through the cell wall, a hole is created in the cell wall of the algae. The vampyrellid swells rapidly and the prey cell disarticulates. The protoplast of the prey is then sucked out into a food vacuole. Remaining contents are then drawn out using pseudopodia. The vampyrellid uses its pseudopodia to move from cell to cell repeating the process. Excess water absorbed from prey cells is removed by numerous small contractile vacuoles on the periphery of the organism, maintaining an only slightly increased size after each meal. Vampyrella have been observed to both perforate the cell wall on the cell body as well as breaking the joints between algal cells to acquire the contents of the cell.

Vampyrella have also shown to be selective of food type. Once in contact with filaments, it brings its body toward the filament. If the algae are rejected it will move on. Among this selectivity, there is also differences among species within the genus. This has been observed as Vampyrella lateritia refuse to eat Oedogonium while it will be eaten by Vampyrella pendula.

== Ecology ==
Vampyrella are known to be algivorous predators which can be detrimental to the biomass of microalgal cultures. Some green microalgae are capable of rapid growth and synthesize large quantities of protein, starch and lipid. In addition, microalgae can be used in carbon capture, animal feeding, waste water bioremediation and biofuels. The main cause in loss of microalgal culture biomass is microbial contamination.

== List of species ==
- Vampyrella closterii
- Vampyrella incolor
- Vampyrella inermis
- Vampyrella lateritia
- Vampyrella multiformis
- Vampyrella pedata
- Vampyrella pendula
- Vampyrella ulothricus
- Vampyrella variabilis
- Vampyrella velata
