= Gymnophryidae =

Scientific classification
- Domain: Eukaryota
- Clade: Sar
- Clade: Rhizaria
- Phylum: Cercozoa
- Subphylum: Endomyxa
- Order: Reticulosida
- Family: Gymnophryidae; Mikrjukov & Mylnikov, 1996

Family of single-celled organisms

Gymnophryidae is a small family of amoeboids that lack shells and produce thin, reticulose pseudopods. These contain microtubules and have a granular appearance, owing to the presence of extrusomes, but are distinct from the pseudopods of Foraminifera. They are included among the Cercozoa (along with Lecythium), but differ from other cercozoans in having mitochondria with flat cristae, rather than tubular cristae.

Gymnophrys cometa, found in freshwater and soil, is representative of the group. The cell body is under 10 μm in size, and has a pair of reduced flagella, which are smooth and insert parallel to one another. It may also produce motile zoospores and cysts. Gymnophrys and Borkovia are the only confirmed genera, but other naked reticulose amoebae such as Biomyxa may be close relatives.

== Taxonomy ==
- Family Gymnophryidae Mikrjukov & Mylnikov 1996
  - Genus Gymnophrys Cienkowski 1876
    - Species Gymnophrys cometa Cienkowski 1876 non Cienkowski 1876 sensu Penard 1921
  - Genus Borkovia Mikrjukov & Mylnikov 1996
    - Species Borkovia cometa Mikrjukov & Mylnikov 1996 [Gymnophrys cometa Cienkowski 1876 sensu Penard 1921 non Cienkowski 1876; Penardia cometa (Penard 1902) de Saedeleer 1934; Borkovia desaedeleeri Mikrjukov & Mylnikov 1998]
