= Viscidocauda =

Scientific classification
- Domain: Eukaryota
- Clade: Sar
- Clade: Rhizaria
- Phylum: Cercozoa
- Subphylum: Endomyxa
- Genus: Viscidocauda; Shiratori & Ishida, 2025
- Species: V. repens

Binomial name
- Viscidocauda repens Shiratori & Ishida, 2025

Monotypic genus of protists

Viscidocauda is a genus of amoeboflagellate within the subphylum Endomyxa that was discovered in marine environments near Hachijōjima Island, Japan by Takashi Shiratori and Ken-ichiro Ishida. It contains only the novel species Viscidocauda repens.

== Etymology ==
The genus name Viscidocauda is derived from Latin roots, with viscidus meaning "sticky" or "viscous" and cauda meaning "tail", referring to the organism’s posterior flagellum used for attachment. The species epithet repens means "creeping", describing the organism’s gliding movement across surfaces.

== Morphology ==
Viscidocauda repens is a biflagellate amoeboflagellate protist characterized by its oval-shaped cell body and distinctive flagellar arrangement, marking it as the only known species in the Endomyxa subphylum to possess two persistent flagella. The anterior flagellum projects forward and is typically active during swimming, while the posterior flagellum trails behind, often remaining attached to the substrate to anchor the cell during gliding movement across surfaces. The cells exhibit slow gliding motility, supported by trailing pseudopodia that stabilize the organism while it grazes on bacterial prey. Transmission electron microscopy reveals unique internal structures, including a persistent posterior flagellum unlike those in previously described endomyxans, along with membrane-bound organelles typical of eukaryotes.

== Taxonomy and classification ==
Viscidocauda repens is classified under the domain Eukaryota, whose members are characterized by membrane-bound organelles, including the nuclear envelope surrounding the nucleus and the double membrane surrounding the mitochondrion. V. repens belongs to the kingdom Protista, as it is a unicellular organism that is distinct from animals, plants, and fungi. It is further placed within Rhizaria, a supergroup nesting between the domain and the phylum, characterized by temporary, extending pseudopodia used for locomotion. The phylum is Cercozoa, a grouping based on 18S rDNA phylogeny. The species is further classified within the subphylum Endomyxa, a group of protists that were originally believed not to have flagella. The genus has not been placed into a class, order, or family.

== Phylogeny ==
Viscidocauda repens was discovered to share a common ancestor with endomyxan groups such as Ascetosporea and Gromiidea, indicating that the species belongs to a lineage of marine parasites and amoebae. These groups were identified as part of a clade, with V. repens also showing an environmental lineage to clades identified as Endo-4 and Endo-5. The lineage has been described as a sister group to the Filosa and Skiomonadea clade. The closest known species to Viscidocauda repens has not yet been formally identified, as V. repens remains the only described species in its genus. However, using small subunit ribosomal RNA (SSU rRNA) gene sequences, researchers found similarities between V. repens and several environmental sequences obtained from marine samples, including seawater and the gut contents of herbivorous fish, with differences ranging from 0.3% to 2.6%. This indicates the presence of near relatives that have not yet been taxonomically classified. Phylogenetic analyses also indicated that a monophyly of Endomyxa was not recovered, suggesting that V. repens may represent an early-diverging lineage within the group.

== Discovery ==
Viscidocauda repens was first reported by Takashi Shiratori and Ken-ichiro Ishida of the University of Tsukuba after they examined seawater collected near Hachijojima Island, Japan, at a depth of about 5 m on September 6, 2012. The sample was filtered through a 20 µm mesh and then a 2 µm filter to concentrate smaller microorganisms before being incubated in Enriched Seawater Medium (ESM) at room temperature for about two weeks. The organism was isolated from the enrichment culture and observed using differential interference contrast light microscopy, which allowed the researchers to see its shape and gliding movement. To investigate its internal structures in more detail, they then used transmission electron microscopy, which revealed ultrastructural features of the organism.

== Behavior ==
Viscidocauda repens is a heterotrophic bacterivore that glides slowly across surfaces, anchored by its posterior flagellum while using pseudopodia to capture bacterial prey for phagocytosis. The available evidence shows that the organism is a heterotrophic protist that obtains nutrients by consuming bacteria instead of performing photosynthesis. This biflagellate motility enables both surface grazing and occasional swimming, unlike other endomyxans.

== Physiology ==
Physiologically, V. repens thrives in marine conditions under continuous darkness, confirming its lack of photosynthetic capability and reliance on bacterivory for energy. The organism's metabolism remains incompletely characterized, with no detailed studies on respiratory pathways or carbon processing; however, its ecological role suggests involvement in nutrient cycling within microbial food webs. Cells maintain eukaryotic features such as membrane-bound organelles, supporting active membrane trafficking during prey ingestion and digestion.

== Genetics data ==
Researchers extracted total genomic DNA from cultured cells and amplified the small subunit ribosomal RNA (SSU rRNA) gene using polymerase chain reaction (PCR). The gene was then cloned and sequenced, with the resulting sequence deposited in the National Center for Biotechnology Information (NCBI) database under GenBank accession number LC847298.

== Ecology ==
Viscidocauda repens dwells in coastal marine habitats and was first isolated from seawater at a depth of approximately 5 m near Hachijōjima Island, Japan (33.00° N, 140.00° E). The species inhabits particle-rich microenvironments and functions as a bacterivorous predator involved in nutrient recycling and carbon flux within microbial communities.

== Involvement in applied science ==
Viscidocauda repens, a recently described species within Rhizaria, provides evidence that protist lineages may be more complex than previously understood. Its possession of motile flagella contrasts with earlier assumptions that members of the subphylum Endomyxa lack such structures, suggesting a need to reevaluate evolutionary relationships within the group. The organism’s gliding motility and distinct anatomical features may also serve as a model for understanding transitions between motile and non-motile forms in unicellular eukaryotes. Phylogenetic analyses linking V. repens to both surface and deep marine environments further indicate potential evolutionary connections across diverse oceanic ecosystems, highlighting the complexity of microbial eukaryotic diversity.
