= Gromia dubia =

Scientific classification
- Domain: Eukaryota
- Clade: Sar
- Clade: Rhizaria
- Phylum: Endomyxa
- Class: Gromiidea
- Order: Gromiida
- Family: Gromiidae
- Genus: Gromia
- Species: G. dubia

Binomial name
- Gromia dubia Gruber, 1884

Single-celled organism

Gromia dubia is a species of testate rhizarian in the family Gromiidae. It is known from a single specimen discovered in 1884 by Gruber, and no other specimens have been found.

== See also ==
- Gromia
- Testate amoeba
