= Reticulosida =

Scientific classification
- Domain: Eukaryota
- Clade: Sar
- Clade: Rhizaria
- Phylum: Cercozoa
- Subphylum: Endomyxa
- Class: Proteomyxidea
- Order: Reticulosida; Cavalier-Smith in Cavalier-Smith & Chao 2003

Families
- Gymnophryidae; Filoretidae

Genus of single-celled organisms

Reticulosida is an order of Endomyxa that was described by Cavalier-Smith in 2003, but subsequently proposed to be changed in by Bass et al. in 2009 to include only one monotypic family, the Filoretidae. Gymnophryidae has not been assigned elsewhere.

== See also ==
- Gymnophryidae
