= Spirogyra elegans =

Scientific classification
- Kingdom: Plantae
- Class: Zygnematophyceae
- Order: Zygnematales
- Family: Zygnemataceae
- Genus: Spirogyra
- Species: S. elegans

Binomial name
- Spirogyra elegans Bonhomme

Synonyms
- Conjugata elegans (Bonhomme) Kuntze

Species of alga

Spirogyra elegans is a species of green algae in the family Zygnemataceae.
