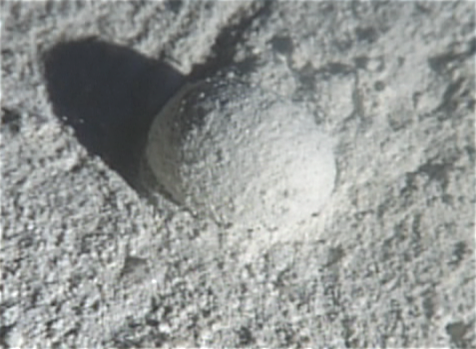
- Close-up of Gromia in place. Note the particles of sand and muck stuck to the surface.

Scientific classification
- Domain: Eukaryota
- Clade: Sar
- Clade: Rhizaria
- Phylum: Endomyxa
- Class: Gromiidea
- Order: Gromiida
- Family: Gromiidae
- Genus: Gromia
- Species: G. sphaerica

Binomial name
- Gromia sphaerica Gooday, Bowser, Bett & Smith 2000

= Gromia sphaerica =

Species of single-celled organism

Gromia sphaerica is a large spherical testate amoeba, a single-celled eukaryotic organism and the largest of its genus, Gromia. The genus itself contains about 13 known species, 3 of which were discovered as late as 2005. It was discovered in 2000, along the Oman margin of the Arabian Sea, at depths around 1,163 to 1,194 meters (3,816 to 3,917 ft). Specimens range in size from 4.7 to 38 millimeters (0.19 to 1.50 inches) in diameter. The test (organic shell) is usually spherical in shape and honeycombed with pores. There are filaments on the bottom of the organism, where it is in contact with the seafloor, and it is mostly filled with stercomata (waste pellets).

In 2008, 30-millimeter (1.2-inch) specimens were found off the coast of Little San Salvador in the Bahamas by researchers from the University of Texas. These Gromia were discovered to make mud trails as much as 50 centimeters (20 inches) in length. It was previously thought that single-celled organisms were incapable of making these kinds of trails, and their cause was previously a source of speculation. The mud trails made by the Bahamian Gromia appear to match prehistoric mud trails from the Precambrian, including 1.8 billion year-old fossil trails in the Stirling formation in Australia. Because the tracks of Gromia resemble the 1.8 billion year old traces that were believed to represent the traces of complex bilaterian worms, said tracks could have been a result of similarly giant single-celled organisms instead of complex animals.

== Description ==
Gromia sphaerica mainly resembled a grape in size and body appearance. When the sediment was removed from one of the specimens, it showed that the skin was similar to that of a grape's skin, but much softer when touched.

== Tracks ==
The tracks that G. sphaerica makes on the muddy sea floor are similar to the tracks of animals from the Ediacaran period. In some of the photos, the tracks can be seen as being curved.

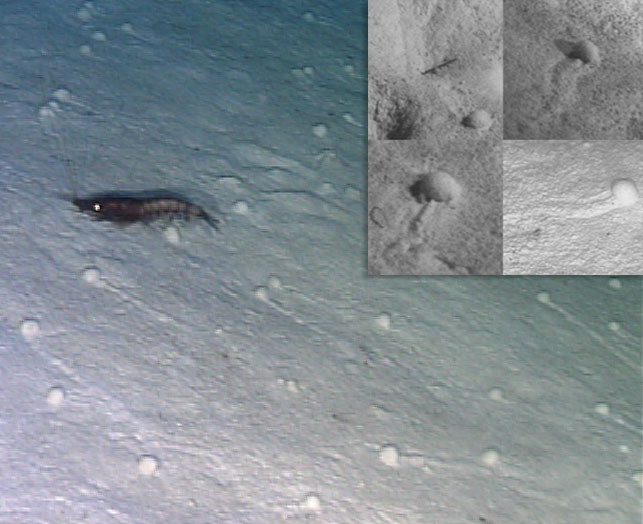
Multiple individuals of Gromia sphaerica on the slope of Exuma Valley, together with a shrimp for scale. The shrimp is about 10 cm long and maintains a horizontal position. Inset: details of individual traces.
