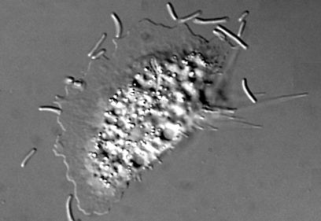
- Flamella fuviatilis

Scientific classification
- Domain: Eukaryota
- Phylum: Amoebozoa
- Class: Variosea
- Family: Flamellidae
- Genus: Flamella; Schaeffer, 1926

Type species
- Flamella magnifica Schaeffer, 1926

= Flamella =

Genus of amoebae

Flamella is a genus of fan-shaped amoebae belonging to the class Variosea within the Amoebozoa. It was described in 1926 by Asa Arthur Schaeffer.

== Description ==
Flamella is a genus of naked flattened amoebae that appear fan-shaped, semicircular or diadem-shaped during locomotion. They develop a wide forward-facing hyaloplasm, from which blunt finger-shaped pseudopodia are produced, as well as trailing filaments facing backwards. Species of Flamella may form cysts that are double-walled and present unique structures, namely ostioles and operculae (crescent-shaped), in the cross sections of walls. Its species are similar to each other, but can be distinguished by the thickness and features of the cyst wall.

== Taxonomy ==
Flamella was described in 1926 by Asa Arthur Schaeffer along with its type and, initially, only species F. magnifica. Schaeffer noted a unique irregular morphology, extremely variable during locomotion, and initially classified it in the family Hyalodiscidae (Placopodidae) together with Hyalodiscus (Placopus), a genus of vampyrellid amoebae with slender filopodia.

Molecular phylogenetic analyses eventually revealed that it belongs to the class Variosea within the Amoebozoa.

Flamella contains the following species:

- F. aegyptia Michel & Smirnov, 1999
- F. arnhemensis Kudryavtsev et al. 2009
- F. balnearia Kudryavtsev et al. 2009
- F. citrensis Bovee 1956
- F. fluviatilis Kudryavtsev et al. 2009
- F. lacustris Michel & Smirnov, 1999
- F. magnifica Schaeffer, 1926 — the type species.
- F. piscinae Brown & Walthall in Walthall et al. 2016
- F. tiara Fishbeck & Bovee 1993
