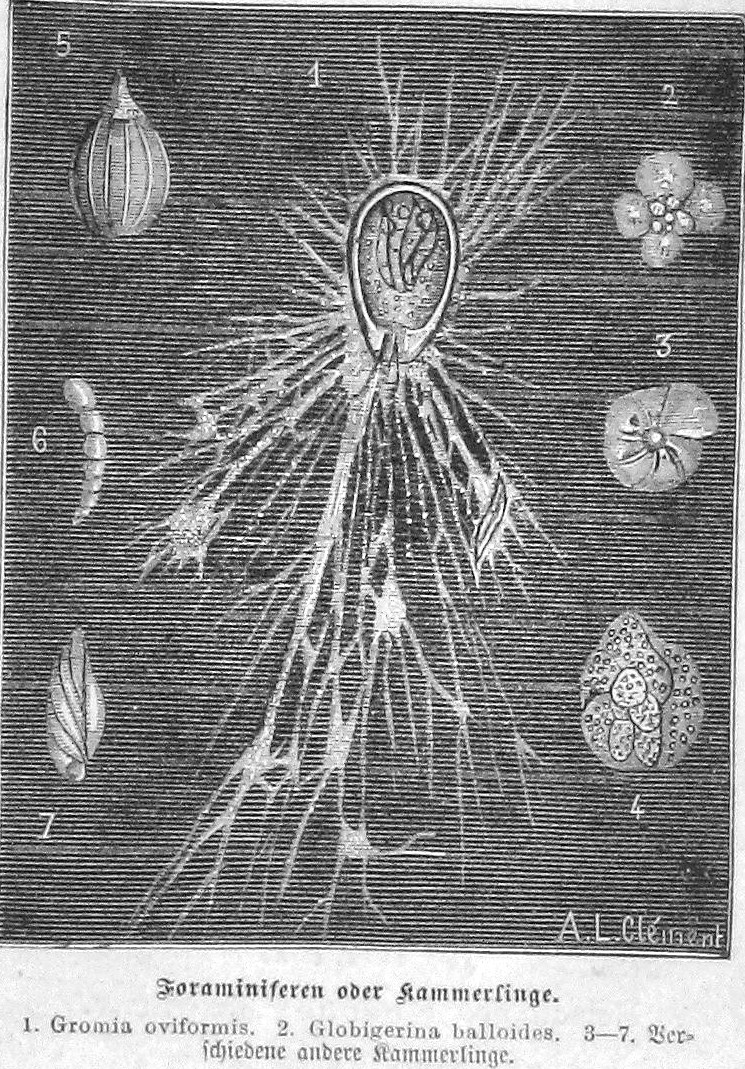
- Gromia (1) and some foraminiferans (2–7)

Scientific classification
- Domain: Eukaryota
- Supergroup: Rhizaria
- Phylum: Cercozoa
- Subphylum: Endomyxa
- Superclass: Marimyxia
- Order: Gromiida; Claparède and Lachmann, 1856
- Family: Gromiidae; Reuss, 1862
- Genus: Gromia; Dujardin, 1835

= Gromia =

Genus of protists

Gromia is a genus of protists, closely related to foraminifera, which inhabit marine and freshwater environments. It is the only genus of the family Gromiidae. Gromia are ameboid, producing filose pseudopodia that extend out from the cell's proteinaceous test through a gap enclosed by the cell's oral capsule. The test, a shell made up of protein that encloses the cytoplasm, is made up of several layers of membrane, which resemble honeycombs in shape – a defining character of this genus.

Gromia were first discovered in shallow waters, with members of the best-characterized species Gromia oviformus often found inhabiting rock surfaces, sediments, or seaweed holdfasts. However, research from the 1990s and early 2000s identified gromiids inhabiting depths up to 4,392 m, leading to several new deep-sea Gromia species being described and recognized.

A recent study of the deep-sea species Gromia sphaerica revealed that it produces traces on the seafloor which resemble fossil traces formerly attributed to early Bilateria (animals with bilateral symmetry); this now calls into question whether such fossil traces are reliable as documentation of early multicellular animal diversification in the Precambrian era.

Deep-sea gromiids have also been shown to be important for carbon cycling and denitrification.

== History of study ==
Gromia were first described in the 1835, with G. oviformis gaining prominence because it was often found in the intertidal zones on the British coast. Initially, Gromia were regarded as members of Foraminifera or Filosea, as noted in a review by Cifelli (1990).

Gromia became better characterized throughout the 1960s, when electron microscopy revealed more details on their morphology, including their honeycomb membranes.

The first molecular studies involving Gromia, which sampled G. oviformis, used small subunit (SSU) ribosomal RNA genes and concluded that Gromia were members of Cercozoa, a large group of amoebae with tests and filose pseudopodia. Follow-up studies on this group placed Gromia within the Gromiidea class, again based on SSU rRNA genes Eventually, when molecular studies combined data from several genes – actin, polyubiquitin, RNA polymerase II and small subunit rRNA genes – Gromia was shown to be a sister group to Foraminifera. Moreover, within the genus Gromia, studies of the small subunit ribosomal RNA genes of various deep-sea gromiids has revealed species diversity within Gromia, with molecular data tending to correlate with distinct morphologies of the various species’ tests.

Gromia were long thought to only inhabit shallow waters, until samples from the Arabian Sea from depths below 1,000 m revealed the first deep-sea gromiid – Gromia sphaerica. Additional species of deep-sea Gromia protists were later described in waters from the Arabian sea, the European Arctic sea, and off the coast of Antarctica, among other locations, and characterized both morphologically and through molecular studies of their small subunit rRNA genes.

== Habitat and ecology ==
Gromiids inhabit sediments or surfaces of flora in both shallow waters and the deep sea. The best characterized species of shallow-water Gromia is G. oviformis. It inhabits intertidal zones and other regions of shallow waters; it is often found attached to rocks, kelp, weeds, Cladophora algae, or within sediments. G. oviformis has been shown to tolerate a temperature range of 0–30 °C.

Deep-sea gromiids have been found in the Arabian sea, off the coast of Antarctica and in the water of the Northwest Atlantic Ocean. They were often collected from the 1,000–3,100 m range. Oxygen levels in gromiid habitats tend to exceed 0.2 mL/L and are therefore not limiting to the organisms’ growth. The temperature tolerance of deep-sea Gromia is uncertain.

Gromia are thought to acquire nutrients from the organic matter in sediments on the sea floor, as they are often found in areas with abundant phytodetritus. Their apertures face down on sediment surfaces and they use their pseudopodia to feed.

Gromiids found in the deep sea near Oman and Pakistan are often found with Foraminifera, filamentous prokaryotes and bacteria living on their cell surface. Gromiids provide substrates and serve as a surface for attachment to their epibionts.

== Description ==
Gromia members are quite large, ranging from 0.4 mm to 30 mm. Their proteinaceous tests vary in shapes, from spherical (e.g. G. oviformis), “sausage shaped”, “grape-shaped”, or pear-shaped (e.g. G. pyriformis). Test shape is often used for classifying Gromia species, and their morphology tends to align with the molecular data used to differentiate species. The interior of the test is layered with membranes with a honeycomb pattern. These honeycomb membranes are a unique feature of Gromia.

An oral complex containing an aperture (an opening in the test) allows the filose pseudopodia to extend out. The pseudopodia are non-granular, and can form connections to make net-like structures. Gromia use their pseudopodia to crawl along the surface of sediments. Waste pellets (“stercomata”) and mineral grains accumulate inside the cell – another characteristic feature of Gromia.

== Life cycle ==
Gromia have been observed to undergo both asexual and sexual reproduction. In sexual reproduction observed in G. oviformis, the shells of adult organisms fuse. Gametogenesis and fertilization follow, after which the zygotes mature into amoebulae and exit the parental shells.

== Practical importance ==
Gromiids are hypothesized to be important for carbon cycling, as they are often found in carbon-rich sediments and feed on detritus. In addition, gromiids have been shown to store high levels of intracellular nitrate, suggesting a role for gromiids in denitrification.

Gromiids have also enriched our understanding of evolutionary history. The ability of the giant, deep-sea species G. sphaerica to produce tracks on the sea floor has been used to propose a re-evaluation of the use of fossils with similar traces as evidence for dating the origins of animals with bilateral symmetry.

== List of species ==
Sources:

- Gromia oviformis Dujardin, 1835
- Gromia appendiculariae Brooks & Kellner, 1908
- Gromia dubia Gruber, 1884
- Gromia dujardinii Schultze, 1854
- Gromia fluvialis Dujardin, 1837
- Gromia granulata Schulze, 1875
- Gromia solenopus Zarnik, 1907
- Gromia granulata Schulze, 1875
- Gromia hyalina Schlumberger, 1845
- Gromia paludosa Cienkowski, 1876
- Gromia pyriformis Gooday & Bowser, 2005
- Gromia schulzei Norman, 1892
- Gromia sphaerica Gooday, Bowser, Bett & Smith 2000
