= Plasmodium (life cycle) =

Living structure of cytoplasm that contains many nuclei

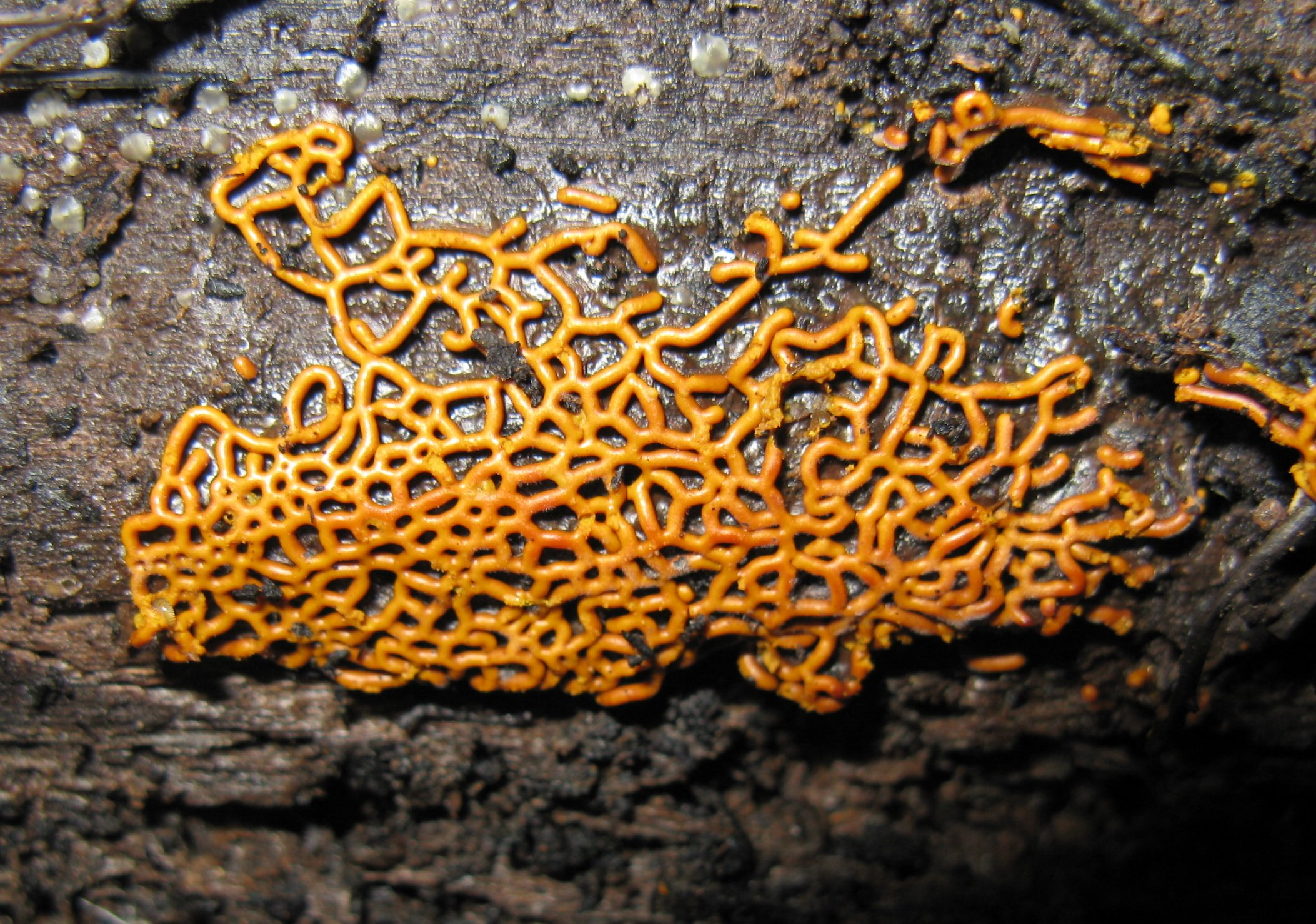
Plasmodiocarp of the slime mold Hemitrichia serpula: the living structure contains many nuclei, not separated from each other by cell membranes or cell walls.

A plasmodium is a unicellular organism, a living structure of cytoplasm that contains many nuclei, rather than being divided into individual cells each with a single nucleus.

Plasmodia are best known from slime molds, but are also found in parasitic Myxosporea, and some algae such as the Chlorarachniophyta.

== Structure ==
A plasmodium is an amoeboid, multinucleate, and naked mass of cytoplasm that contains many diploid nuclei. The resulting structure, a coenocyte, is created by many nuclear divisions without the process of cytokinesis, which in other organisms pulls newly-divided cells apart. In some cases, the resulting structure is a syncytium, created by the fusion of cells after division. Under suitable conditions, a plasmodium may differentiate and form fruiting bodies bearing spores at their tips.

== Taxonomic distribution ==
The term plasmodium, introduced by Leon Cienkowski, usually refers to the feeding stage of slime molds; these are macroscopic mycetozoans.

The multinucleate developmental stages of some intracellular parasites, namely Microsporidia (now in Fungi), Orthonectida, and Myxosporidia (now in Cnidaria), former cnidosporans, are also sometimes called plasmodia.

Similarly, in Rhizaria, the amoeboid, multinucleate protoplasts of some Cercozoan algae, e.g. Chlorarachniophyta, are called plasmodia. These lack cell walls; the syncytia are created by cell fusion. Some plasmodiophorids and haplosporidians are other multinucleated rhizarians.
