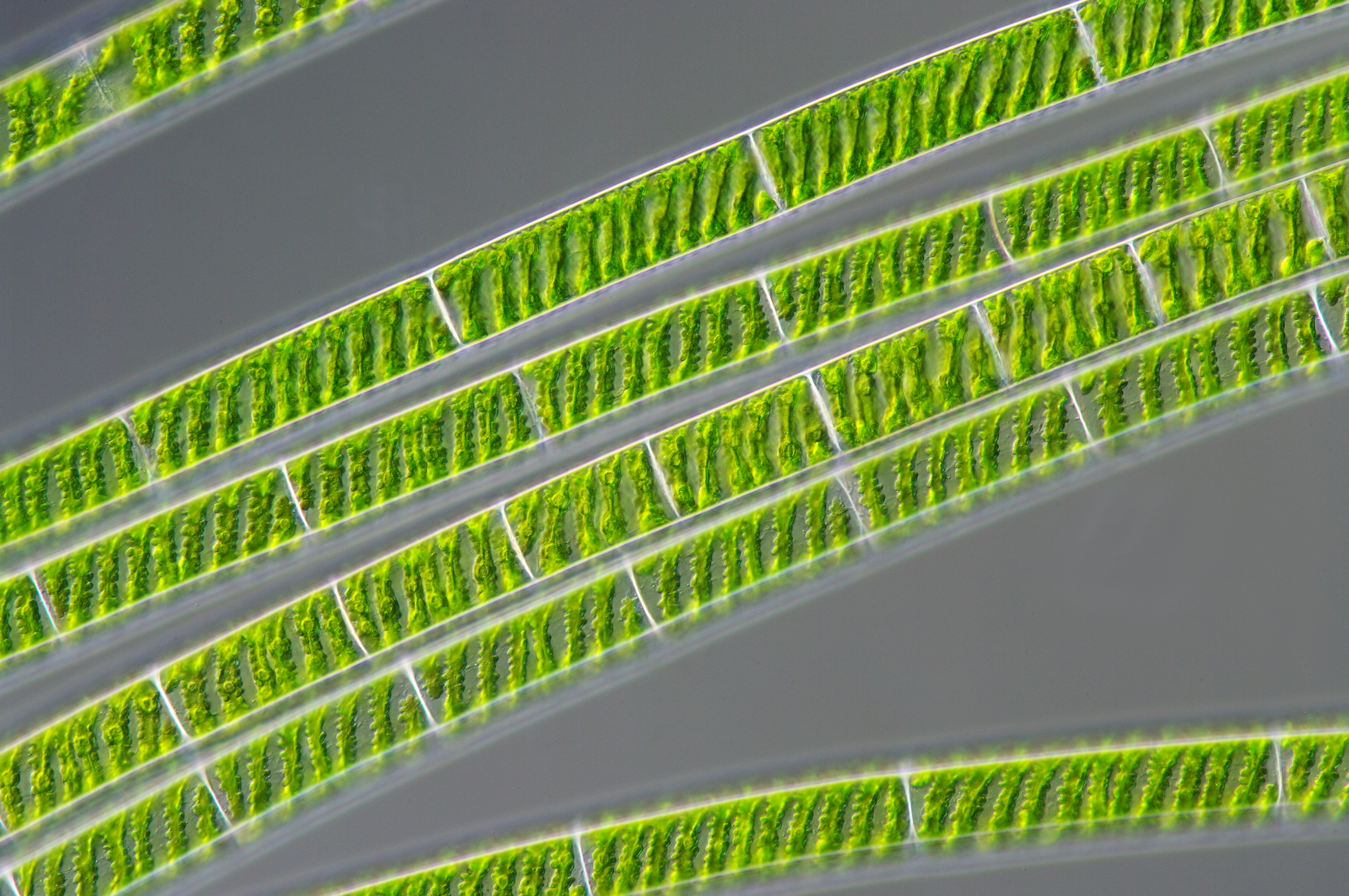
- Spirogyra with its characteristic helically arranged chloroplasts

Scientific classification
- Domain: Eukaryota
- Supergroup: Archaeplastida
- Clade: Viridiplantae
- Class: Zygnematophyceae
- Order: Spirogyrales
- Family: Spirogyraceae
- Genus: Spirogyra; Link in C. G. Nees, 1820

Type species
- Spirogyra porticalis (O. F. Müller) Dumortier

Species
- Over 400; see text

Synonyms
- Conjugata Vaucher, 1803; Jugalis Schrank, 1814

= Spirogyra =

Genus of charophyte green algae

Spirogyra (common names include water silk, mermaid's tresses, and blanket weed) is a genus of filamentous charophyte green algae of the family Spirogyraceae, named for the helical or spiral arrangement of the chloroplasts that is characteristic of the genus. Spirogyra species, of which there are more than 500, are commonly found in freshwater habitats. Spirogyra measures approximately 10 to 150 micrometres in width (though not usually more than 60) and may grow to several centimetres in length.

== Distribution ==
Spirogyra can be found on every continent on Earth, including Antarctica. It is freshwater algae, found in rivers, ponds, and other such bodies of water.

== Taxonomy ==
The genus Spirogyra was named by German naturalist Johann Heinrich Friedrich Link in 1820. The lectotype, Spirogyra porticalis was designated in 1952 by Paul C. Silvia.

== Reproduction ==
Spirogyra can reproduce both sexually and asexually. In vegetative reproduction, fragmentation takes place, and Spirogyra simply undergoes intercalary cell division to extend the length of the new filaments.

Sexual reproduction is of two types:

1. Scalariform conjugation requires association of two or more different filaments lined side by side, either partially or throughout their length. One cell each from opposite lined filaments emits tubular protuberances known as conjugation tubes, which elongate and fuse to make a passage called the conjugation canal. The cytoplasm of the cell acting as the male travels through this tube and fuses with the female cytoplasm, and the gametes fuse to form a zygospore.
2. In lateral conjugation, gametes are formed in a single filament. Two adjoining cells near the common transverse wall give out protuberances known as conjugation tubes, which further form the conjugation canal upon contact. The male cytoplasm migrates through the conjugation canal, fusing with the female. The rest of the process proceeds as in scalariform conjugation.

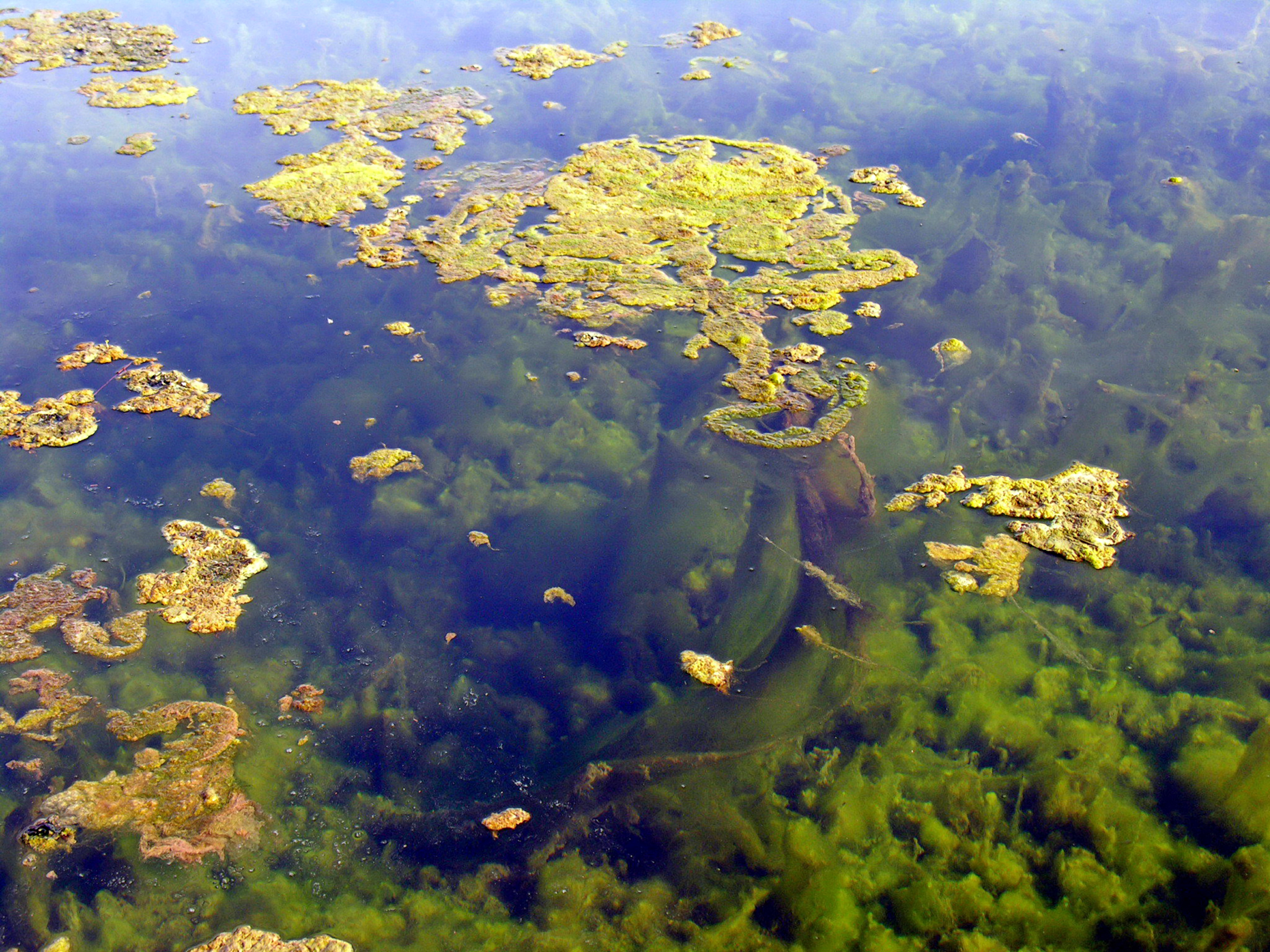
Macroscopic view of Spyrogira.

The essential difference is that scalariform conjugation occurs between two filaments and lateral conjugation occurs between two adjacent cells on the same filament.

== Usage ==
Spirogyra species are being researched for their potential in bioremediation. Specifically, in stemming toxic runoff from mines (where they are often found occurring naturally) and from municipal wastewater. Spirogyra has also been investigated as a potential biofuel.

Spirogyra species, such as S. varians, are also being researched for potential pharmaceutical usage due to their high nutrient densities.

== Species ==
The following species are currently accepted. For a more comprehensive and up-to-date list of currently accepted species, view the pages on AlgaeBase or WoRMS.

- Spirogyra abbreviata Zheng
- Spirogyra acanthophora (Skuja) Czurda
- Spirogyra acumbentis Vodenicarov
- Spirogyra adjerensis Gauthier-Lièvre
- Spirogyra adnata (Vaucher) Kützing
- Spirogyra adornata Ling
- Spirogyra aequinoctialis G.S.West
- Spirogyra affinis (Hassall) Petit
- Spirogyra africana (F.E.Fritsch) Czurda
- Spirogyra ahmedabadensis Kamat
- Spirogyra alpina Kützing
- Spirogyra alternata Kützing
- Spirogyra amplectens Skuja
- Spirogyra ampliata L.Liu
- Spirogyra anchora Skuja
- Spirogyra angolensis Welwitsch
- Spirogyra angulata Nipkow
- Spirogyra anomala Bhashyakarla Rao
- Spirogyra anzygoapora Singh
- Spirogyra aphanosculpta Skuja
- Spirogyra aplanospora Randhawa
- Spirogyra arcta (C.Agardh) Endlichter
- Spirogyra arcuata Liu
- Spirogyra areolata Lagerheim
- Spirogyra arizonensis Rickert & Hoshaw
- Spirogyra arthuri Woodhead & Tweed
- Spirogyra articulata Transeau
- Spirogyra asiatica Czurda
- Spirogyra atasiana Czurda
- Spirogyra atrobrunnea Gauthier-Lièvre
- Spirogyra aubvillei Gauthier-Lièvre
- Spirogyra australica Czurda
- Spirogyra australiensis K.Möbius
- Spirogyra austriaca Czurda
- Spirogyra azygospora Singh
- Spirogyra baileyi Schmidle
- Spirogyra batekiana Gauthier-Lièvre
- Spirogyra bellis (Hassall) P.Crouan & H.Crouan
- Spirogyra bicalyptrata Czurda
- Spirogyra bichromatophora (Randhawa) Transeau
- Spirogyra biformis C.-C.Jao
- Spirogyra biharensis A.M.Verma & B.Kumari
- Spirogyra bii Kadlubowska
- Spirogyra bireticulata Liu
- Spirogyra borealis Zheng & Ling
- Spirogyra borgeana Transeau
- Spirogyra borgei Kadlubowska
- Spirogyra borkuense Gauthier-Lièvre
- Spirogyra borysthenica Kasanowsky & Smirnoff [Smirnov]
- Spirogyra bourrellyana Gauthier-Lièvre
- Spirogyra braziliensis (Nordstedt) Transeau
- Spirogyra britannica Godward
- Spirogyra brunnea Czurda
- Spirogyra buchetii Petit
- Spirogyra bullata C.-C.Jao
- Spirogyra calcarea Transeau
- Spirogyra calchaquiesiae B.Tracanna
- Spirogyra californica Stancheva, J.D.Hall, McCourt & Sheath
- Spirogyra calospora Cleve
- Spirogyra canaliculata Segar
- Spirogyra cardinia S.H.Lewis
- Spirogyra caroliniana G.E.Dillard
- Spirogyra castanacea G.C.Couch
- Spirogyra cataeniformis (Hassall) Kützing
- Spirogyra catenaeformis (Hassall) Kützing
- Spirogyra cavata Vodenicarov
- Spirogyra chakiaensis (Bhashyakarla Rao) Kreiger
- Spirogyra chandigarhensis
- Spirogyra chekiangensis C.-C.Jao
- Spirogyra chenii C.-C.Jao
- Spirogyra chungkingensis C.-C.Jao
- Spirogyra chuniae C.-C.Jao
- Spirogyra circumlineata Transeau
- Spirogyra clavata Segar
- Spirogyra cleveana Transeau
- Spirogyra colligata Hodgetts
- Spirogyra columbiana Czurda
- Spirogyra communis (Hassall) Kützing
- Spirogyra condensata (Vaucher) Dumortier
- Spirogyra congolensis Gauthier-Lièvre
- Spirogyra conspicua Gay
- Spirogyra convoluta
- Spirogyra corrugata Woodhead & Tweed
- Spirogyra costata Kadlubowska
- Spirogyra costulata Kadlubowska
- Spirogyra coumbiana Czurda
- Spirogyra crassa (Kützing) Kützing
- Spirogyra crassispina C.-C.Jao
- Spirogyra crassiuscula (Wittrock & Nordstedt) Transeau
- Spirogyra crassivallicularis C.-C.Jao
- Spirogyra crassoidea (Transeau) Transeau
- Spirogyra crenulata Singh
- Spirogyra croasdaleae Blum
- Spirogyra cyanosporum
- Spirogyra cylindrica Czurda
- Spirogyra cylindrosperma (West & G.S.West) Krieger
- Spirogyra cylindrospora West & G.S.West
- Spirogyra czubinskii Kadlubowska
- Spirogyra czurdae Misra
- Spirogyra czurdiana Kadlubowska
- Spirogyra dacimina (O.F.Müller) Kützing
- Spirogyra daedalea Lagerheim
- Spirogyra daedaleoides Czurda
- Spirogyra danica Kadlubowska
- Spirogyra decimina (O.F.Müller) Dumortier
- Spirogyra densa Kützing
- Spirogyra denticulata Transeau
- Spirogyra dentireticulata C.-C.Jao
- Spirogyra desikacharyensis Rattan
- Spirogyra dialyderma Ling & Zheng
- Spirogyra dicephala C.-C.Jao & H.Z.Zhu
- Spirogyra dictyospora C.-C.Jao
- Spirogyra diluta H.C.Wood
- Spirogyra dimorpha Geitler
- Spirogyra discoidea Transeau
- Spirogyra distenta Transeau
- Spirogyra diversizygotica (V.I.Polyanskij) L.A.Rundina
- Spirogyra djalonensis Gauthier-Lièvre
- Spirogyra djiliense Gauthier-Lièvre
- Spirogyra dodgeana
- Spirogyra drilonensis Petkoff
- Spirogyra dubia Kützing
- Spirogyra echinata Tiffany
- Spirogyra echinospora Blum
- Spirogyra eillipsospora Transeau
- Spirogyra elegans Wollny
- Spirogyra elegantissima Y.J.Ling & Y.M.Zheng
- Spirogyra ellipsospora Transeau
- Spirogyra elliptica C.-C.Jao
- Spirogyra elongata (H.C.Wood) H.C.Wood
- Spirogyra elongata (Vaucher) Dumortier
- Spirogyra emilianensis Bonhomme
- Spirogyra endogranulata O.Bock & W.Bock
- Spirogyra exilis West & G.S.West
- Spirogyra fallax (Hansgirg) Wille
- Spirogyra fassula Zheng
- Spirogyra favosa Y.-X.Wei & Y.-K.Yung
- Spirogyra fennica Cedercreutz
- Spirogyra ferruginea H.W.Liang
- Spirogyra flavescens (Hassall) Kützing
- Spirogyra flavicans Kützing
- Spirogyra fluviatilis Hilse
- Spirogyra formosa (Transeau) Czurda
- Spirogyra fossa C.-C.Jao
- Spirogyra fossulata C.-C.Jao & Hu
- Spirogyra foveolata (Transeau) Czurda
- Spirogyra franconica O.Bock & W.Bock
- Spirogyra frankliniana Tiffany
- Spirogyra frigida F.Gay
- Spirogyra fritschiana Czurda
- Spirogyra fukienica Wei
- Spirogyra fuzhouensis H.-J.Hu
- Spirogyra gallica Petit
- Spirogyra gaterslebensis Reith
- Spirogyra gauthier-lievrae Kadlubowska
- Spirogyra gauthieri Gayral
- Spirogyra gharbensis Gauthier-Lièvre
- Spirogyra ghosei Singh
- Spirogyra gibberosa C.-C.Jao
- Spirogyra glabra Czurda
- Spirogyra globulispora Gauthier-Lièvre
- Spirogyra gobonensis Gauthier-Lièvre
- Spirogyra goetzei Schmidle
- Spirogyra gracilis Kützing
- Spirogyra granulata C.-C.Jao
- Spirogyra gratiana Transeau
- Spirogyra groenlandica Rosenvinge
- Spirogyra guangchowensis Zhu & Zhong
- Spirogyra guineense Gauthier-Lièvre
- Spirogyra gujaratensis Kamat
- Spirogyra gurdaspurensis Rattan
- Spirogyra haimenensis C.-C.Jao
- Spirogyra hartigii (Kützing) De Toni
- Spirogyra hassalii (Jenner) Petit
- Spirogyra hassallii (Jenner ex Hassall) P.Crouan & H.Crouan
- Spirogyra hatillensis Transeau
- Spirogyra heeriana Nägeli ex Kützing
- Spirogyra henanensis (L.J.Bi) L.J.Bi
- Spirogyra herbipolensis O.Bock & W.Bock
- Spirogyra heterospora Liu
- Spirogyra hoehnei O.Borge
- Spirogyra hoggarica (Gauthier-Lièvre) Gauthier-Lièvre
- Spirogyra hollandiae Taft
- Spirogyra hopeiensis C.-C.Jao
- Spirogyra hunanensis C.-C.Jao
- Spirogyra hungarica Langer
- Spirogyra hyalina Cleve
- Spirogyra hymerae Britton & B.H.Smith
- Spirogyra inconstans Collins
- Spirogyra incrassata Czurda
- Spirogyra indica Krieger
- Spirogyra inflata (Vaucher) Dumortier
- Spirogyra insignis (Hassall) Kützing
- Spirogyra insueta Zhu & Zhong
- Spirogyra intermedia Rabenhorst
- Spirogyra intorta C.-C.Jao
- Spirogyra ionia Wade
- Spirogyra irregularis Nägeli ex Kützing
- Spirogyra ivorensis Gauthier-Lièvre
- Spirogyra iyengarii Kadlubowska
- Spirogyra jaoensis Randhawa
- Spirogyra jaoi S.H.Ley
- Spirogyra jassiensis (Teodoresco) Czurda
- Spirogyra jatobae Transeau
- Spirogyra jogensis Iyengar
- Spirogyra jugalis (Dillwyn) Kützing
- Spirogyra juliana Stancheva, J.D.Hall, McCourt & Sheath
- Spirogyra kaffirita Transeau
- Spirogyra kamatii Kamat
- Spirogyra karnalae Randhawa
- Spirogyra kolae Hajdu
- Spirogyra koreana J.-H.Kim, Y.H.Kim, & I.K.Lee
- Spirogyra krubergii V.J.Poljanski
- Spirogyra kundaensis Singh
- Spirogyra kuusamoensis Hirn
- Spirogyra labbei Gauthier-Lièvre
- Spirogyra labyrinthica Transeau
- Spirogyra lacustris Czurda
- Spirogyra lagerheimii Wittrock
- Spirogyra laka Kützing
- Spirogyra lallandiae Taft
- Spirogyra lambertiana Transeau
- Spirogyra lamellata (Bhashyakarla Rao) Krieger
- Spirogyra lamellosa C.-C.Jao
- Spirogyra lapponica Lagerheim
- Spirogyra latireticulata Zheng & Ling
- Spirogyra latviensis Czurda
- Spirogyra laxa Kützing
- Spirogyra laxistrata C.-C.Jao
- Spirogyra lenticularis Transeau
- Spirogyra lentiformis L.J.Bi
- Spirogyra lians Transeau
- Spirogyra libyca Gauthier-Lièvre
- Spirogyra lismorensis Playfair
- Spirogyra lodziensis Kadlubowska
- Spirogyra longifissa Wei
- Spirogyra lubrica Kützing
- Spirogyra lucknowensis (Prasad & Dutta) Kadlubowska
- Spirogyra lushanensis L.C.Li
- Spirogyra luteospora Czurda
- Spirogyra lutetiana Petit
- Spirogyra lymerae Britton & Smith
- Spirogyra macrospora (C.B.Rao) Krieger
- Spirogyra maghrebiana Gauthier-Lièvre
- Spirogyra major Kützing
- Spirogyra majuscula Kützing
- Spirogyra malmeana Hirn
- Spirogyra manormae Randhawa
- Spirogyra maravillosa Transeau
- Spirogyra marchica H.Krieger
- Spirogyra margalefii Aboal & Llimona
- Spirogyra margaritata Wollny
- Spirogyra marocana Gauthier-Lièvre
- Spirogyra maxima (Hassall) Wittrock
- Spirogyra megaspora Transeau
- Spirogyra meinningensis
- Spirogyra meridionalis W.J.Zhu & Zhong
- Spirogyra miamiana Taft
- Spirogyra microdictyon C.-C.Jao & Hu
- Spirogyra microgranulata C.-C.Jao
- Spirogyra micropunctata Transeau
- Spirogyra microspora C.-C.Jao
- Spirogyra mienningensis L.-C.Li
- Spirogyra minor (Schmidle) Transeau
- Spirogyra minuticrassoidea Yamagishi
- Spirogyra minutifossa C.-C.Jao
- Spirogyra mirabilis (Hassall) Kützing
- Spirogyra miranda Kadlubowska
- Spirogyra mirifica Zheng & Ling
- Spirogyra mithalaensis A.M.Verma & B.Kumari
- Spirogyra moebii Transeau
- Spirogyra monodiana Gauthier-Lièvre
- Spirogyra montserrati Margalef
- Spirogyra multiconjugata N.C.Ferrer & E.J.Cáceres
- Spirogyra multiformis Kadlubowska
- Spirogyra multistrata Zheng & Ling
- Spirogyra multitrata Zheng & Ling
- Spirogyra mutabilis C.-C.Jao & H.J.Hu
- Spirogyra narcissiana Transeau
- Spirogyra natchita Transeau
- Spirogyra nawaschinii Kasanowsky
- Spirogyra neglecta (Hassall) Kützing
- Spirogyra neorhizobranchialis C.-C.Jao & Zheng
- Spirogyra nitida (O.F.Müller) Leiblein
- Spirogyra nodifera O.Bock & W.Bock
- Spirogyra notabilis Taft
- Spirogyra nova-angliae Transeau
- Spirogyra novae-angliae Transeau
- Spirogyra nyctigama Taft
- Spirogyra oblata C.-C.Jao
- Spirogyra oblonga Liu
- Spirogyra obovata C.-C.Jao
- Spirogyra occidentalis (Transeau) Czurda
- Spirogyra oligocarpa C.-C.Jao
- Spirogyra olivascens Rabenhorst
- Spirogyra ollicola C.-C.Jao & Zhong
- Spirogyra oltmannsii Huber-Pestalozzi
- Spirogyra orientalis West & G.S.West
- Spirogyra orthospira Nägeli
- Spirogyra ouarsenica Gauthier-Lièvre
- Spirogyra oudhensis Randhawa
- Spirogyra ovigera Montagne
- Spirogyra pachyderma Gauthier-Lièvre
- Spirogyra palghatensis Erady
- Spirogyra paludosa Czurda
- Spirogyra papulata C.-C.Jao
- Spirogyra paradoxa Bhashyakarla Rao
- Spirogyra paraguayensis O.Borge
- Spirogyra parva (Hassall) Kützing
- Spirogyra parvispora H.C.Wood
- Spirogyra parvula (Transeau) Czurda
- Spirogyra pascheriana Czurda
- Spirogyra patliputri A.M.Verma & B.Kumari
- Spirogyra peipeingensis C.-C.Jao
- Spirogyra pellucida (Hassall) Kützing
- Spirogyra perforans Transeau
- Spirogyra plena (West & G.S.West) Czurda
- Spirogyra poljanskii Kadlubowska
- Spirogyra polymorpha Kirchner
- Spirogyra polytaeniata Strasburger
- Spirogyra porangabae Transeau
- Spirogyra porticalis (O.F.Müller) Dumortier- type
- Spirogyra pratensis Transeau
- Spirogyra princeps (Vaucher) Link ex Meyen
- Spirogyra proavita Langer
- Spirogyra prolifica Kamat
- Spirogyra propria Transeau
- Spirogyra protecta H.C.Wood
- Spirogyra pseudoaedaloides Kadlubowska
- Spirogyra pseudobellis W.J.Zhu & Zhong
- Spirogyra pseudocorrugata Gauthier-Lièvre
- Spirogyra pseudocylindrica Prescott
- Spirogyra pseudogibberosa Gauthier-Lièvre
- Spirogyra pseudogranulata S.-H.Ley
- Spirogyra pseudojuergensii H.Silva
- Spirogyra pseudomaiuscula Gauthier-Lièvre
- Spirogyra pseudomajuscula Gauthier-Lièvre
- Spirogyra pseudomaxima Kadlubowska
- Spirogyra pseudoneglecta Czurda
- Spirogyra pseudonodifera O.Bock & W.Bock
- Spirogyra pseudoplena Liu
- Spirogyra pseudopulchrata C.-C.Jao
- Spirogyra pseudoreticulata Kreiger
- Spirogyra pseudorhizopus L.J.Bi
- Spirogyra pseudosahnii Kadlubowska
- Spirogyra pseudospreeiana C.-C.Jao
- Spirogyra pseudosubreticulata Rickert & Hoshaw
- Spirogyra pseudotenuissima O.Bock & W.Bock
- Spirogyra pseudotetrapla Kadlubowska
- Spirogyra pseudotexensis Bourrelly
- Spirogyra pseudovarians Czurda
- Spirogyra pseudovenusta Liu & Wei
- Spirogyra pseudowoodii V.J.Poljanski
- Spirogyra pulchella (H.C.Wood) H.C.Wood
- Spirogyra pulchra Alexenko
- Spirogyra pulchrifigurata C.-C.Jao
- Spirogyra puncticulata C.-C.Jao
- Spirogyra punctulata C.-C.Jao
- Spirogyra quadrata (Hassall) P.Petit
- Spirogyra quadrilaminata C.-C.Jao
- Spirogyra quezelii Gauthier-Lièvre
- Spirogyra quilonensis Kothari
- Spirogyra quinina Kützing
- Spirogyra quinquilaminata C.-C.Jao
- Spirogyra randhawae Krieger
- Spirogyra rattanii Kadlubowska
- Spirogyra rectangularis Transeau
- Spirogyra rectispira Merriman
- Spirogyra regularis (Cedercreutz) Krieger
- Spirogyra reinhardii V.Chmielevsky
- Spirogyra reticulata Nordstedt
- Spirogyra reticulatum Randhawa
- Spirogyra reticuliana Randhawa
- Spirogyra rhizobrachialis C.-C.Jao
- Spirogyra rhizobranchialis C.-C.Jao
- Spirogyra rhizoides Randhawa
- Spirogyra rhizopus C.-C.Jao
- Spirogyra rhodopea Petkoff
- Spirogyra rivularis (Hassall) Rabenhorst
- Spirogyra robusta (Nygaard) Czurda
- Spirogyra rugosa (Transeau) Czurda
- Spirogyra rugulosa Iwanoff
- Spirogyra rupestris Schmidle
- Spirogyra sahnii Randhawa
- Spirogyra salina Aleem
- Spirogyra sanjingensis Y.Wang & Z.Wang
- Spirogyra sarmae M.Singh & M.Srivastava
- Spirogyra schmidtii West & G.S.West
- Spirogyra schweickerdtii Cholonky
- Spirogyra scripta Nygaard
- Spirogyra scrobiculata (Stockmayer) Czurda
- Spirogyra sculpta Gauthier-Lièvre
- Spirogyra semiornata C.-C.Jao
- Spirogyra senegalensis Gauthier-Lièvre
- Spirogyra setiformis (Roth) Martens ex Meneghini
- Spirogyra shantungensis L.-C.Li
- Spirogyra shanxiensis Zheng & Ling
- Spirogyra shenzaensis Zheng
- Spirogyra siamensis Transeau
- Spirogyra siberica Skvortzov
- Spirogyra silesiaca Kadlubowska
- Spirogyra sinensis L.-C.Li
- Spirogyra singularis Nordstedt
- Spirogyra skujae Randhawa
- Spirogyra skvortzowii Willi Kreiger
- Spirogyra smithii Transeau
- Spirogyra speciosa Liu
- Spirogyra sphaerica (Misra) Willi Krieger
- Spirogyra sphaerocarpa C.-C.Jao
- Spirogyra sphaerospora Hirn
- Spirogyra spinescens Kirjakov
- Spirogyra splendida G.S West
- Spirogyra spreeiana Rabenhorst
- Spirogyra subaffinis F.E.Fritsch & M.F.Rich
- Spirogyra subbullata Kadlubowska
- Spirogyra subcolligata L.J.Bi
- Spirogyra subcrassa Woronchin
- Spirogyra subcrassiuscula L.J.Bi
- Spirogyra subcylindrospora C.-C.Jao
- Spirogyra subechinata Godward
- Spirogyra subfossulata C.-C.Jao
- Spirogyra subglabra Zheng & Ling
- Spirogyra sublambertiana Zhao
- Spirogyra subluteospora C.-C.Jao & Hu
- Spirogyra submajuscula Ling & Zheng
- Spirogyra submargaritata Godward
- Spirogyra submarina (Collins) Transeau
- Spirogyra submaxima Transeau
- Spirogyra subobovata Chian
- Spirogyra subpapulatata C.-C.Jao
- Spirogyra subpellucida C.-C.Jao
- Spirogyra subpolytaeniata C.-C.Jao
- Spirogyra subpratensis Woronichin
- Spirogyra subreflexa Liang & Wang
- Spirogyra subreticulata F.E.Fritsch
- Spirogyra subsalina Cedercreutz
- Spirogyra subsalsa Kützing
- Spirogyra subsalso-punctatulata Kadlubowska
- Spirogyra subtropica Chian
- Spirogyra suburbana C.-C.Jao
- Spirogyra subvelata Kreiger
- Spirogyra sulcata Blum
- Spirogyra sundanensis Gauthier-Lièvre
- Spirogyra superba L.Liu
- Spirogyra supervarians Transeau
- Spirogyra szechwanensis C.-C.Jao
- Spirogyra taftiana Transeau
- Spirogyra taiyuanensis Ling
- Spirogyra tandae Randhawa
- Spirogyra taylorii C.-C.Jao
- Spirogyra tenuior (Transeau) Krieger
- Spirogyra tenuispina Rundina
- Spirogyra tenuissima (Hassall) Kützing
- Spirogyra teodoresci Transeau
- Spirogyra ternata Ripart
- Spirogyra tetrapla Transeau
- Spirogyra tibetensis C.-C.Jao
- Spirogyra tjibodensis Faber
- Spirogyra tolosana Comère
- Spirogyra torta Blum
- Spirogyra trachycarpa Skuja
- Spirogyra transeauiana C.-C.Jao
- Spirogyra triplicata (Collins) Transeau
- Spirogyra trochainii Gauthier-Lièvre
- Spirogyra tropica Kützing
- Spirogyra tsingtaoensis L.-C.Li
- Spirogyra tuberculata Lagerheim
- Spirogyra tuberculosa Liang & Wang
- Spirogyra tucumaniae B.Tracanna
- Spirogyra tumida C.-C.Jao
- Spirogyra turfosa F.Gay
- Spirogyra tuwensis R.J.Patel & C.K.Asok Kumar
- Spirogyra ugandense Gauthier-Lièvre
- Spirogyra unduliseptum Randhawa
- Spirogyra urbana C.-C.Jao & Zhong
- Spirogyra van-zantenii Cholonky
- Spirogyra variabilis C.-C.Jao & Hu
- Spirogyra varians (Hassall) Kützing
- Spirogyra variaspora Rickert & Hoshaw
- Spirogyra variformis Transeau
- Spirogyra varshaii Prasad & Dutta
- Spirogyra vasishtii Rattan
- Spirogyra velata Nordstedt
- Spirogyra venkataramanii Rattan
- Spirogyra venosa Kadlubowska
- Spirogyra venusta C.-C.Jao
- Spirogyra vermiculata C.-C.Jao & H.J.Hu
- Spirogyra verrucogranulata I.C A.Dias & C.E.de M.Bicudo
- Spirogyra verrucosa (C.B.Rao) Krieger
- Spirogyra verruculosa C.-C.Jao
- Spirogyra voltaica Gauthier-Lièvre
- Spirogyra wangii L.C.Li
- Spirogyra weberi Kützing
- Spirogyra weishuiensis Ling & Zheng
- Spirogyra weletischii West & G.S.West
- Spirogyra welwitschii West & G.S.West
- Spirogyra westii Transeau
- Spirogyra willei Skuja
- Spirogyra wittrockii Alexenko
- Spirogyra wollnyi De Toni
- Spirogyra wrightiana Transeau
- Spirogyra wuchanensis C.-C.Jao & H.-J.Hu
- Spirogyra wuhanensis C.-C.Jao & H.-J.Hu
- Spirogyra xiaoganensis Liu
- Spirogyra xinxiangensis L.J.Bi
- Spirogyra yexianensis L.J.Bi
- Spirogyra yuin S.Skinner & Entwisle
- Spirogyra yunnanensis L.-C.Li C

== In popular culture ==
Jay Beckenstein chose the name he "ran across in a textbook" for his long-running jazz fusion band Spyro Gyra while studying at the Biology at the University of Buffalo. “It began as a joke. I said ‘spirogyra,’ [the club owner the band played Tuesday nights] misspelled it,"

It is also the subject of the Brazilian Samba rock song "Spirogyra story" by Jorge Ben.

== Gallery ==
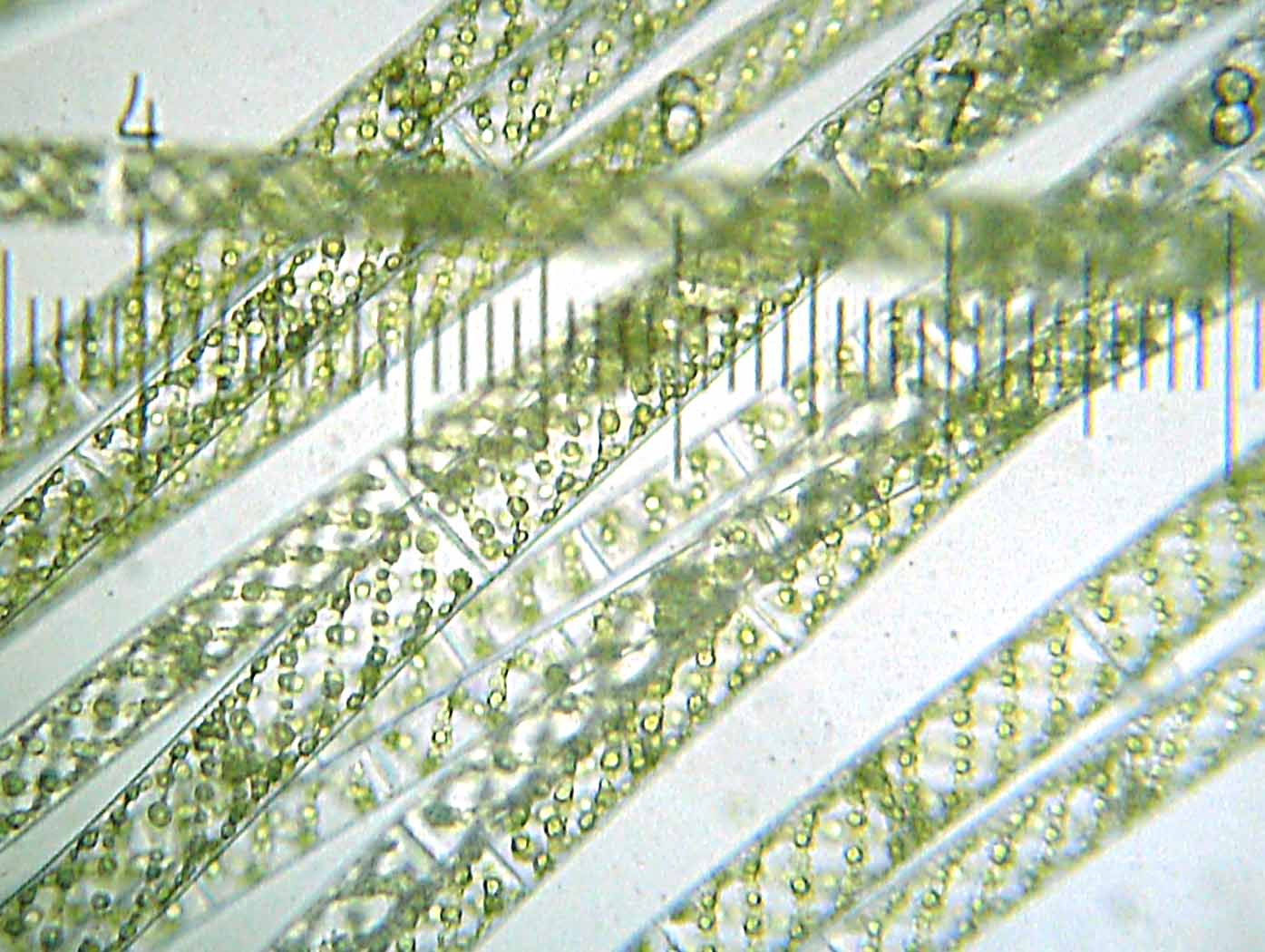
Spirogyra

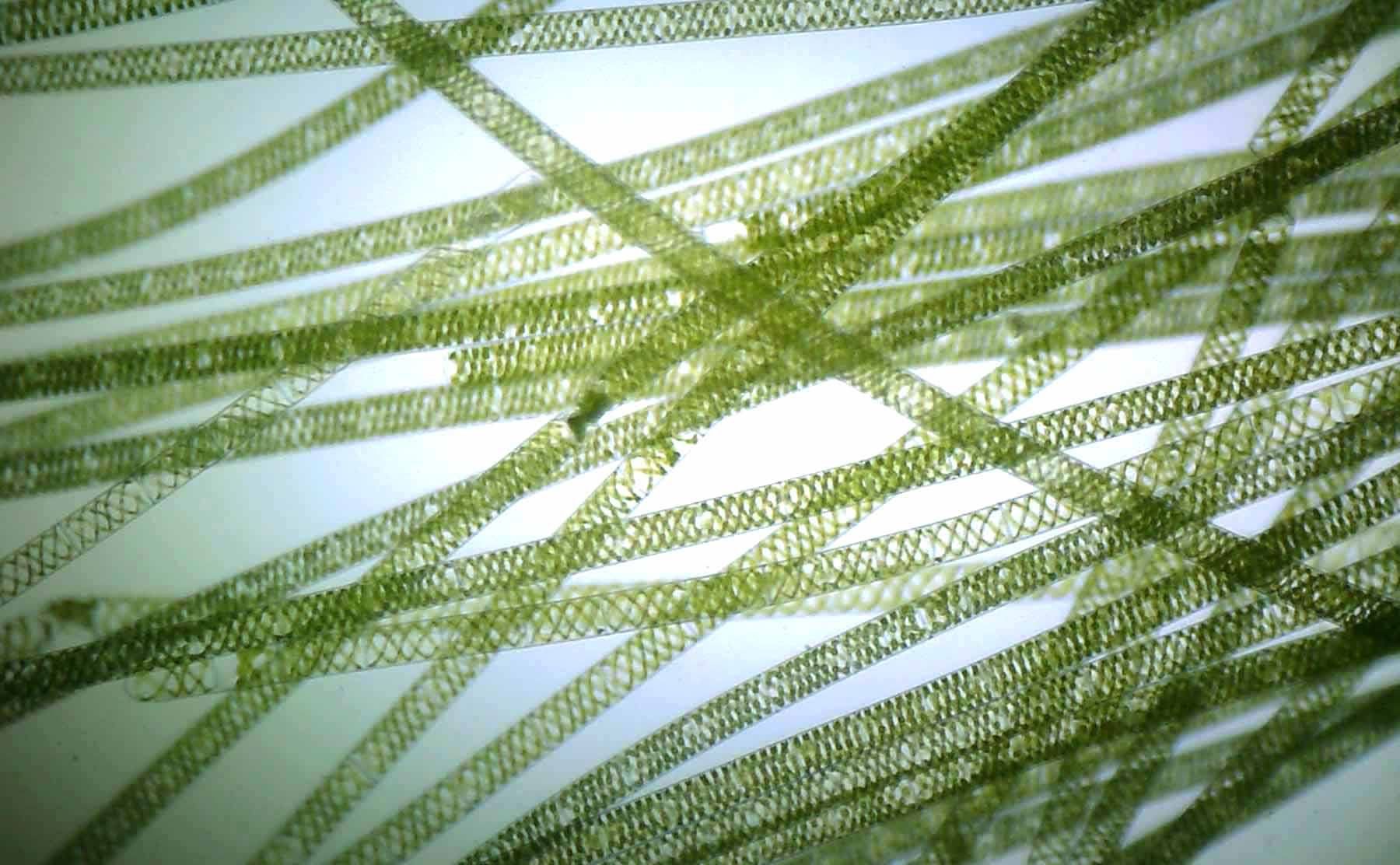
Spirogyra

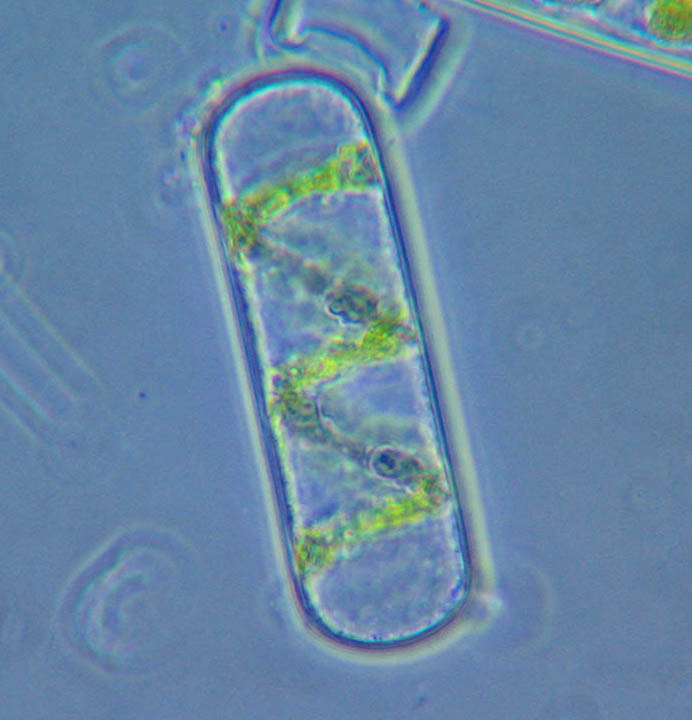
Single Spirogyra cell

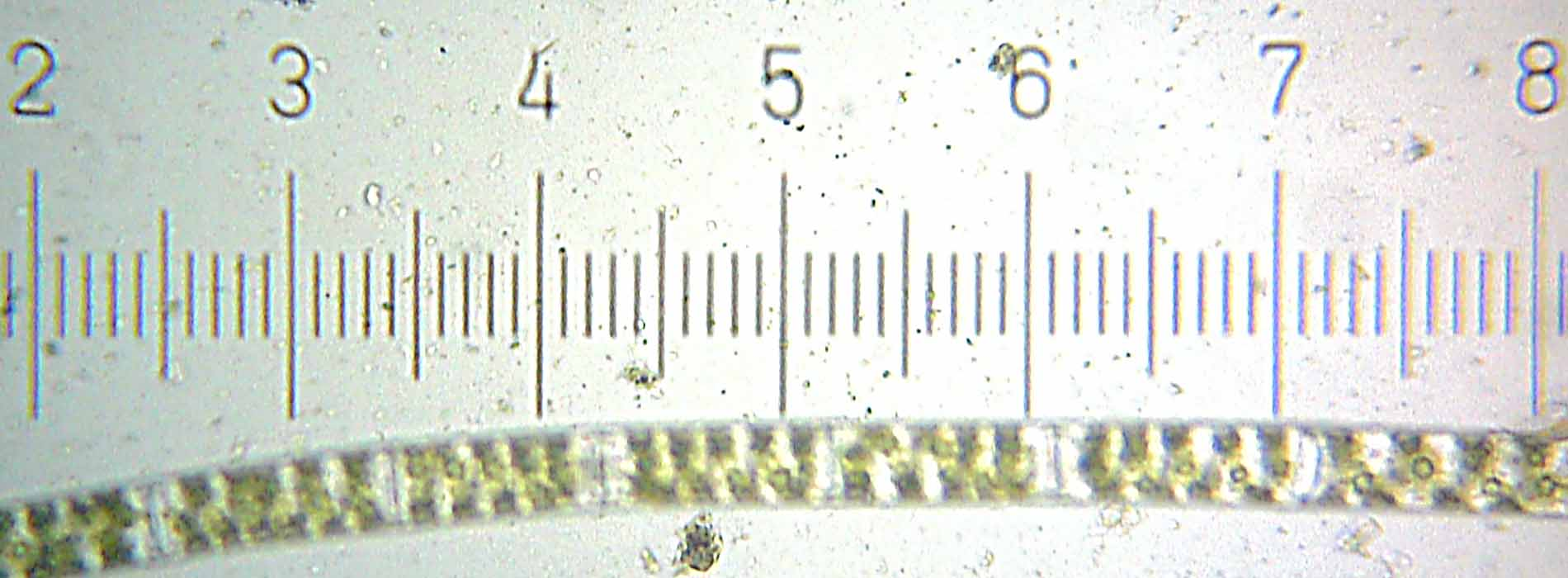
Spirogyra (Each numbered tick = 122 μm)

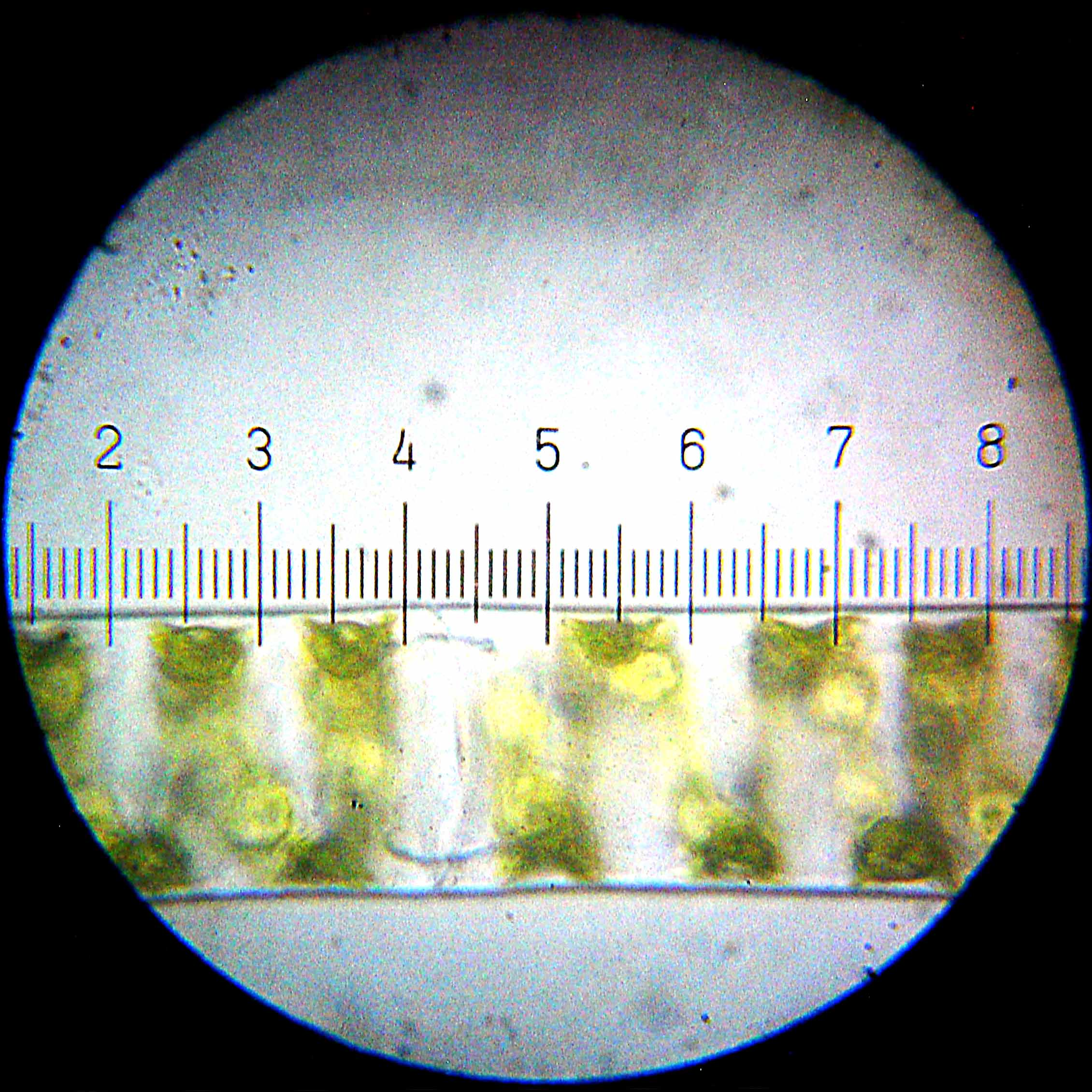
Spirogyra (Each numbered tick = 20 μm)

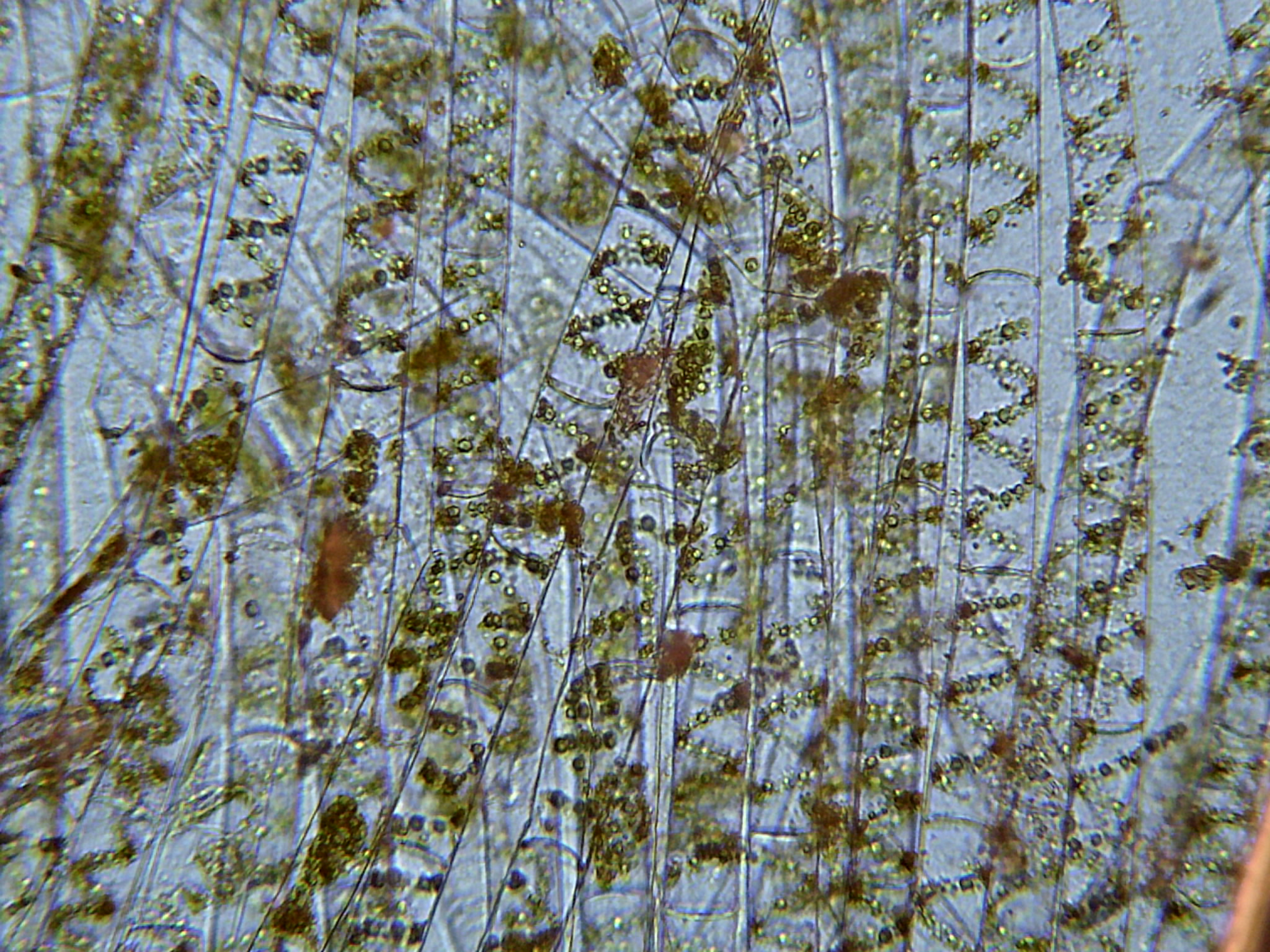
Patch of Spirogyra from algal blooming in Westfalian pond

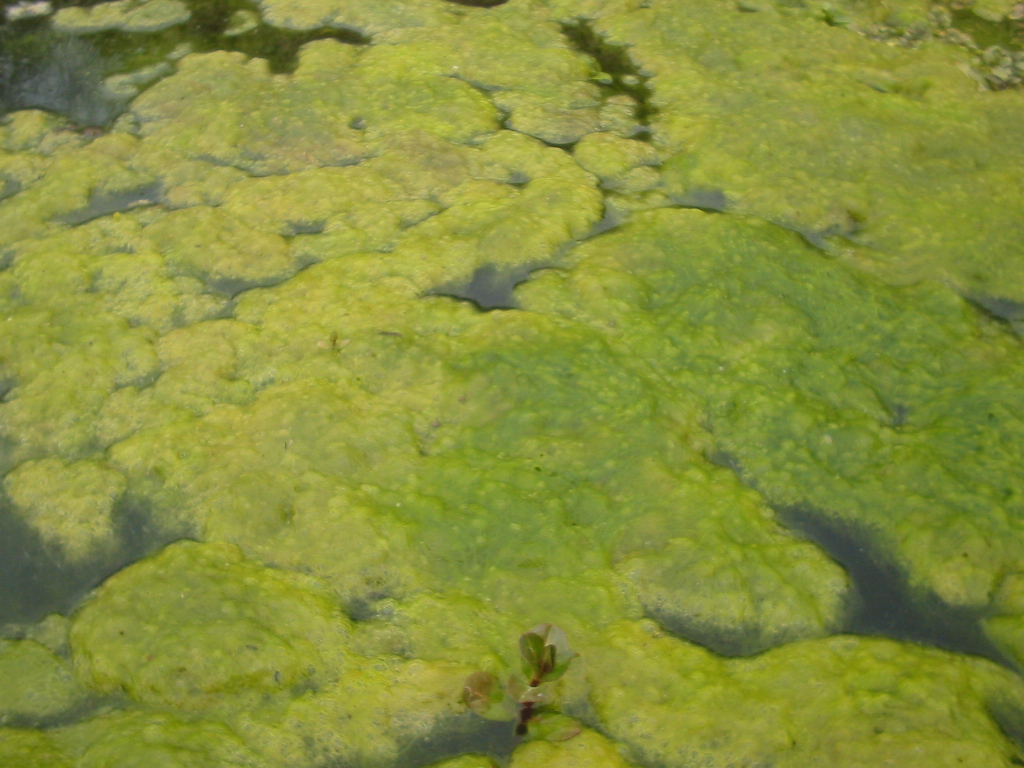
Spirogyra algal bloom in Romanian pond
