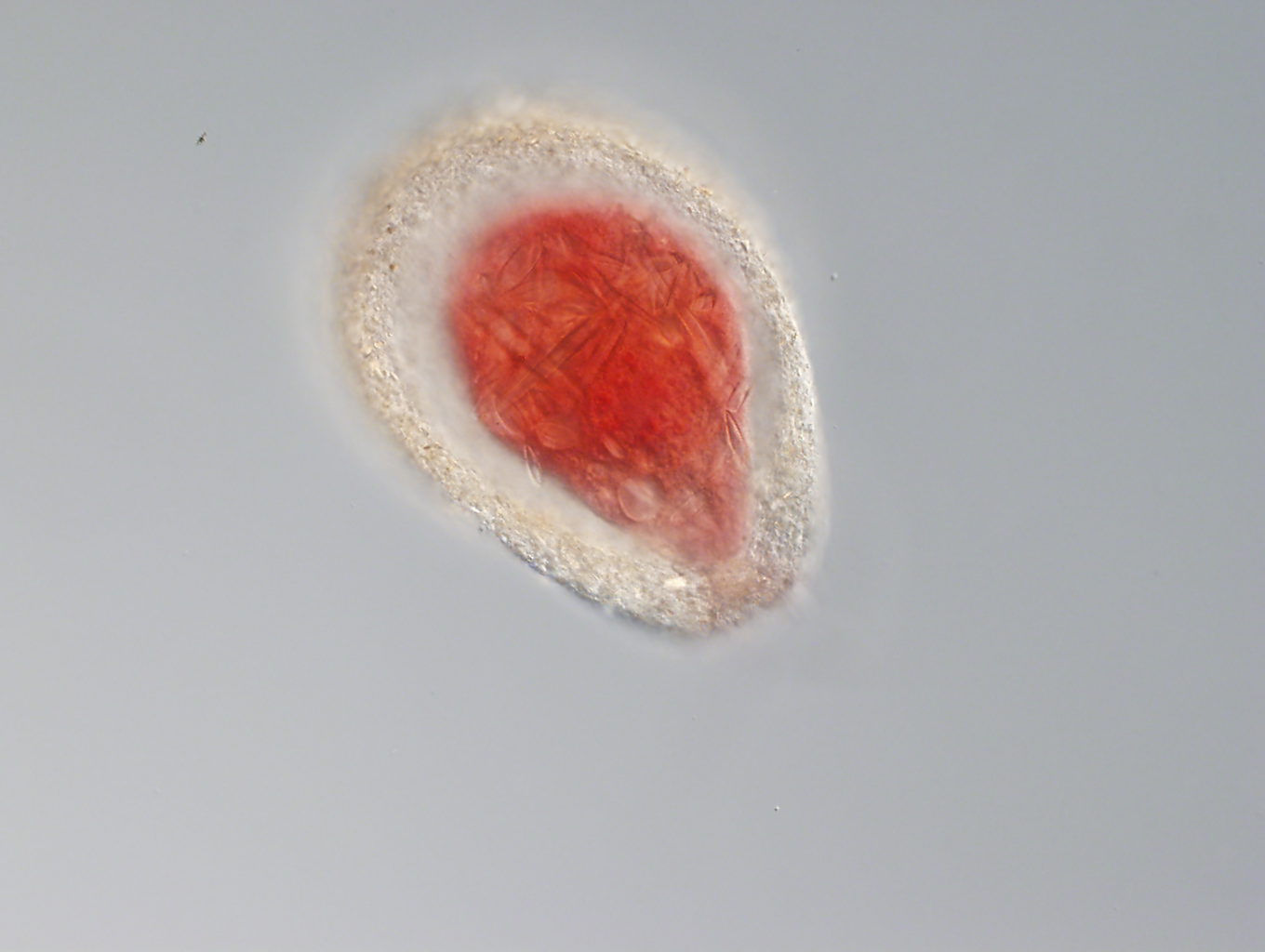
- Gromia brunneri

Scientific classification
- Domain: Eukaryota
- Supergroup: Rhizaria
- Phylum: Cercozoa
- Subphylum: Endomyxa; Cavalier-Smith 2002, emend. Cavalier-Smith in Bass et al. 2009

Subgroups
- Marimyxia; Ascetosporea; Gromia; Filoreta; Phytorhiza; Vampyrellida; Phytomyxea; Heliomorpha; Viscidocauda

= Endomyxa =

Group of single-celled organisms

Endomyxa is a group of eukaryotic organisms in the supergroup Rhizaria. It is a subphylum of Cercozoa.
