= 2025 Kerala amoebic meningoencephalitis outbreak =

Surge of amoebic meningoencephalitis in Kerala

- Disease: Amoebic meningoencephalitis
- Pathogen: Free-living amoebae (usually Naegleria fowleri in primary amoebic meningoencephalitis)
- Location: Kerala, India
- Date: 2025
- Confirmed cases: 170 (as of 27 November 2025)
- Deaths: 42 (as of 27 November 2025)

The 2025 Kerala amoebic meningoencephalitis outbreak was a reported surge in cases of amoebic meningoencephalitis (commonly described in media as infection by a "brain-eating amoeba") in the Indian state of Kerala during 2025. The condition most frequently associated with such reporting is primary amoebic meningoencephalitis, a rare but nearly always fatal infection of the brain caused by the free-living amoeba Naegleria fowleri.

As of 27 November 2025, the Government of India reported 170 confirmed cases and 42 deaths in Kerala for the year. Cumulative totals reported earlier in 2025 were lower, as case investigations and classifications were still evolving.

== Background ==
Amoebic meningoencephalitis mainly refers to primary amoebic meningoencephalitis, a rare infection of the brain caused by the free-living amoeba Naegleria fowleri. The amoeba infects humans when contaminated water enters the nose, from which it migrates to the brain along the olfactory nerve; the infection cannot spread from person to person and is not acquired by swallowing contaminated water. Symptoms begin with headache, fever, nausea, and vomiting and can progress rapidly to stiff neck, confusion, seizures, and coma; once they appear, the disease is nearly always fatal within days.

== Outbreak ==
Kerala health authorities issued technical guidance in 2024 after reporting cases in the state, describing sporadic primary amoebic meningoencephalitis cases over the preceding decade and suggesting clinical suspicion, laboratory testing, and rapid initiation of treatment protocols in suspected cases.

In November 2024, the Government of Kerala issued a revised, One Health-oriented action plan and technical guidance, referencing the need for public awareness, diagnostic strengthening, case surveillance, and environmental monitoring related to free-living amoebae.

=== 2025 case counts ===
The Government of India reported the following year-wise totals for Kerala (as of 27 November 2025):

Reported amoebic meningoencephalitis cases and deaths in Kerala
Year	Cases	Deaths	Notes
2023	2	2	Government of India (Lok Sabha reply)
2024	39	9	Government of India (Lok Sabha reply)
2025	170	42	As of 27 November 2025 (Lok Sabha reply)

=== Contributing factors ===
Kerala’s 2024 guidance noted that warmer water temperatures and greater recreational freshwater exposure increase the likelihood of contact with thermophilic amoebae such as N. fowleri, and flagged climate change as a long-term concern.

State officials also attributed part of the apparent increase to improved detection. Revised investigation protocols meant that cases previously recorded under broader categories such as encephalitis were now being classified specifically as PAM.

== Response ==
=== State response ===
Kerala’s November 2024 One Health action plan included year-round public awareness campaigns that would intensify before summer. Measures include an improved laboratory capacity for microscopy and molecular testing of free-living amoebae, active case surveillance that includes exposure history and rapid testing of cerebrospinal fluid and environmental surveillance and hotspot mapping to monitor water quality and the presence of free-living amoebae in affected areas.

In September 2025, Kerala officials increased testing and implemented measures such as chlorination of wells, water tanks, and public bathing areas.

In November 2025, Kerala’s Health Department announced a joint field-level study with experts from the Indian Council of Medical Research National Institute of Epidemiology, beginning in Kozhikode and extending to additional districts, together with public prevention guidance focused on reducing nasal exposure to untreated water.

=== National response ===
The National Centre for Disease Control conducted epidemiological assessments and reinforced surveillance. India’s national Communicable Disease alert on primary amoebic meningoencephalitis was revised in October 2024 to address management and prevention measures.
