= Facultative parasite =

Relationship between organisms

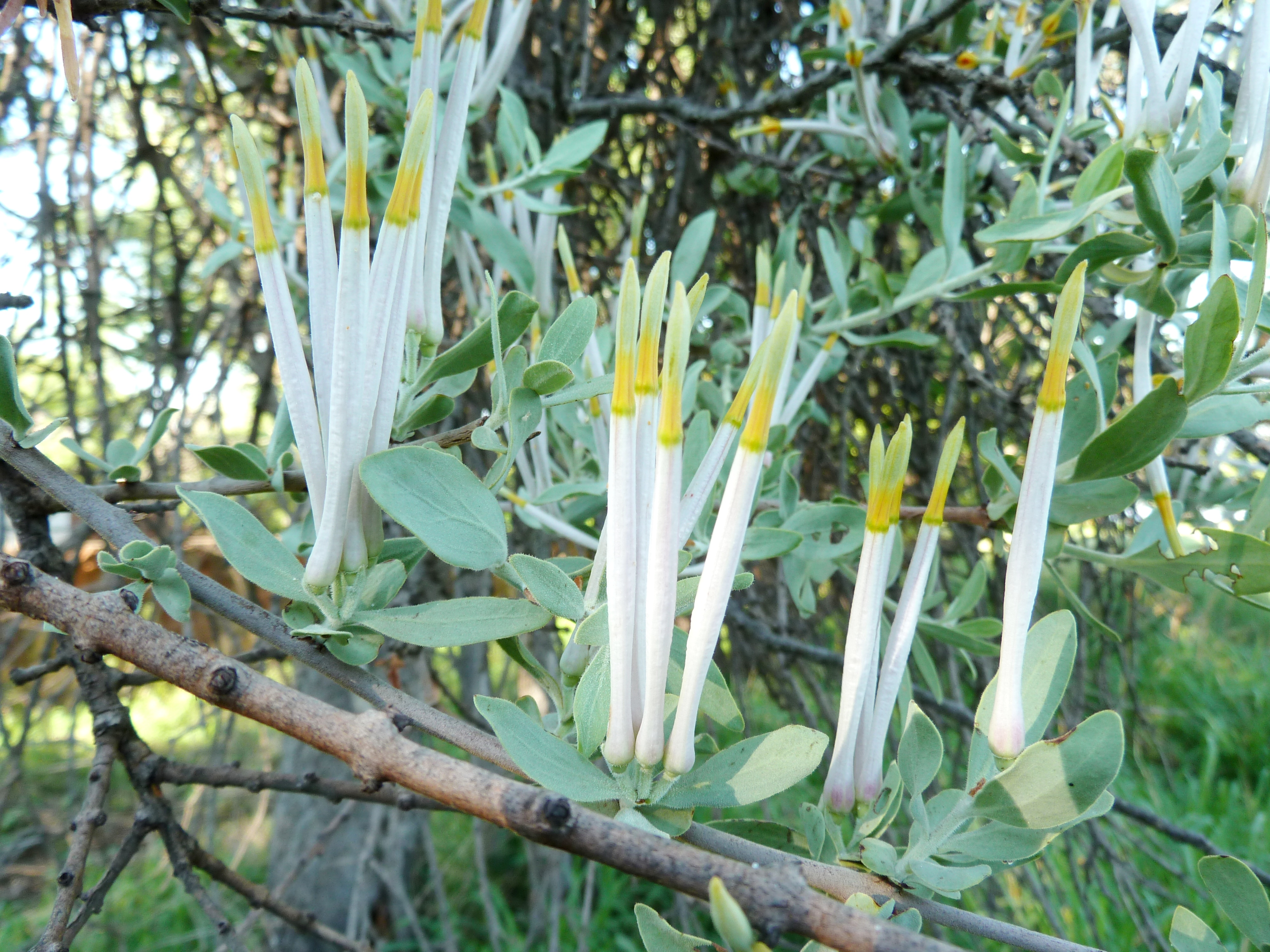
Buds of Agelanthus natalitius growing on an Acacia caffra tree at Seringveld near Pretoria, South Africa.

A facultative parasite is an organism that may resort to parasitic activity, but does not absolutely rely on any host for completion of its life cycle.

== Examples of facultative parasitism ==
Examples of facultative parasitism occur among many species of fungi, such as family members of the genus Armillaria. Armillaria species do parasitise living trees, but if the tree dies, whether as a consequence of the fungal infection or not, the fungus continues to eat the wood without further need for parasitic activity; some species even can ingest dead wood without any parasitic activity at all. As such, although they also are important ecological agents in the process of nutrient recycling by microbial decomposition, the fungi become pests in their role as destructive agents of wood rot.

Similarly, green plants in genera such as Rhinanthus and Osyris can grow independently of any host, but they also act opportunistically as facultative root parasites of neighboring green plants.

Among animals, facultatively kleptoparasitic species generally can survive by hunting or scavenging for themselves, but it often is more profitable for them to rob food from other animals kleptoparasitically, whether their hosts are of the same species or not. Such behavior occurs in lions and hyenas for example, and also among insects such as "Jackal flies" in the family Milichiidae.

More intimately, normally free-living microbes may opportunistically live as facultative parasites in other organisms.

An example of this in humans is Naegleria fowleri - this percolozoan amoeboflagellate species is a free-living bacterivore, but occasionally it successfully infects humans with an often fatal result.

== See also ==
- Parasitism
- Parasitoid
- Obligate parasite
