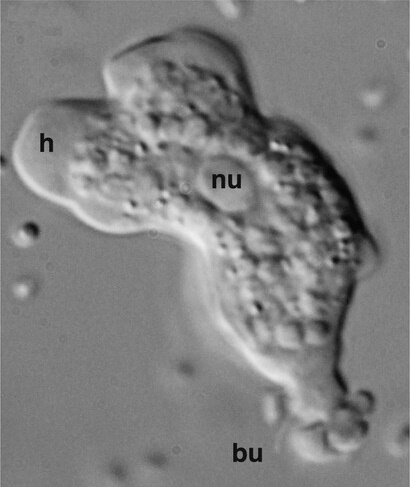
- Light micrograph of N. lustrarea showing eruptive hyaline pseudopodia (h), bulbus uroid (bu) and a large single nucleus (nu).

Scientific classification
- Domain: Eukaryota
- Clade: Discoba
- Phylum: Percolozoa
- Class: Eutetramitea
- Order: Naegleriida
- Family: Naegleriidae
- Genus: Naegleria
- Species: N. lustrarea

Binomial name
- Naegleria lustrarea Becker & Silberman, 2024

Type strain
- CCAP 1518/36

= Naegleria lustrarea =

Species of amoebae

Naegleria lustrarea is a species of free-living amoeba belonging to the group Heterolobosea. It was described in 2024 from amoebae present in the gut of a salamander found in Arkansas. It is an amoeboflagellate, capable of transitioning from an amoeboid stage to a flagellate stage during its life cycle.

== Etymology ==
The specific epithet lustraea is a Latin derivative of "to transit", as it is still unknown if the amoeba is an active inhabitant of the salamander gut or is merely passing through it.

== Taxonomy ==
Type locality of Naegleria lustrarea

Naegleria lustrarea was discovered from the feces of a healthy female ringed salamander (Ambystoma annulatum) native to Arkansas, USA. Fecal samples were deposited in an agar plate with an Escherichia coli lawn. This plate was incubated until amoebae began generating a feeding front. These amoebae were promptly isolated and observed under microscopy. Their DNA was sequenced and through a phylogenetic analysis the amoebae were identified as members of the genus Naegleria. Researchers Brian M. Becker and Jeffrey D. Silberman described the amoebae as members of a new species and published the results with various coauthors in the Journal of Eukaryotic Microbiology.

== Description ==
Naegleria lustrarea is a species of amoebae, single-celled protists that generate pseudopodia. Each cell contains one nucleus with a large central nucleolus. During their life cycle they mainly exist as amoeboid trophozoites whose nuclei are ringed and contain refractile granules. These amoeba move attaching to the substrate with eruptive pseudopodia and, occasionally, leave cytoplasmic filaments and a bulbus uroid trailing behind. The amoeboid stages can transition into fast swimming flagellate stages, composed of elongated pear-shaped cells that move by using two equal-length flagella. The flagellate cells have a nucleus in the anterior region, possibly associated to the flagellar apparatus, and a contractile vacuole in the posterior region.
