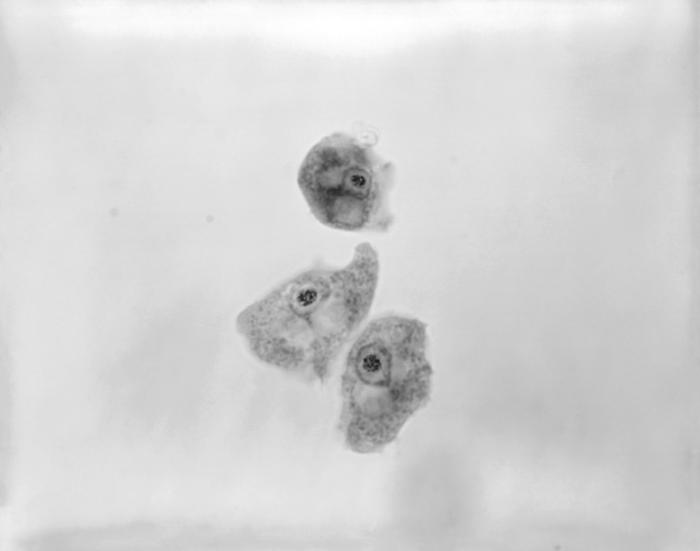

Scientific classification
- Domain: Eukaryota
- Phylum: Percolozoa
- Class: Heterolobosea
- Order: Schizopyrenida
- Family: Vahlkampfiidae
- Genus: Naegleria
- Species: N. gruberi

Binomial name
- Naegleria gruberi (Schardinger, 1899)

= Naegleria gruberi =

Species of protist

Naegleria gruberi is a species of Naegleria. It is famous for its ability to change from an amoeba, which lacks a cytoplasmic microtubule cytoskeleton, to a flagellate, which has an elaborate microtubule cytoskeleton, including flagella. This "transformation" includes de novo synthesis of basal bodies (or centrioles).

== Background ==
It was first characterized in 1899, and the genome sequence published in 2010.

Naegleria gruberi is a non-pathogenic biosafety level 1 organism, although it is related to the deadly Naegleria fowleri.

Naegleria gruberi is a free-living organism that can be extracted from wet soil and freshwater The strain NEG-M is the only Naegleria species that has a fully sequenced genome. Naegleria belongs to the Jakobids, Euglenozoans, and Heteroloboseans (JEH) group. The Naegleria genome sequence has indicated that the amoeboflagellate contains actin and microtubule cytoskeletons, mitotic and meiotic machinery, and several transcription factors. Naegleria's mitochondrial genome encodes some components of a mitochondrial c and c1 maturation system.

Naegleria's mitochondria resemble the evolutionary intermediate thought to have occurred within the ancestor of all eukaryotes, because of its presence of mitochondrial Fe-hydrogenase and complete aerobic respiration system. The Naegleria genome is able to oxidize glucose, various amino acids and fatty acids through the Krebs cycle.

The ancestor of existing eukaryotes have been thought to contain a fair number of introns. Nearly 36% of Naegleria genes are assumed to contain at least one intron and 17% contain multiple introns. The position of the introns are conserved, indicating that they are ancient.

Naegleria amoeba undergo a closed mitosis, in which the nuclear envelope doesn't break down, but still proceeds through the typical stages. The multitubulin hypothesis predicts that eukaryotes contain multiple tublin genes with distinct properties. Naegleria uses different tubulins for mitosis and flagellar assembly.

Observations suggest that Naegleria is primarily an asexual organism that reproduces by division of its amoebae to produce substantial clonal populations. However, analysis of the genome strain NEG-M revealed that it is a composite of two distinct haplotypes having arisen from an interbreeding population. Therefore, Naegleria is likely to be able to undergo genetic exchange. The NEG-M strain is the heterozygous result of a past mating of two strains, and it appears genetically equipped to mate again. However, further studies still need to be performed.
