= Naegleria lovaniensis =

Scientific classification
- Domain: Eukaryota
- Phylum: Percolozoa
- Class: Heterolobosea
- Order: Schizopyrenida
- Family: Vahlkampfiidae
- Genus: Naegleria
- Species: N. lovaniensis

Binomial name
- Naegleria lovaniensis Stevens, De Jonckheere & Willaert, 1980

Species of protist

Naegleria lovaniensis is a species of Naegleria. It is considered non-pathogenic.
