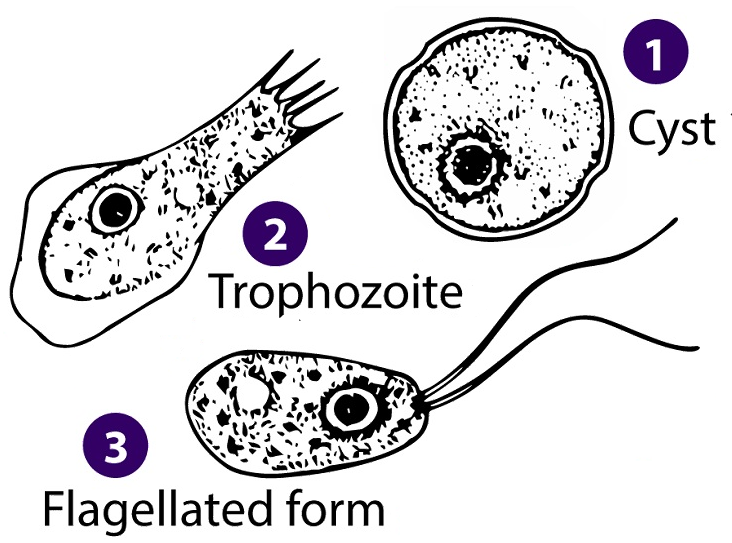
- Different stages of Naegleria fowleri

Scientific classification
- Domain: Eukaryota
- (unranked): incertae sedis
- Clade: Discoba
- Phylum: Heterolobosea
- Class: Eutetramitea
- Order: Naegleriida
- Family: Naegleriidae
- Genus: Naegleria; Alexis Alexeieff, 1912

Lower Taxonomic Units (I.e: Species)
- See ‘Species’ under “Description” in this page

= Naegleria =

Genus of protists

Naegleria /nɛˈɡlɪəriə/ is a genus consisting of 47 described species of protozoa often found in warm aquatic environments as well as soil habitats worldwide. It has three life cycle forms: the amoeboid stage, the cyst stage, and the flagellated stage, and has been routinely studied for its ease in change from amoeboid to flagellated stages. This genera became famous when Naegleria fowleri, the causative agent of the usually fatal human and animal disease primary amoebic meningoencephalitis (PAM), was discovered in 1965. Most species in the genus, however, are incapable of causing disease.

== Etymology ==
The genus Naegleria is named after the German protozoologist, Kurt Nägler.

== History ==
In 1899, Franz Schardinger discovered an amoeba that had the ability to transform into a flagellated stage. He named the organism Amoeba gruberi, which was later changed to the genus Naegleria in 1912 by Alexeieff. Before 1970, N. gruberi was generally used as a model organism to study the changes from amoeboid to flagellated stages. However it garnered much more attention when a human pathogenic species (N. fowleri) was discovered in Australia in 1965, and described in 1970.

== Habitat and ecology ==
Naegleria is found worldwide in typically aerobic warm aquatic environments (freshwater such as lakes and rivers) and soil habitats. As a typically free living genus, they feed via phagocytosis on various bacteria species and can be maintained on a diet consisting solely of Escherichia coli K12. The few species that are pathogenic seem to be thermophilic, preferring warmer temperatures such as those in nuclear power plant cooling systems. One species, Naegleria fowleri, can be an opportunistic and usually fatal pathogen of humans if it enters the nasal cavity.

== Description ==
=== Morphology/anatomy ===
Naegleria are free-living amoebae, with some species being opportunistic pathogens. Cells range from 10-25 um depending on the life stage it is currently in. Species are not classified morphologically anymore but historically have been by flagellar shape. New species are often defined by ribosomal DNA sequences. The unicellular organism's cytoplasm has distinct separations of an ectoplasm (outer) and endoplasm (inner). An aerobic organism, it has many mitochondria in the endoplasm. The endoplasm also contains ribosomes, food vacuoles, contractile filaments/vacuoles, and protoplasmic filaments. Notably, the Golgi apparatus is not visibly identifiable even though the amoeba expresses Golgi-associated enzymes. It has a nucleus with a prominent nucleolus.

=== Life cycles ===
Naegleria has 3 different life cycle stages: amoebae, cyst, and flagellate.

The amoebae stage is the feeding stage and has blunt pseudopodia (lobopodia) that give the cell an overall irregular, yet generally cylindrical shape. The overall size is usually around 10–20 um at this stage. The pseudopodia are actin driven extensions of the body and form at irregular regions of the cell. Movement occurs in this stage via extending the pseudopodia, and having the cytoplasmic internal contents follow subsequently. As the feeding stage of the organism, pseudopodia are also used to engulf prey, such as bacteria. This is also the stage that the organism spends the most time in, and also the reproductive phase. Reproduction occurs here by binary fission and it can reproduce every 1.6 hours on a bacterial diet. Reproductive division involves promitosis, or intranuclear mitosis, which does not occur with nuclear envelope breakdown. Sexual reproduction has not been observed in this genus but the genes for meiosis do exist in the genome.

The cyst stage is a double walled spherical stage. The double wall consists of a thick endocyst and a thin endocyst. The cyst contains usually 2-8 pores (often depending on the species) and is formed when conditions become adverse, such as residing in non optimal temperature. Cysts are favourable as they are naturally resistant to environmental hardships. When adverse conditions are restored to normal, the organism can escape the cyst through the pores in its amoeboid form. Cysts have been observed to be formed in all but one species where the ability to form a cyst is inhibited by a bacterial parasite.

The flagellate stage consists of two flagella which are induced by de novo assembly of a primarily microtubule cytoskeleton from a former actin based cytoskeleton (from the amoeboid form). The microtubule skeleton is prominent along with the development of basal bodies. The entire flagellar structure consists of 200 proteins. Division of the organism does not occur in this life stage, although two species have been found to divide as an exception. There is no cytostome (feeding groove) present suggesting that feeding occurs primarily in the amoeboid stage via phagocytosis. There is a single nucleus which is near the flagellar root. The flagellated stage is typically encountered when the genus needs to move to a more desirable location, which is often encountered when conditions are not optimal. Therefore, this flagellated stage is transient and the organism usually reverts to the amoeboid form within an hour, with transformation taking about 100 minutes. The reversion to the amoeboid form can be induced by changes in ionic concentration of the water it resides in (such as placing it in distilled water); during which transformation the cell disassembles its microtubules. Notably, five species have never been observed in this flagellate life stage.

=== Genetics ===
The genome of Naegleria gruberi has been sequenced and consists of a 41 Mb nuclear genome with 15,727 protein-coding genes. It has a 33% GC content, and 57.8% of the genome is coding with about 36% consisting of introns. This suggests a mean of about 0.7 introns per gene. There are at least 12 chromosomes present. About 1% of the genes have homology to bacterial genes suggesting that lateral gene transfer may have occurred at some point. The genome also notably contains the required genes for Golgi but it is visibly lacking. Although only seen to be asexual, meiotic genes are also present.

Compared to other protists, Naegleria also has a larger set of mitochondrial genes with about a 50 kb mitochondrial genome. The mitochondrial genome clearly encodes for aerobic respiration which is seen through its ability to perform oxidative phosphorylation and use oxygen as a terminal electron acceptor. Remarkably the organism's genome also encodes for an elaborate anaerobic metabolism such as substrate-level phosphorylation and an ability to use fumarate as the terminal electron acceptor. This anaerobic system is hypothesized to be used in slightly anoxic muddy environments during the cyst life stage.

The genus Naegleria's ribosomal DNA (rDNA) consists of an extrachromosomal plasmid of which about 4000 exist in each cell. Comparison of 5.8S rDNA is the current way of molecularly classifying new species. Species can also be distinguished by their internal transcribed spacers type 2 (ITS2) sequences.

=== Relationship with humans ===
One species of Naegleria is known to be a deadly pathogen to humans – Naegleria fowleri. It is typically a free living thermophile, but is a deadly parasite if it encounters the right host. Besides being found in freshwater, it can also be found in warm water of industrial plants, as well as poorly chlorinated swimming pools. It enters through the nose of the host (who is typically found to be in contact through warm water such as thermal nuclear plant cooling water), and attaches to the olfactory epithelium where it goes to the brain by chemotaxis. There the pathogen provokes a severe inflammatory response and causes primary amoebic meningoencephalitis (PAM), a very rare, yet 97% fatal disease. PAM shows symptoms very similar to bacterial meningitis. N. fowleri is one of four known free living amoebae found to cause human disease.

N. fowleri possess secreted proteases, phospholipases, and pore-forming peptides which are likely virulence factors.

Two other species, Naegleria austerealiensis and Naegleria italica have been shown to produce disease in experimental animals. Naegleria have been observed to cause central nervous system (CNS) infections in animals such as mice, rats, squirrels, guinea pigs, sheep, as well as infections in the gills of fish.

The species Naegleria gruberi is extensively studied for its transformation from the amoeboid phase into the flagellated stage, which can be difficult to induce in other genera. The transformation from flagellate to amoeboid stage can be induced by changes in ionic concentration, such as placing the organism in distilled water making it a great model organism for doing so.

=== List of species (or lower taxonomic units) ===
48 species of Naegleria have been described. These include:

- Naegleria americana
- Naegleria andersoni
- Naegleria angularis
- Naegleria antarctica
- Naegleria arctica
- Naegleria australiensis
- Naegleria byersi
- Naegleria canariensis
- Naegleria carteri
- Naegleria chilensis
- Naegleria clarki
- Naegleria dobsoni
- Naegleria dunnebackei
- Naegleria endoi
- Naegleria fowleri
- Naegleria fultoni
- Naegleria galeacystis
- Naegleria gallica
- Naegleria gruberi
- Naegleria indonesiensis
- Naegleria italica
- Naegleria jadini
- Naegleria jamiesoni
- Naegleria johanseni
- Naegleria laresi
- Naegleria lovaniensis
- Naegleria lustrarea
- Naegleria martinezi
- Naegleria mexicana
- Naegleria minor
- Naegleria morganensis
- Naegleria neoantarctica
- Naegleria neochilensis
- Naegleria neodobsoni
- Naegleria neopolaris
- Naegleria niuginensis
- Naegleria pagei
- Naegleria paradobsoni
- Naegleria peruana
- Naegleria philippinensis
- Naegleria polaris
- Naegleria pringsheimi
- Naegleria pussardi
- Naegleria robinsoni
- Naegleria schusteri
- Naegleria spitzbergeniensis
- Naegleria sturti
- Naegleria tenerifensis
- Naegleria tihangensis
