= Primary amoebic meningoencephalitis =

Rare and usually fatal brain infection by a protist

- Other names: Naegleriasis, amoebic encephalitis, naegleria infection, amoebic meningitis
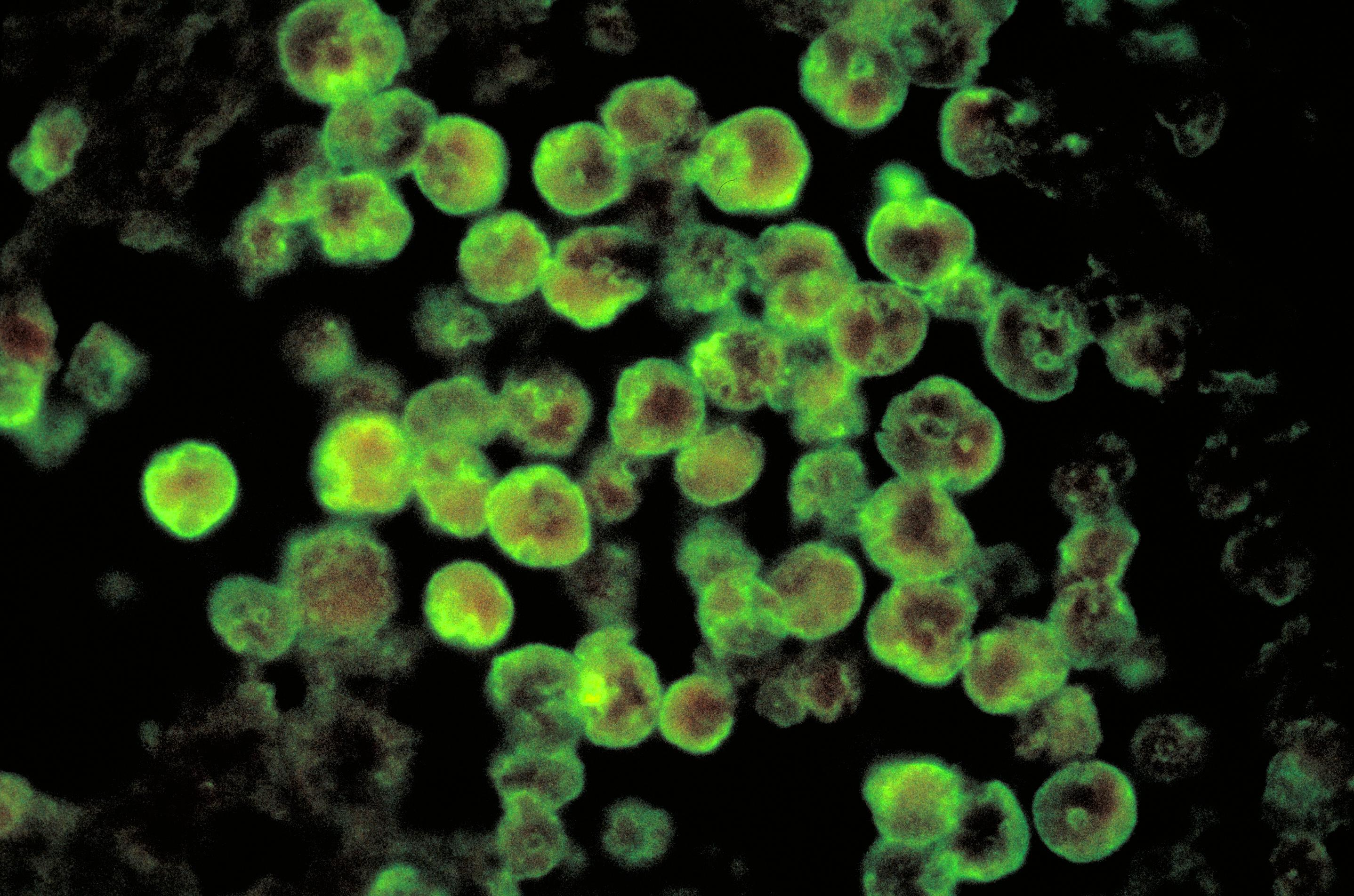
- Histopathology, direct fluorescent antibody stain.
- Pronunciation: /ˌnɛɡlərˈaɪəsɪs/
- Specialty: Infectious disease
- Symptoms: Fever, vomiting, stiff neck, seizures, poor coordination, confusion, coma
- Complications: Brain damage, death
- Usual onset: 1–12 days after exposure
- Duration: 1–18 days
- Causes: Deep nasal inhalation of Naegleria fowleri organisms from contaminated freshwater
- Risk factors: Roughly 75% of cases infect males; most cases are children or adolescents
- Differential diagnosis: Bacterial or fungal meningitis
- Prevention: Noseclips when swimming in fresh water, or avoiding freshwater environments, and proper chlorination of swimming pools
- Treatment: Miltefosine, fluconazole, amphotericin B, posaconazole, voriconazole, targeted temperature management
- Prognosis: 98.5% fatality rate; some, but not all, survivors have permanent neurological damage
- Frequency: Extremely rare (6 in 1,000,000 human deaths, US)
- Deaths: 381 globally from 1937–2018

Primary amoebic meningoencephalitis (PAM), also known as naegleriasis, is an almost invariably fatal infection of the brain by the free-living protozoan Naegleria fowleri. Symptoms include headache, fever, nausea, vomiting, a stiff neck, confusion, hallucinations and seizures. Symptoms progress rapidly over around five days with characteristics of both meningitis and encephalitis; becoming a type of meningoencephalitis. Death usually results within one to two weeks of symptom onset.

N. fowleri is typically found in warm bodies of fresh water, such as ponds, lakes, rivers and hot springs. It is found in an amoeboid, temporary flagellate stage or microbial cyst in soil, poorly maintained municipal water supplies, water heaters, near warm-water discharges of industrial plants and in poorly chlorinated or unchlorinated swimming pools. There is no evidence of it living in salt water. As the disease is rare, it is often not considered during diagnosis.

Although infection occurs very rarely, it almost inevitably results in death, with a mortality rate of 95-98%.

== Signs and symptoms ==
The onset of symptoms begins one to twelve days following exposure (with a median of five). Initial symptoms include changes in taste and smell, headache, fever, nausea, vomiting, back pain, and a stiff neck. Secondary symptoms are also meningitis-like including confusion, hallucinations, lack of attention, ataxia, cramp and seizures. After the start of symptoms, the disease progresses rapidly, with death usually occurring anywhere from one to eighteen days later (with a median of five), although it can take longer. In 2013, a man in Taiwan died 25 days after being infected by Naegleria fowleri.

It affects healthy children or young adults who have recently been exposed to bodies of fresh water. Scientists speculate that lower age groups are at a higher risk of contracting the disease because adolescents have a more underdeveloped and porous cribriform plate, through which the amoeba travels to reach the brain.

== Cause ==
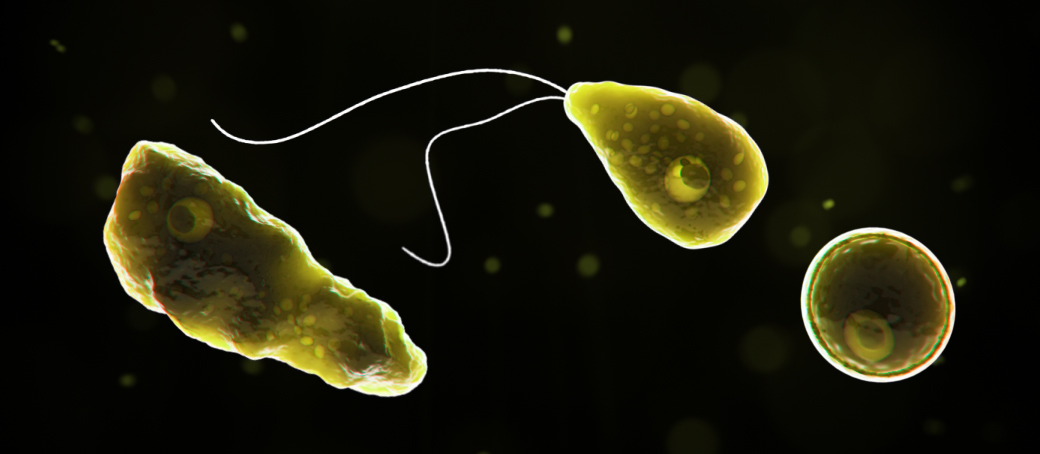
Naegleria fowleri

N. fowleri invades the central nervous system via the nose, specifically through the olfactory mucosa of the nasal tissues. This usually occurs as the result of the introduction of water that has been contaminated with N. fowleri into the nose during activities such as swimming, bathing or nasal irrigation.

The amoeba follows the olfactory nerve fibers through the cribriform plate of the ethmoid bone into the skull. There, it migrates to the olfactory bulbs and subsequently other regions of the brain, where it feeds on the nerve tissue. The organism then begins to consume cells of the brain, piecemeal through trogocytosis, by means of an amoebostome, a unique actin-rich sucking apparatus extended from its cell surface. It then becomes pathogenic, causing primary amoebic meningoencephalitis (PAM or PAME).

Primary amoebic meningoencephalitis presents symptoms similar to those of relatively common bacterial and viral meningitis. Upon abrupt disease onset, a plethora of symptoms arise. Endogenous cytokines, released in response to the pathogens, affect the thermoregulatory neurons of the hypothalamus, causing a rise in body temperature. Additionally, the cytokines may act on the vascular organ of the lamina terminalis, leading to upregulation of prostaglandin E2 contributing to hyperthermia. Further, the release of cytokines, exotoxins released by the pathogens, and an increase in intracranial pressure stimulate the nociceptors in the meninges resulting in pain sensations.

The release of cytotoxic molecules in the central nervous system leads to extensive tissue damage and necrosis, such as damage to the olfactory nerve through lysis of nerve cells and demyelination. Specifically, the olfactory nerve and bulbs become necrotic and hemorrhagic. Spinal flexion leads to nuchal rigidity, or stiff neck, due to the stretching of the inflamed meninges. The increase in intracranial pressure stimulates the area postrema to create nausea sensations, which may lead to brain herniation and damage to the reticular formation. Ultimately, the increase in cerebrospinal fluid from inflammation of the meninges increases intracranial pressure to an extent that leads to the destruction of the central nervous system. Although the exact pathophysiology behind the seizures caused by PAM is unknown, it is speculated that the seizures arise from altered meningeal permeability caused by increased intracranial pressure.

== Pathogenesis ==
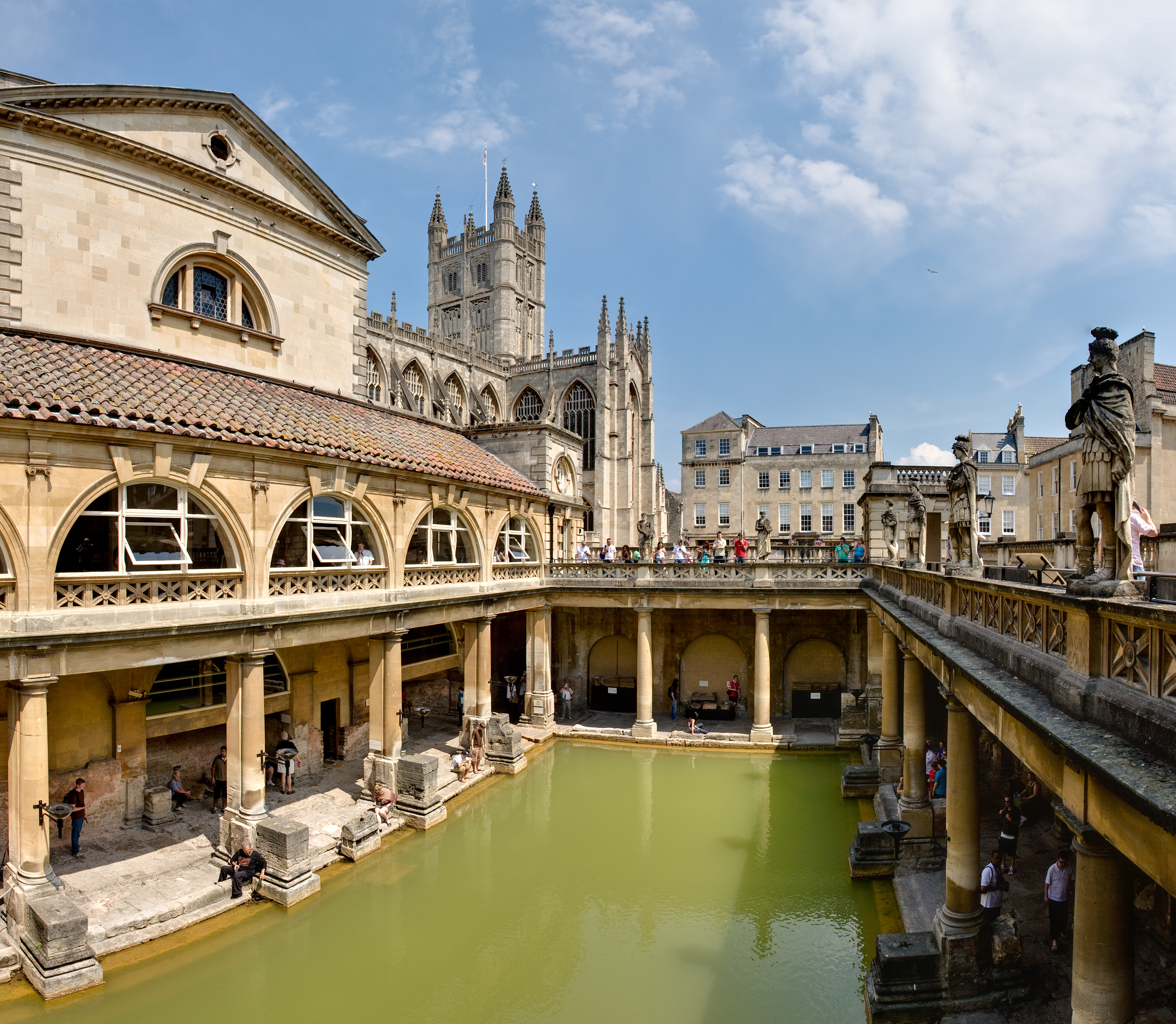
Roman Baths in Bath, Somerset, closed for bathing since 1978 due to presence of N. fowleri

Naegleria fowleri propagates in warm, stagnant bodies of fresh water (typically during the summer months), and enters the central nervous system after insufflation of infected water by attaching itself to the olfactory nerve. It then migrates through the cribriform plate and into the olfactory bulbs of the forebrain, where it rapidly multiplies by feeding on nerve tissue.

== Diagnosis ==
N. fowleri can be grown in several kinds of liquid axenic media or on non-nutrient agar plates coated with bacteria. Escherichia coli can be used to overlay the non-nutrient agar plate, and a drop of cerebrospinal fluid sediment is added to it. Plates are then incubated at 37 °C and checked daily for clearing of the agar in thin tracks, which indicates the trophozoites have fed on the bacteria.

Detection in water is performed by centrifuging a water sample with E. coli added, then applying the pellet to a non-nutrient agar plate. After several days, the plate is microscopically inspected and Naegleria cysts are identified by their morphology. Final confirmation of the species' identity can be performed by various molecular or biochemical methods.

Confirmation of Naegleria presence can be done by a so-called flagellation test, where the organism is exposed to a hypotonic environment (distilled water). Naegleria, in contrast to other amoebae, differentiates within two hours into the flagellate state. Pathogenicity can be further confirmed by exposure to high temperature (42 °C): Naegleria fowleri can grow at this temperature, but the nonpathogenic Naegleria gruberi can not.

== Prevention ==
Michael Beach, a recreational waterborne illness specialist for the Centers for Disease Control and Prevention, stated in remarks to the Associated Press that wearing of nose clips to prevent insufflation of contaminated water would be effective protection against contracting PAM, noting that "You'd have to have water going way up in your nose to begin with".

Advice stated in the press release from Taiwan's Centers for Disease Control recommended that people prevent fresh water from entering the nostrils and avoid putting their heads down into fresh water or stirring mud in the water with their feet. When starting to suffer from fever, headache, nausea, or vomiting after any exposure to fresh water, even in the belief that no fresh water has traveled through the nostrils, people with such conditions should be carried to hospital quickly and make sure doctors are well-informed about the history of exposure to fresh water.

== Treatment ==
Based on laboratory evidence and case reports, heroic doses of amphotericin B have been the traditional mainstay of PAM treatment since the first reported survivor in the United States in 1982.

Treatment has often also used combination therapy with multiple other antimicrobials in addition to amphotericin, such as fluconazole, miconazole, rifampicin, and azithromycin. They have shown limited success only when administered early in the course of an infection.

While the use of rifampicin has been common, including in all four North American cases of survival, its continued use has been questioned. It has variable activity only in vitro, and it has strong effects on the therapeutic levels of other antimicrobials used by inducing cytochrome p450 pathways. Fluconazole is commonly used as it has been shown to have synergistic effects against Naegleria when used with amphotericin in vitro.

In 2013–2016, three successfully treated cases in the United States utilized the medication miltefosine. In one of the cases, a 12-year-old girl was given miltefosine and targeted temperature management to manage cerebral edema, which is secondary to the infection. She survived with no neurological damage. Her survival has been attributed to the targeted temperature management, coupled with early diagnosis and medication. In 2016, a 16-year-old boy also survived PAM. He was treated with the same protocols as the 12-year-old girl in 2013. He recovered with a near-complete neurological recovery; the patient has mentioned difficulties with learning post-recovery, however. As of 2015 the U.S. CDC offered miltefosine to doctors for the treatment of diseases caused by free-living amoebas, including Naegleria, despite a lack of any data on how well the drug reaches the central nervous system. In 2022, another 13-year-old boy survived the infection, although the CDC did not confirm it.

In 2018, a 10-year-old girl in the Spanish city of Toledo became the first person to contract the disease in Spain, and was successfully treated using intravenous and intrathecal amphotericin B.

A 2023 study on mice has shown that treatment that included a derivative of the drug acoziborole known as AN3057 significantly prolonged survival and showed a 28% recovery rate without relapse.

== Prognosis ==
Since its first description in the 1960s, only nine people worldwide have been reported to have survived PAM out of 450 cases diagnosed, implying a fatality rate of about 98.5%. The survivors include four in the United States, one in Mexico, one in Spain, and one in India. One of the US survivors had likely permanent brain damage, but two documented surviving cases in the United States made a full recovery with no neurological damage; they were both treated with the same protocols.

An updated report from the Centers for Disease Control and Prevention shows a total of 167 reported cases of PAM between 1962-2024 in the United States: as with their last report there are still only four known survivors of PAM in the United States. An updated study of cases of PAM caused by N. fowleri, published in 2021, identified a total of 381 cases worldwide as of 2018, with only seven cases of recovery being confirmed.

== Epidemiology ==
The disease is rare and highly lethal: a 2025 study identified 488 cases of PAM reported globally since 1962. Drug treatment research at Aga Khan University in Pakistan has shown that in vitro drug susceptibility tests with some FDA-approved drugs used for non-infectious diseases (digoxin and procyclidine were shown to be most effective of the drugs studied) have proved to kill Naegleria fowleri with an amoebicidal rate greater than 95%. The same source has also proposed a device for drug delivery via the transcranial route to the brain.

PAM diagnosis will likely become more common, as climate change causes surface water temperatures to rise, and water pH, conductivity, and availability to change. Climate change was posited as the reason for cases in Minnesota in 2010 and 2012. The number of reported cases is also expected to increase due to better-informed diagnoses being made both in ongoing cases and in autopsy findings.

In the US, a total of 180 cases were diagnosed between 1937 and 2025, ranging from 0 to 8 cases per year. Texas and Florida have the highest incidence of PAM cases, followed by Virginia and California. The highest incidence of PAM occurs during the warmer months (especially during July and August), when people are more likely to be recreating in lakes and ponds. PAM occurs more commonly in males than females, and more commonly in younger than older people. The highest number of cases in the US is seen among boys aged 10 to 14 years.

== History ==
In 1899, Franz Schardinger first discovered and documented an amoeba he called Amoeba gruberi that could transform into a flagellate. The genus Naegleria was established by Alexis Alexeieff in 1912, who grouped the flagellate amoeba. He coined the term Naegleria after Kurt Nägler, who researched amoebae. It was not until 1965 that doctors Malcolm Fowler and Rodney F. Carter in Adelaide, Australia reported the first four human cases of amoebic meningoencephalitis. These cases involved four Australian children, one in 1961 and the rest in 1965, all of whom had succumbed to the illness. Their work on amoebo-flagellates has provided an example of how a protozoan can effectively live both freely in the environment, and in a human host.

In 1966, Butt termed the infection resulting from N. fowleri primary amoebic meningoencephalitis (PAM) to distinguish this central nervous system (CNS) invasion from other secondary invasions made by other amoebae such as Entamoeba histolytica. A retrospective study determined the first documented case of PAM possibly occurred in Britain in 1909. In 1966, four cases were reported in the US. By 1968, the causative organism, previously thought to be a species of Hartmannella, was identified as a novel species of Naegleria. This same year, the occurrence of sixteen cases over three years (1962–1965) was reported in Ústí nad Labem, Czechoslovakia. In 1970, Carter named the species of amoeba N. fowleri, after Malcolm Fowler.

== Society and culture ==
Naegleria fowleri is also known as the "brain-eating amoeba". This common name has also been applied to Balamuthia mandrillaris, causing some confusion between the two; Balamuthia mandrillaris is unrelated to Naegleria fowleri, and causes a different disease called granulomatous amoebic encephalitis. Unlike naegleriasis, which is usually seen in people with normal immune function, granulomatous amoebic encephalitis is usually seen in people with poor immune function, such as those with HIV/AIDS or leukemia.

Naegleriasis was the topic in Season 2 of the medical mystery drama House, M.D. in the two-part episode titled "Euphoria". It is also the topic of the episode "39 Differences" of season 6 of The Good Doctor after a patient is diagnosed with N. Fowleri infection.

== Research ==
The U.S. National Institutes of Health budgeted $800,000 for research on the disease in 2016. Phenothiazines have been tested in vitro and in animal models of PAM. Improving case detection through increased awareness, reporting, and information about cases might enable earlier detection of infections, provide insight into the human or environmental determinants of infection, and allow improved assessment of treatment effectiveness.

== See also ==
- Balamuthia mandrillaris – unrelated pathogenic organism that shares the same common name as N. fowleri
- Granulomatous amoebic encephalitis
