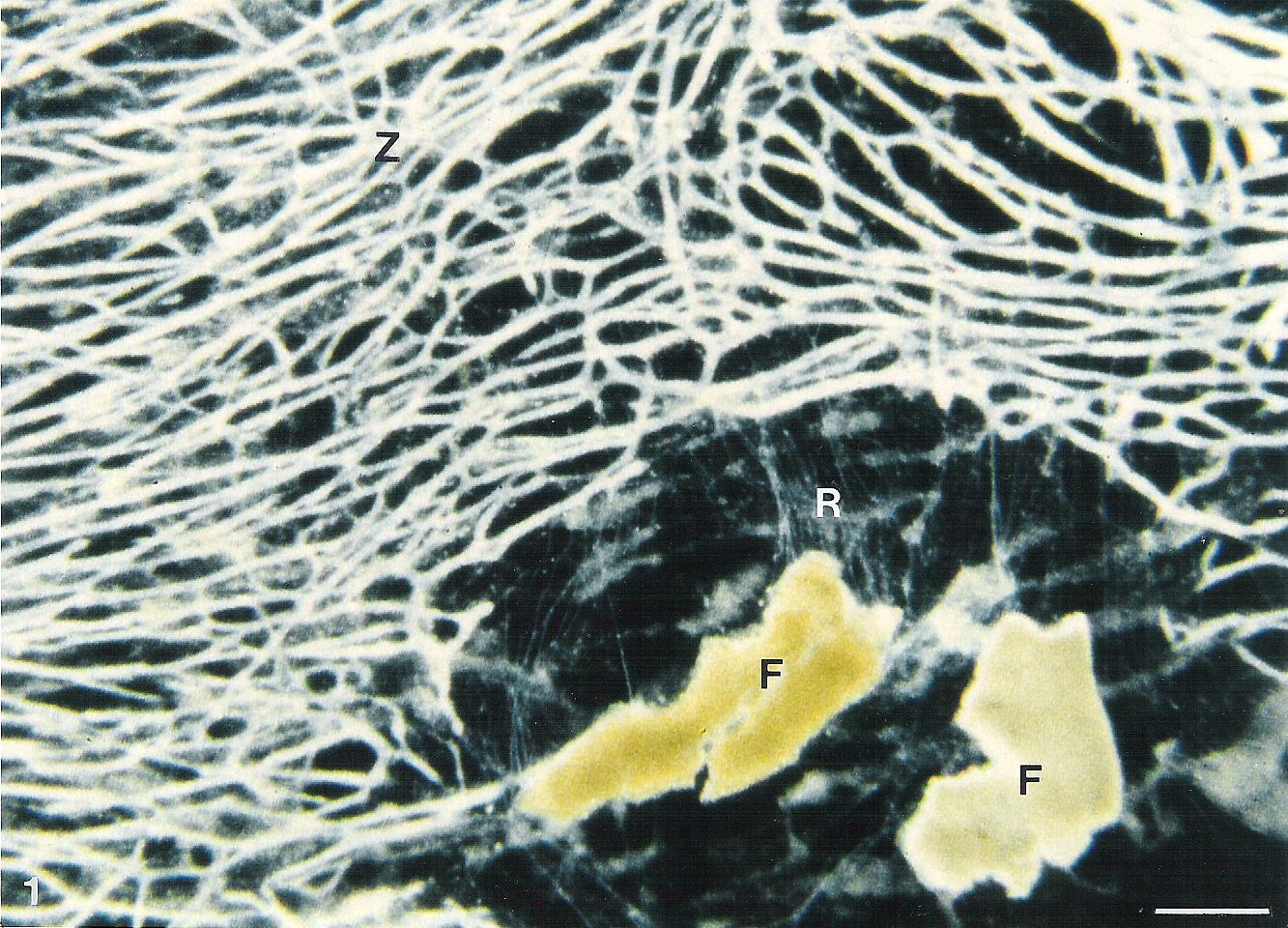
- darkfield microscopic photo of the cell body (Z) of Reticulomyxa filosa. In the lower right of the picture you see some food particles (F) (wheat germ) surrounded by the fine stands of the Reticulopodial Network (R)

Scientific classification
- Domain: Eukaryota
- Clade: Sar
- Clade: Rhizaria
- Phylum: Retaria
- Subphylum: Foraminifera
- Class: Monothalamea
- Order: Allogromiida
- Family: Reticulomyxidae
- Genus: Reticulomyxa
- Species: R. filosa

Binomial name
- Reticulomyxa filosa Nauss 1949

= Reticulomyxa =

Genus of single-celled organisms

Reticulomyxa is a monospecific genus of freshwater foraminiferans. The type species is the unicellular Reticulomyxa filosa. It is found in freshwater environments as well as moist environments, like decomposing matter and damp soils. The heterotrophic naked foraminiferan can feed on microbes as well has larger organisms and is able to be sustained in culture by supplemented nutrients such as wheat germ and oats. The large, multinucleate foraminiferan is characteristic for its lack of test and named for the network of connecting pseudopodia surrounding its central body mass. The organism has unique bidirectional cytoplasmic streaming throughout the anastomosing pseudopodia that is some of the fastest reported organelle transport observed. Reticulomyxa was first described in 1949 and is commonly used as a model organism for the unique transport of organelles throughout the cytoplasm of pseudopodia by cytoskeletal mechanisms. Only asexual reproduction of this genus has been observed in culture, but the genome possesses genes related to meiosis suggesting it is capable of sexually reproductive life stages.

== History and etymology ==
In 1937 Reticulomyxa was isolated from a slime mold culture and observed in culture for twelve years before being officially described. It was continued to be found in damp environments in that area. This organism was initially cultured in semi aquatic conditions on damp blotting paper and in dishes of freshwater. From this original isolation, samples were cultivated and observed before R. filosa was first described by Ruth Nauss in 1949 and named for its network of filose pseudopodia. Since this initial description, Reticulomyxa has been isolated from various freshwater environments as well as terrestrially.

The lack of test seen in Reticulomyxa is important for the history of foraminferans. Fossils of tests have been recorded from marine environments but any potentially unknown naked foraminferans would not be identified this way. The existence of Reticulomyxa is important because it suggests that there are potentially unstudied naked foraminiferans in marine ecosystems that have not been identified due to their lack of fossils. The organism has been used as a model system in studies of cytoskeletal transport due to the unique fast bidirectional cytoplasmic streaming in network of pseudopodia and on the cell body surface.

== Ecology ==
Reticulomyxa is found in aquatic and semi aquatic terrestrial environments. R. filosa has been isolated from lakes, moist soil, decomposing organic matter, and artificial bodies of water. Under different conditions the plasmodium will take on various morphologies. When transferred to an aqueous environment, the plasmodia will dissociate into smaller cell bodies that reform pseudopodia.

Reticulomyxa is a heterotroph that can feed on prey of a range of sizes. Previous studies have observed the ingestion of bacteria and other protists, as well as large aquatic zooplankton. The vegetative plasmodium will stay in one location while eating until surrounding food sources have been depleted. Once devoid of food, the cell will excrete waste from the protoplasm and move to a new location. Feeding occurs through the pseudopodia of the cell, filose pseudopodia engulf and phagocytize prey. Prey is encapsulated in food vacuoles and are then transported back to the central body via the cytoskeletal machinery.

== Description ==
=== Morphology ===
Reticulomyxa has a plasmodial morphology, including a central body surrounded by filose pseudopodia, which have a diameter of approximately 50 μm. This organism lacks a test that is a defining characteristic of foraminiferans. This test is suspected to have been lost throughout its evolution due to the adaptation to freshwater environments. When in the vegetative stage, the central body of Reticulomyxa is round and has many pseudopodia extending outwards forming an array or network-like plasmodia which facilitate locomotion and feeding. These pseudopodia consistently change shape and length due to changing environmental and nutrient conditions. In aquatic conditions the pseudopodia branch out in all directions whereas when in moist condition the pseudopodia contract into the central body. The cytoplasm of this organism is thick and streams bidirectionally through the veins. Cytoplasmic streaming allowing for the movement of organelles and vacuoles throughout the network can reach speeds of 25 μm/s. Organelle movement is facilitated through the cytoskeleton, which consists of actin and microtubules. Organelles are attached to the microtubules of the cytoskeleton and movement is due to the sliding of microtubules along each other in both directions. This giant freshwater foraminferan contains many haploid nuclei, approximately 5 μm in diameter.

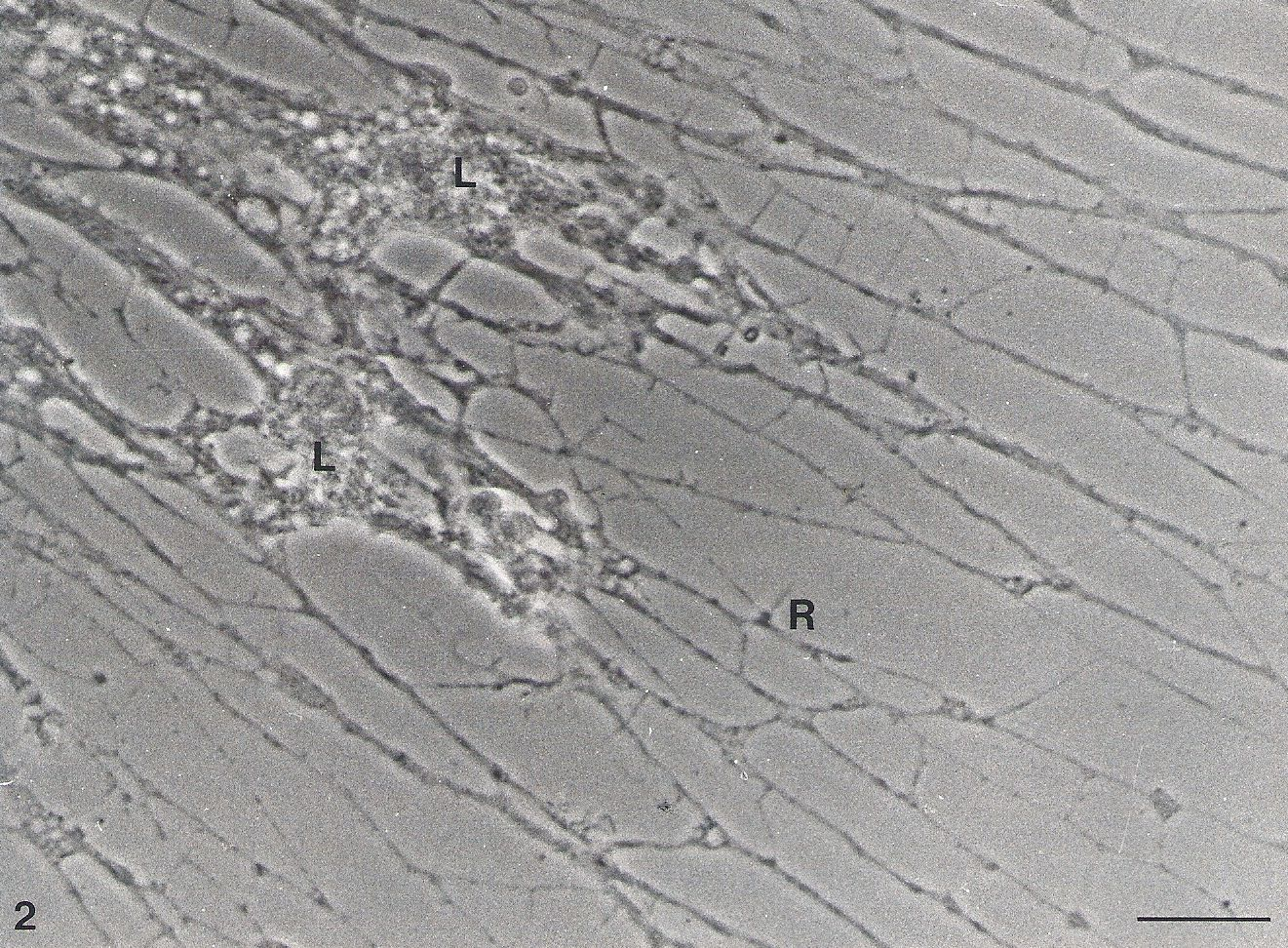
Small section of the Reticulopodial Network of Reticulomyxa filosa: Fine reticulopods alter with small Lamellipodial sections. (Phase contrast micrograph; bar = 50 micrometers)

Cysts produced by Reticulomyxa can be covered or uncovered. Covered cysts are enclosed by two layers, with the outer mucus layer being much thicker. Uncovered cysts do not have the thick outer layer as seen in covered cysts and have irregular sizes.

=== Life cycle ===
Plasmodia of this genera have only been seen to undergo mitosis in culture conditions. Asexual reproduction through multiple fission, where the nuclei will undergo many rounds of mitotic division before the cytoplasm separates. In Reticulomyxa, mitosis is closed, the nuclear membrane remains intact during spindle formation and chromosome separation. Under culture conditions, division was initiated following the movement to a new location. Division starts at the anterior end of the cell and produces three daughter cells.

The Reticulomyxa plasmodium may encyst for dispersal or in response to adverse environmental conditions. Cysts with and without coverings have been produced by Reticulomyxa. Cysts covered with a thick envelope can withstand harsher conditions and disperse by wind as well as water. Covered cells were only observed to form during summer months in culture conditions. Uncovered cysts are smooth and have irregular sizes. These uncovered resting cysts were produced in culture conditions in response unfavorable environmental conditions like low temperatures or when nutrient availability was low.

=== Genetics ===
The genome of Reticulomyxa is repetitive and approximately 320 Mbp in size. The genome contains genes for flagellar components, despite no flagellated form observed. Also, genes coding for proteins associated with meiosis are present in the Reticulomyxa genome but are not actively transcribed. The presence of flagella and meiosis related genes suggests that there is a possibility of sexual reproduction and gamete production in this genus.
