= Amoeboflagellate =

Cellular body type

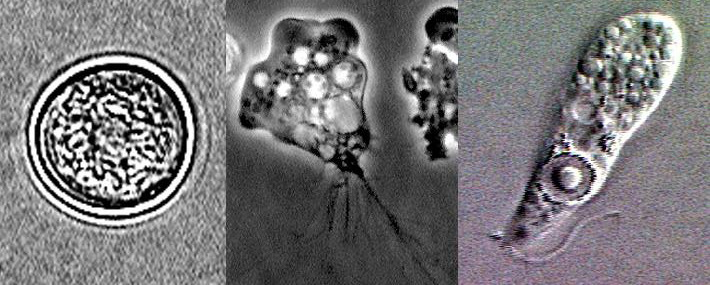
The heterolobosean human pathogen Naegleria fowleri can behave as an amoeba (center) or as a flagellate (right).

An amoeboflagellate is any eukaryotic organism capable of behaving as an amoeba and as a flagellate at some point during their life cycle. Amoeboflagellates present pseudopodia and at least one flagellum, often in separate life stages (as in Naegleria fowleri, a human pathogen) or in the same stage simultaneously (as in Cercomonas).

== Occurrence ==
The amoeboflagellate cell type has been acquired numerous independent times across the evolution of protists (i.e. primarily unicellular eukaryotes that are not plants, fungi or animals). Some examples of protist groups with amoeboflagellate body types are:

- Cercozoa contains various examples of amoeboflagellates with filose pseudopods, thread-like cell projections also known as filopodia. The cercomonads, glissomonads and paracercomonads behave as amoeboflagellates with two flagella throughout the majority of their life cycle, and are essential predators of the soil microbiome. Among the more basal Cercozoa is Reticulamoeba, an amoeboflagellate with reticulose pseudopods (reticulopodia), filopodia that join into a net-like structure.
- Amoebozoa contains several groups of amoeboflagellates with one or two flagella and lobose pseudopods, which are rounder and more blunt-ended than filopodia. Among them are the myxogastrids, a group of slime molds that behave as amoeboflagellates in various stages of their life cycle. Many species of Archamoebae, a more basal group, are anaerobic amoeboflagellates. Other examples are the dictyostelians, another group of slime molds, and the closely related varioseans, such as Phalansterium.
- Breviatea, a small class related to animals, fungi and amoebozoans, is composed of anaerobic amoeboflagellates with two flagella.
- Percolozoa contains amoeboflagellates with lobose pseudopods, but are differentiated by their flat mitochondrial cristae, not tubular as in Amoebozoa. A popular example is the genus Naegleria, whose members can change shape between an amoeba and a flagellate.

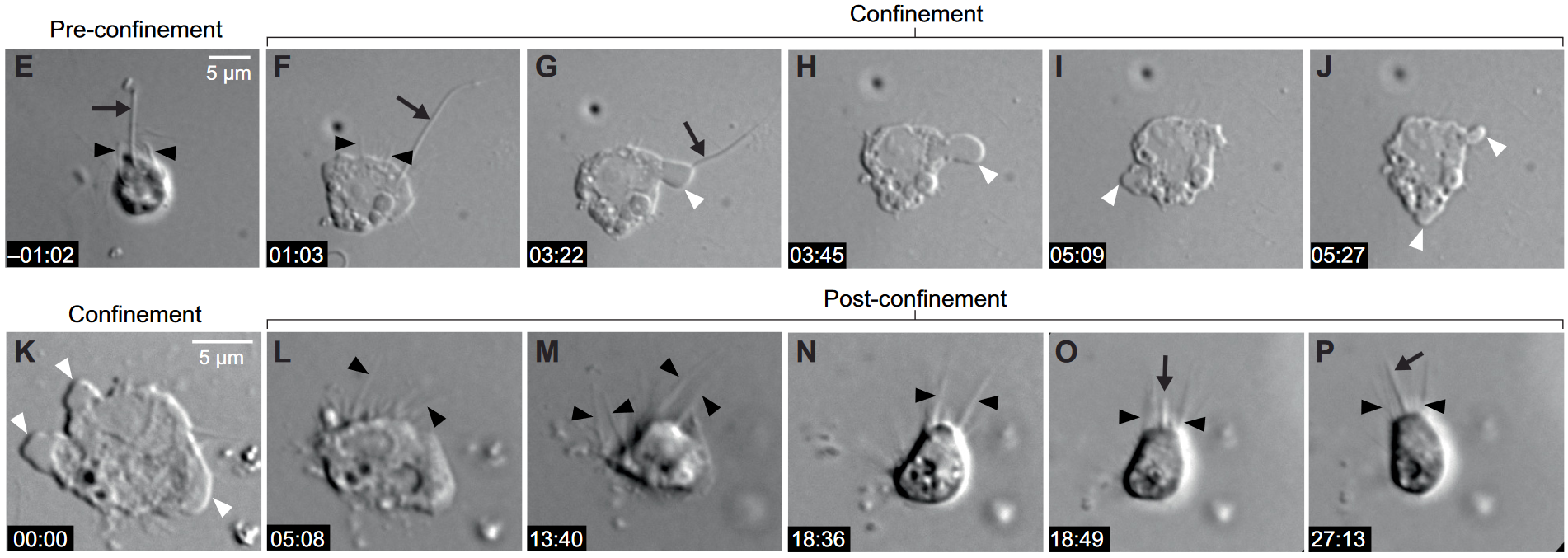
The choanoflagellate Salpingoeca rosetta can switch between a swimming (flagellate) stage and a crawling (amoeboid) stage when subjected to a confined space.

The amoeboflagellate phenotype is present in numerous protists that have a crucial phylogenetic position near the origin of animals and fungi, within the vast clade known as Opisthokonta. It has been described in choanoflagellates such as Salpingoeca, filastereans such as Pigoraptor, and even some early-branching fungi such as Sanchytrium, but it is absent in animals. The two species of Pluriformea have a wide range of cell types, from cellular aggregations to amoeboflagellates.
