= Attention deficit =

Attention deficit may refer to:

- Attention deficit hyperactivity disorder
  - Attention deficit hyperactivity disorder predominantly inattentive
- Other disorders of attention, for instance in traumatic brain injury and neurodegenerative disease
- Attention Deficit (album), a 2009 hip hop album by Wale
- "Attention Deficit", a season 1 episode of The Loud House
