= Amoeba =

Cellular body type

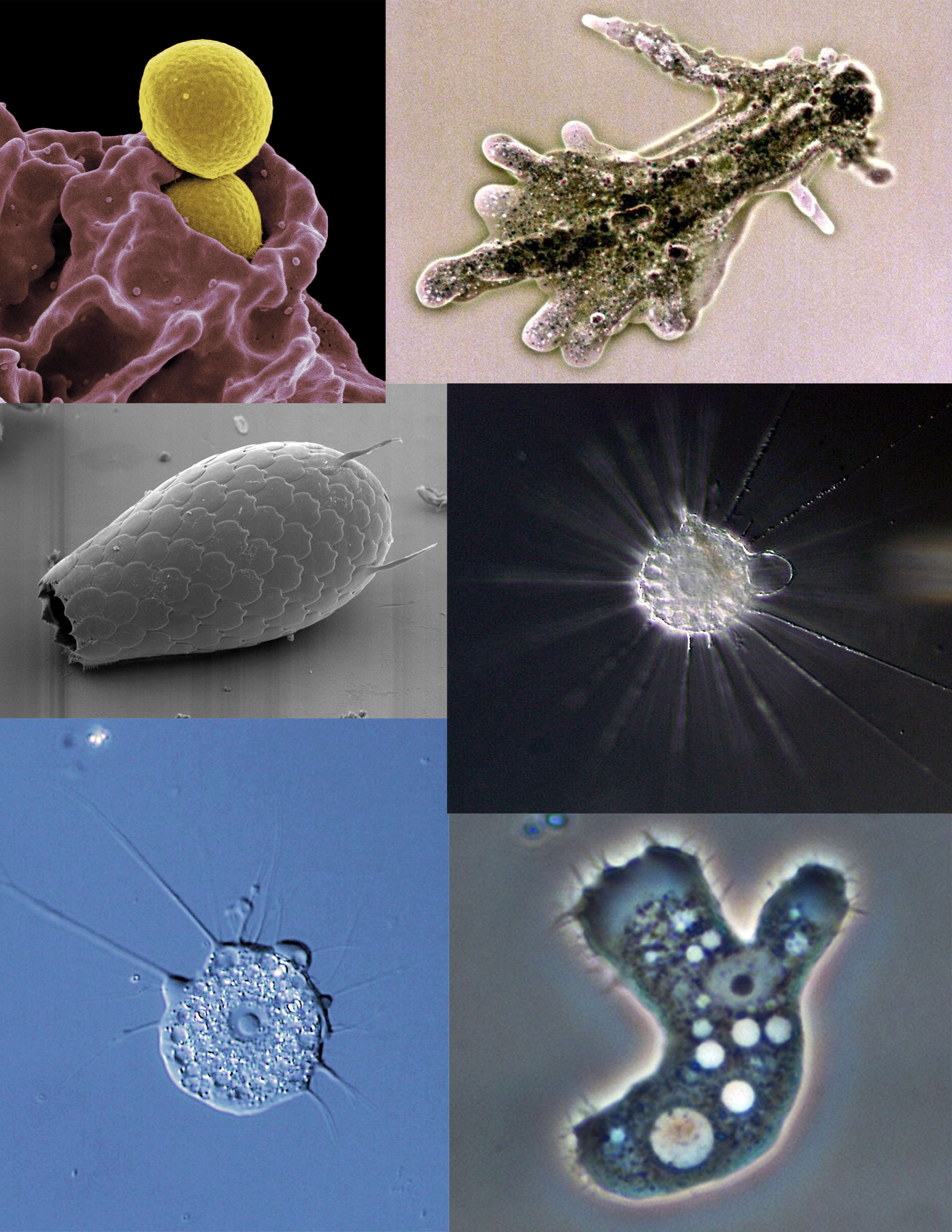
Clockwise from top right: Amoeba proteus, Actinophrys sol, Acanthamoeba sp., Nuclearia thermophila., Euglypha acanthophora, neutrophil ingesting bacteria.

An amoeba or ameba (/ə.ˈmiː.bə/; pl.: amoebas or amebas (less commonly, amoebae or amebae /ə.ˈmiː.bi/)), often called an amoeboid, is a type of cell or unicellular organism with the ability to alter its shape, primarily by extending and retracting pseudopods. Amoebae do not form a single taxonomic group; instead, they are found in every major lineage of eukaryotic organisms. Amoeboid cells occur not only among the protozoa, but also in fungi, algae, and animals.

Microbiologists often use the terms "amoeboid" and "amoeba" interchangeably for any organism that exhibits amoeboid movement.

In older classification systems, most amoebae were placed in the class or subphylum Sarcodina, a grouping of single-celled organisms that possess pseudopods or move by protoplasmic flow. However, molecular phylogenetic studies have shown that Sarcodina is not a monophyletic group whose members share common descent. Consequently, amoeboid organisms are no longer classified together in one group.

The best known amoeboid protists are Chaos carolinense and Amoeba proteus, both of which have been widely cultivated and studied in classrooms and laboratories. Other well known species include the so-called "brain-eating amoeba" Naegleria fowleri, the intestinal parasite Entamoeba histolytica, which causes amoebic dysentery, and the multicellular "social amoeba" or slime mould Dictyostelium discoideum.

== Biology ==
=== Pseudopods and movement ===
The forms of pseudopodia, from left: polypodial and lobose; monopodial and lobose; filose; conical; reticulose; tapering actinopods; non-tapering actinopods

Amoebae do not have cell walls, which allows for free movement. Amoebae move and feed by using pseudopods, which are bulges of cytoplasm formed by the coordinated action of actin microfilaments pushing out the plasma membrane that surrounds the cell. The appearance and internal structure of pseudopods are used to distinguish groups of amoebae from one another. Amoebozoan species, such as those in the genus Amoeba, typically have bulbous (lobose) pseudopods, rounded at the ends and roughly tubular in cross-section. Cercozoan amoeboids, such as Euglypha and Gromia, have slender, thread-like (filose) pseudopods. Foraminifera emit fine, branching pseudopods that merge with one another to form net-like (reticulose) structures. Some groups, such as the Radiolaria and Heliozoa, have stiff, needle-like, radiating axopodia (actinopoda) supported from within by bundles of microtubules.

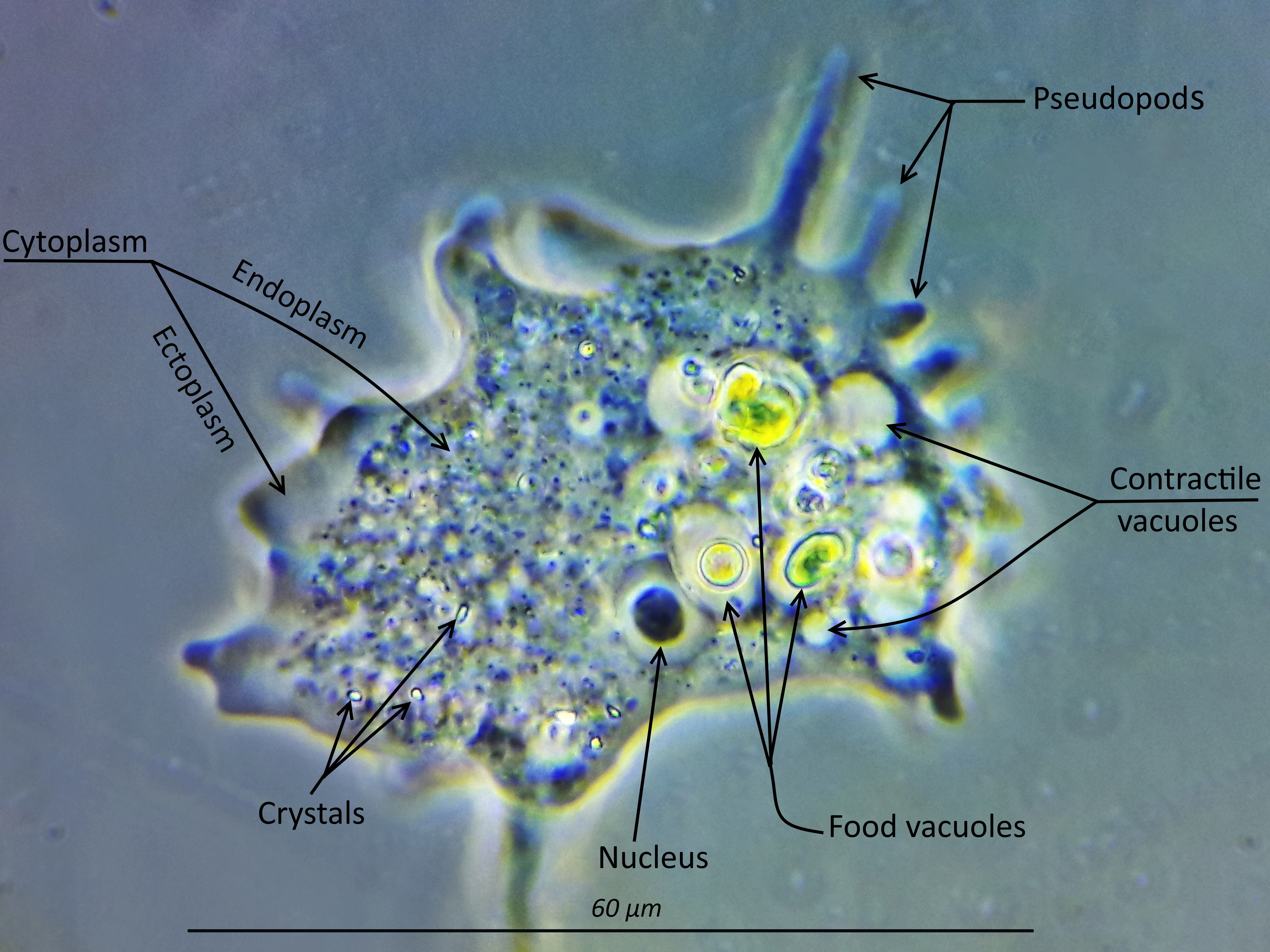
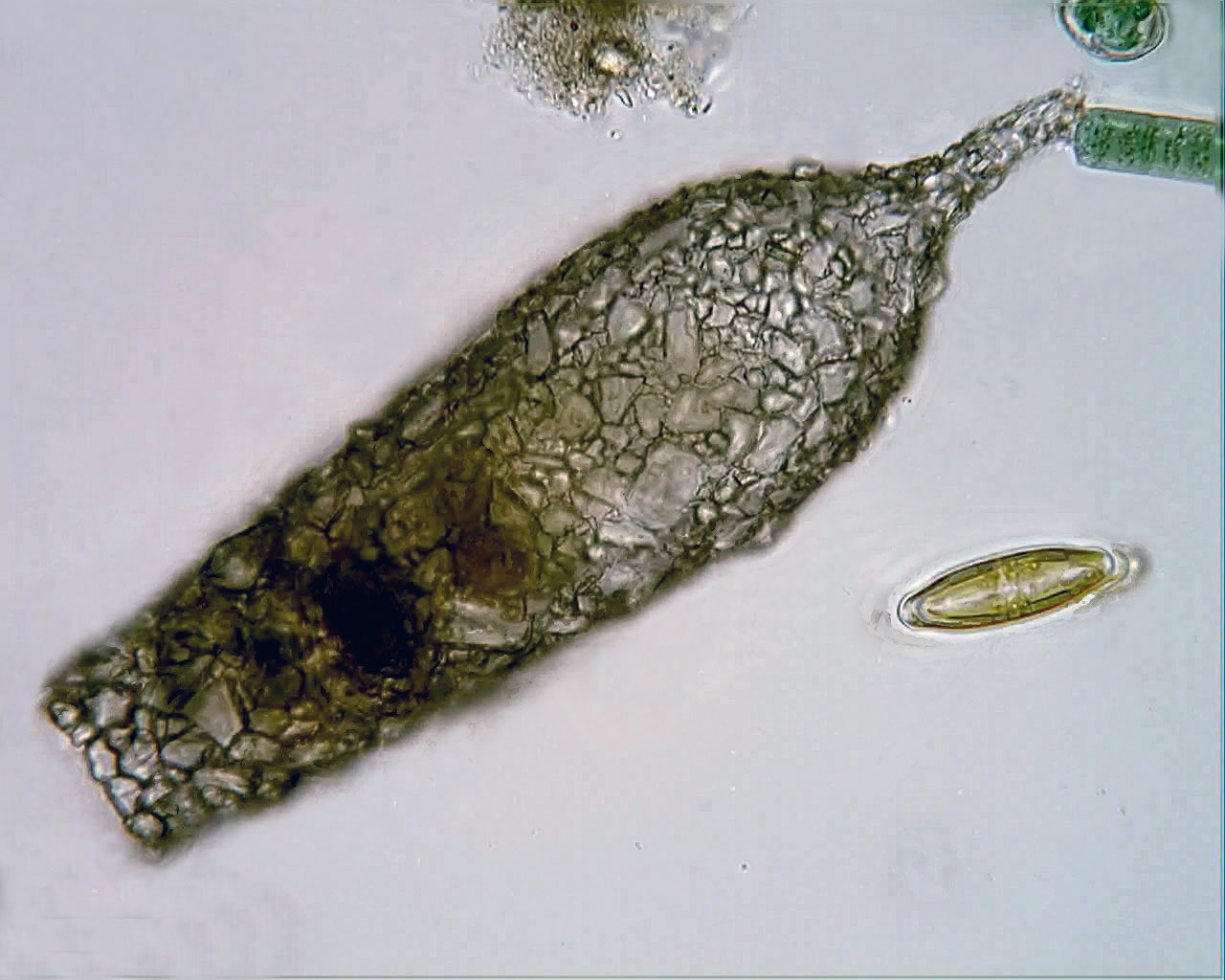
"Naked" amoeba of the genus Mayorella (left) and shell of the testate amoeba Cylindrifflugia acuminata (right)

Free-living amoebae may be "testate" (enclosed within a hard shell), or "naked" (also known as gymnamoebae, lacking any hard covering). The shells of testate amoebae may be composed of various substances, including calcium, silica, chitin, or agglutinations of found materials like small grains of sand and the frustules of diatoms.

To regulate osmotic pressure, most freshwater amoebae have a contractile vacuole which expels excess water from the cell. This organelle is necessary due to freshwater having a lower concentration of solutes (such as salt) than the amoeba's own internal fluids (cytosol). Because the surrounding water is hypotonic with respect to the contents of the cell, water is transferred across the amoeba's cell membrane by osmosis. Without a contractile vacuole, the cell would fill with excess water and, eventually, burst. Marine amoebae do not usually possess a contractile vacuole because the concentration of solutes within the cell are in balance with the tonicity of the surrounding water.

=== Nutrition ===
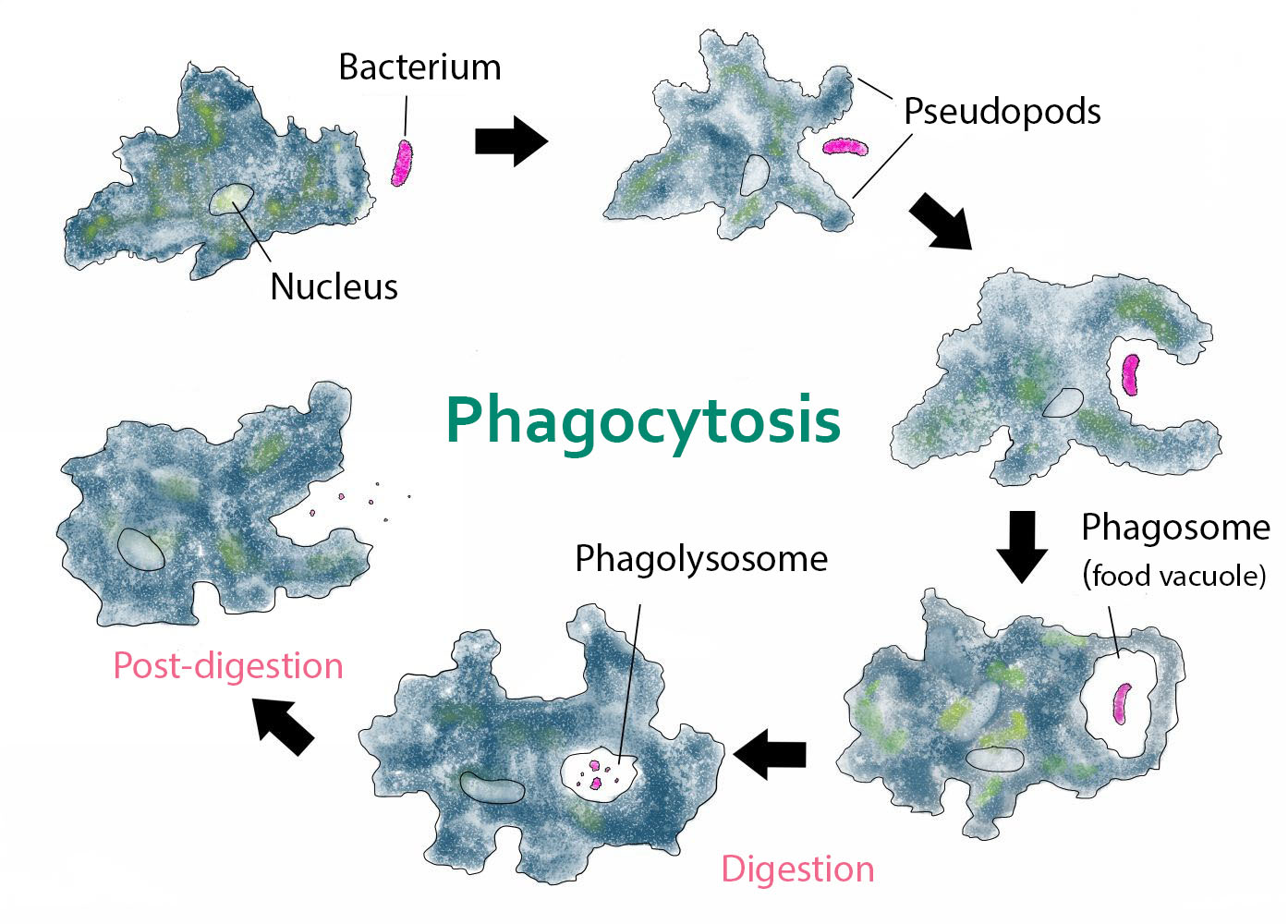
Amoeba phagocytosis of a bacterium

The food sources of amoebae vary. Some amoebae are predatory and live by consuming bacteria and other protists. Some are detritivores and eat dead organic material.

Amoebae typically ingest their food by phagocytosis, extending pseudopods to encircle and engulf live prey or particles of scavenged material. Amoeboid cells do not have a mouth or cytostome, and there is no fixed place on the cell at which phagocytosis normally occurs.

Some amoebae also feed by pinocytosis, imbibing dissolved nutrients through vesicles formed within the cell membrane.

=== Size range ===
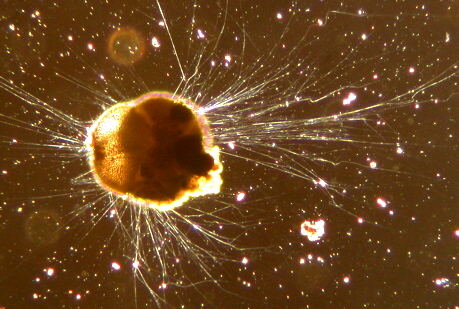
Foraminifera have reticulose (net-like) pseudopods, and many species are visible with the naked eye.

The size of amoeboid cells and species is extremely variable. The marine amoeboid Massisteria voersi is just 2.3 to 3 micrometres in diameter, within the size range of many bacteria. At the other extreme, the shells of deep-sea xenophyophores can attain 20 cm in diameter. Most of the free-living freshwater amoebae commonly found in pond water, ditches, and lakes are microscopic, but some species, such as the so-called "giant amoebae" Pelomyxa palustris and Chaos carolinense, can be large enough to see with the naked eye.

Species or cell type	Size in micrometers
Massisteria voersi	2.3–3
Naegleria fowleri	8–15
Neutrophil (white blood cell)	12–15
Acanthamoeba	12–40
Entamoeba histolytica	15–60
Arcella vulgaris	30–152
Amoeba proteus	220–760
Chaos carolinense	700–2000
Pelomyxa palustris	up to 5000
Syringammina fragilissima	up to 200000

=== Sexual reproduction ===
Recent evidence indicates that several Amoebozoa lineages undergo meiosis.

Orthologs of genes employed in meiosis of sexual eukaryotes have recently been identified in the Acanthamoeba genome. These genes included Spo11, Mre11, Rad50, Rad51, Rad52, Mnd1, Dmc1, Msh and Mlh. This finding suggests that the ''Acanthamoeba'' are capable of some form of meiosis and may be able to undergo sexual reproduction.

The meiosis-specific recombinase, Dmc1, is required for efficient meiotic homologous recombination, and Dmc1 is expressed in Entamoeba histolytica. The purified Dmc1 from E. histolytica forms presynaptic filaments and catalyses ATP-dependent homologous DNA pairing and DNA strand exchange over at least several thousand base pairs. The DNA pairing and strand exchange reactions are enhanced by the eukaryotic meiosis-specific recombination accessory factor (heterodimer) Hop2-Mnd1. These processes are central to meiotic recombination, suggesting that E. histolytica undergoes meiosis.

Studies of Entamoeba invadens found that, during the conversion from the tetraploid uninucleate trophozoite to the tetranucleate cyst, homologous recombination is enhanced. Expression of genes with functions related to the major steps of meiotic recombination also increase during encystations. These findings in E. invadens, combined with evidence from studies of E. histolytica indicate the presence of meiosis in the Entamoeba.

Dictyostelium discoideum in the supergroup Amoebozoa can undergo mating and sexual reproduction including meiosis when food is scarce.

Since the Amoebozoa diverged early from the eukaryotic family tree, these results suggest that meiosis was present early in eukaryotic evolution. Furthermore, these findings are consistent with the proposal of Lahr et al. that the majority of amoeboid lineages are anciently sexual.

== Ecology ==
=== Pathogenic amoebae ===
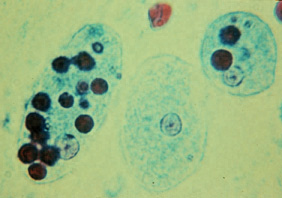
Trophozoites of the pathogenic Entamoeba histolytica with ingested red blood cells

Some amoebae can infect other organisms pathogenically, causing disease:

- Entamoeba histolytica is the cause of amoebiasis, or amoebic dysentery.
- Naegleria fowleri (the "brain-eating amoeba") is a fresh-water-native species that can be fatal to humans if introduced through the nose.
- Acanthamoeba can cause amoebic keratitis and encephalitis in humans.
- Balamuthia mandrillaris is the cause of (often fatal) granulomatous amoebic meningoencephalitis.

Amoebae have been found to harvest and grow the bacteria implicated in plague. Amoebae can likewise play host to microscopic organisms that are pathogenic to people and help in spreading such microbes. Bacterial pathogens (for example, Legionella) can oppose absorption of food when devoured by amoebae. The currently generally utilized and best-explored amoebae that host other organisms are Acanthamoeba castellanii and Dictyostelium discoideum. Microorganisms that can overcome the defenses of one-celled organisms can shelter and multiply inside them, where they are shielded from unfriendly outside conditions by their hosts.

== History of knowledge and classification ==
=== Conceptual origins ===
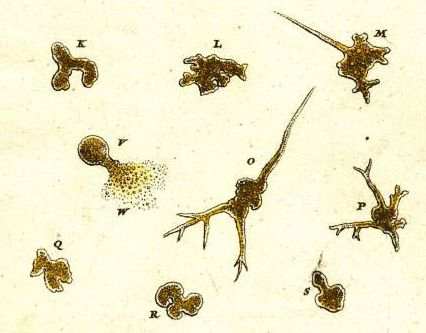
The first illustration of an amoeboid, from Rösel von Rosenhof's Insecten-Belustigung (1755)

The earliest record of an amoeboid organism was produced in 1755 by August Johann Rösel von Rosenhof, who named his discovery "Der Kleine Proteus" ("the Little Proteus"). Rösel's illustrations show an unidentifiable freshwater amoeba, similar in appearance to the common species now known as Amoeba proteus. The term "Proteus animalcule" remained in use throughout the 18th and 19th centuries, as an informal name for any large, free-living amoeboid.

In 1822, the genus Amiba (from the Greek ἀμοιβή amoibe, meaning "change") was erected by the French naturalist Bory de Saint-Vincent. Bory's contemporary, C. G. Ehrenberg, adopted the genus in his own classification of microscopic creatures, but changed the spelling to Amoeba.

In 1841, Félix Dujardin coined the term "sarcode" (from Greek σάρξ sarx, "flesh", and εἶδος eidos, "form") for the "thick, glutinous, homogeneous substance" which fills protozoan cell bodies. Although the term originally referred to the protoplasm of any protozoan, it soon came to be used in a restricted sense to designate the gelatinous contents of amoeboid cells. Thirty years later, the Austrian zoologist Ludwig Karl Schmarda used "sarcode" as the conceptual basis for his division Sarcodea, a phylum-level group made up of "unstable, changeable" organisms with bodies largely composed of "sarcode". Later workers, including the influential taxonomist Otto Bütschli, amended this group to create the class Sarcodina, a taxon that remained in wide use throughout most of the 20th century.

=== Traditional classification ===
Examples of different kinds of amoebae

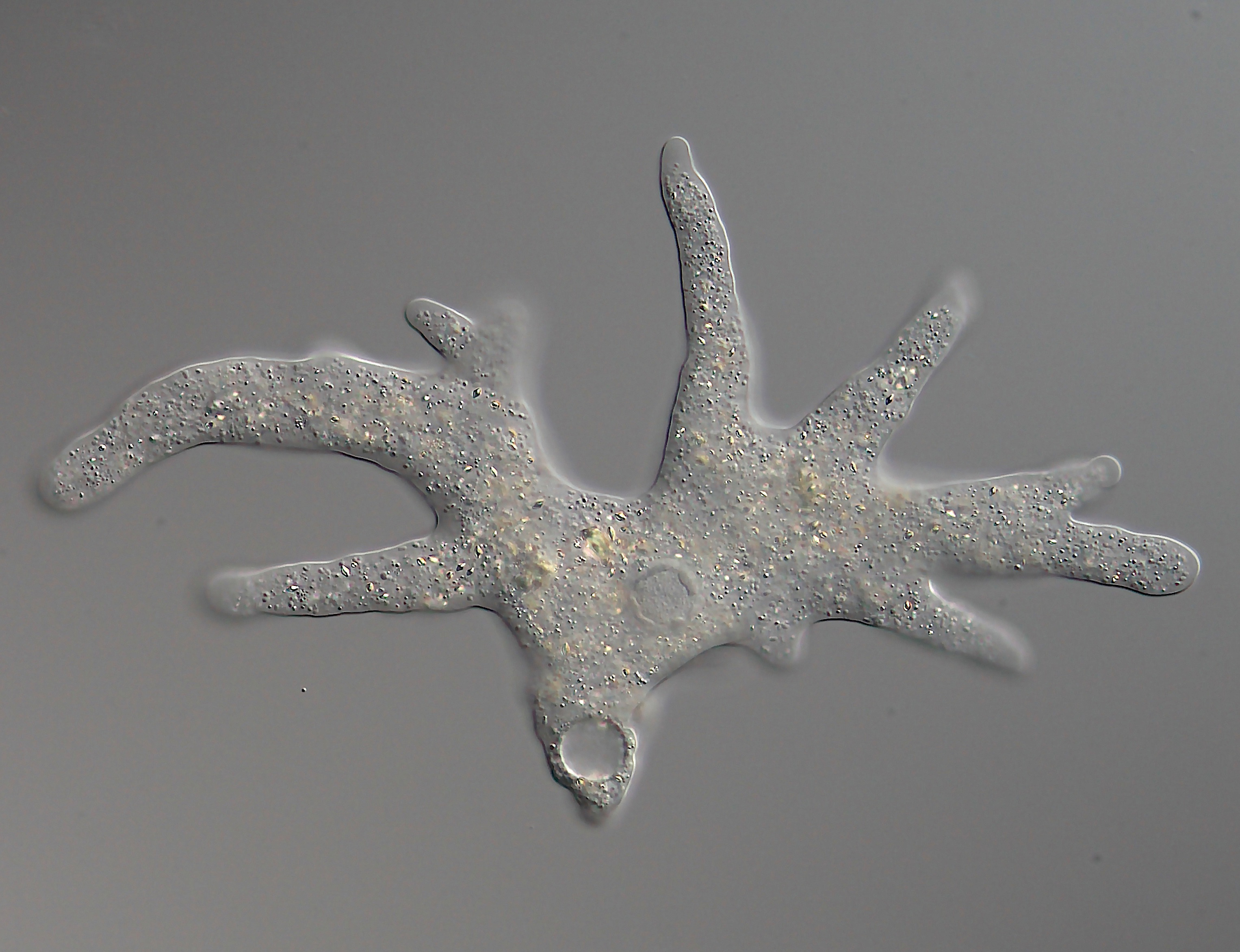
Amoeba proteus, a gymnamoeba

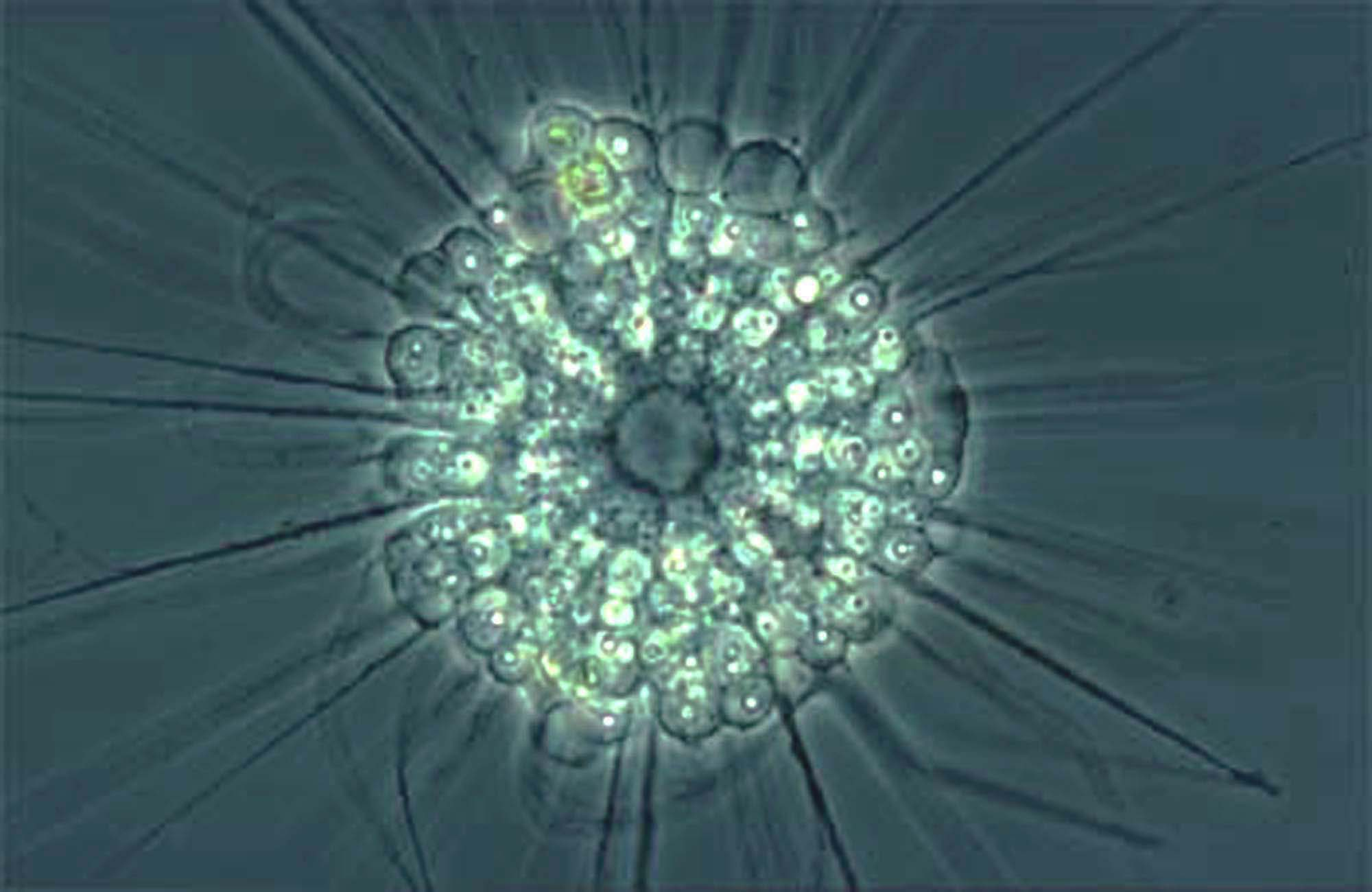
Actinophrys sol, a heliozoan

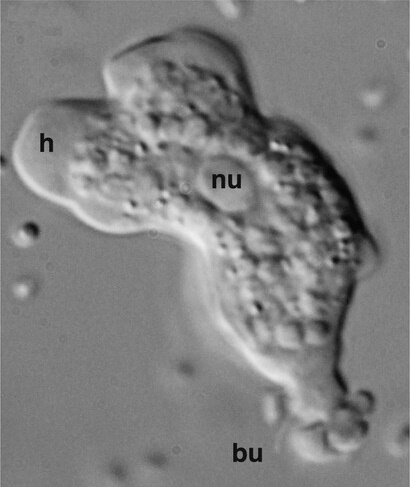
Naegleria lustrarea, a heterolobosean

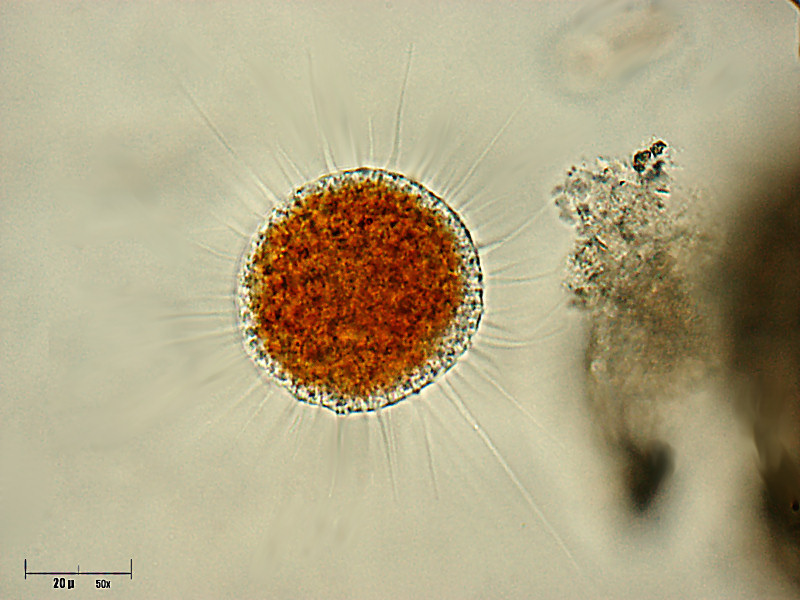
Vampyrella lateritia, a proteomyxid

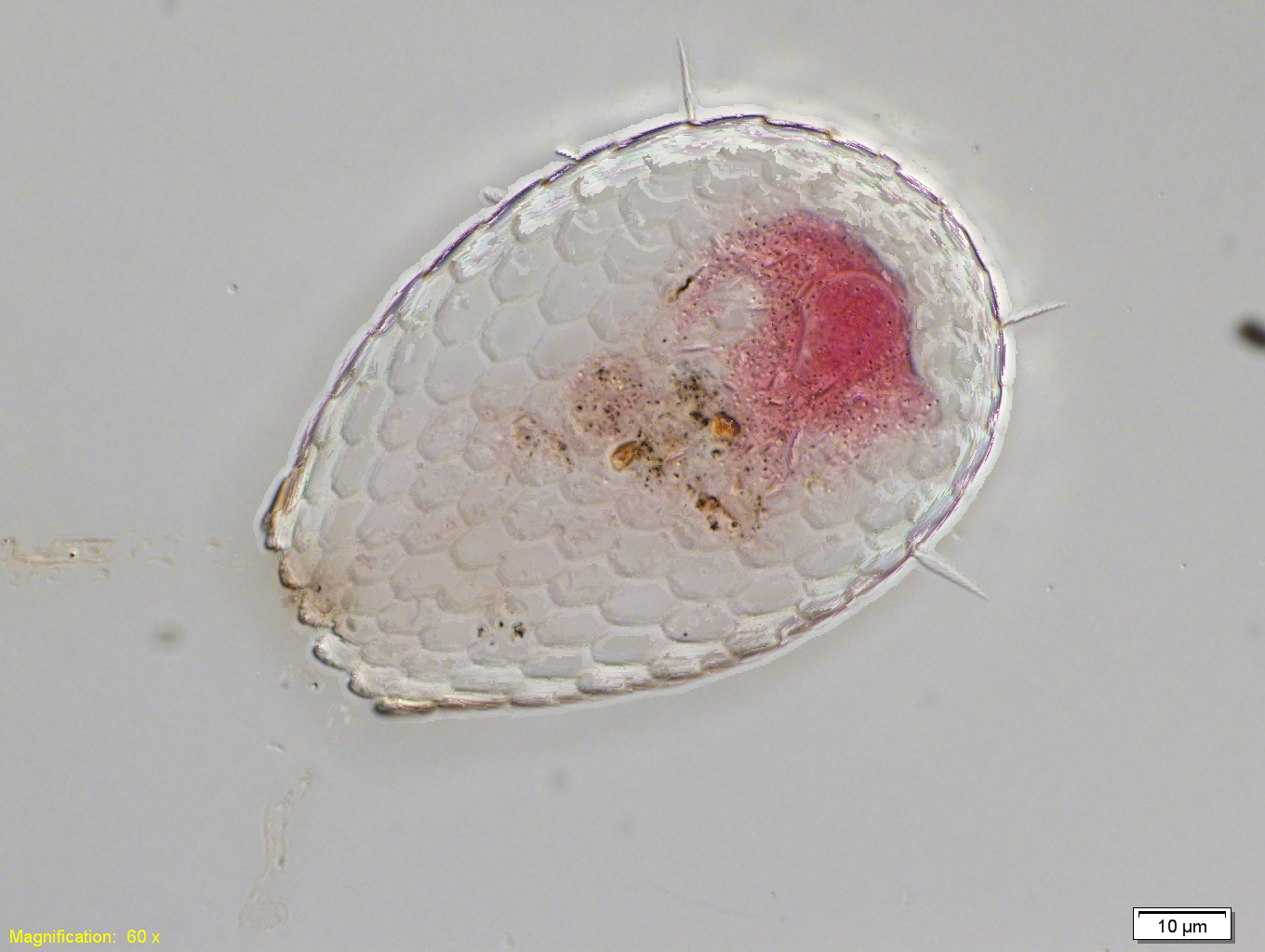
Euglypha ciliata, a filose testate amoeba

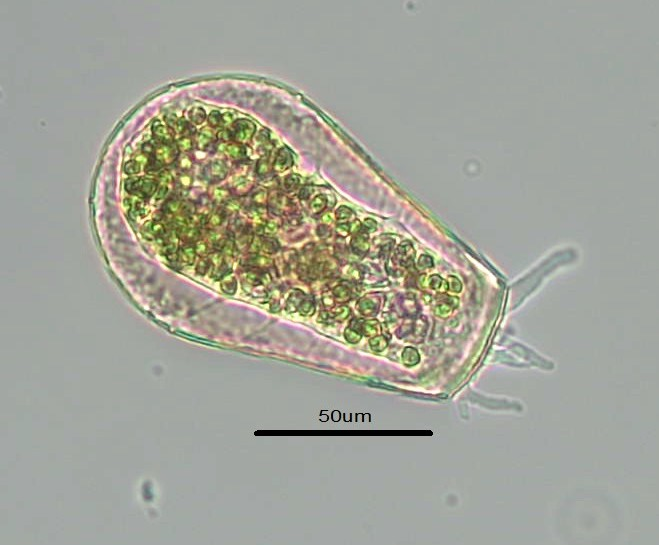
Hyalosphenia papilio, a lobose testate amoeba

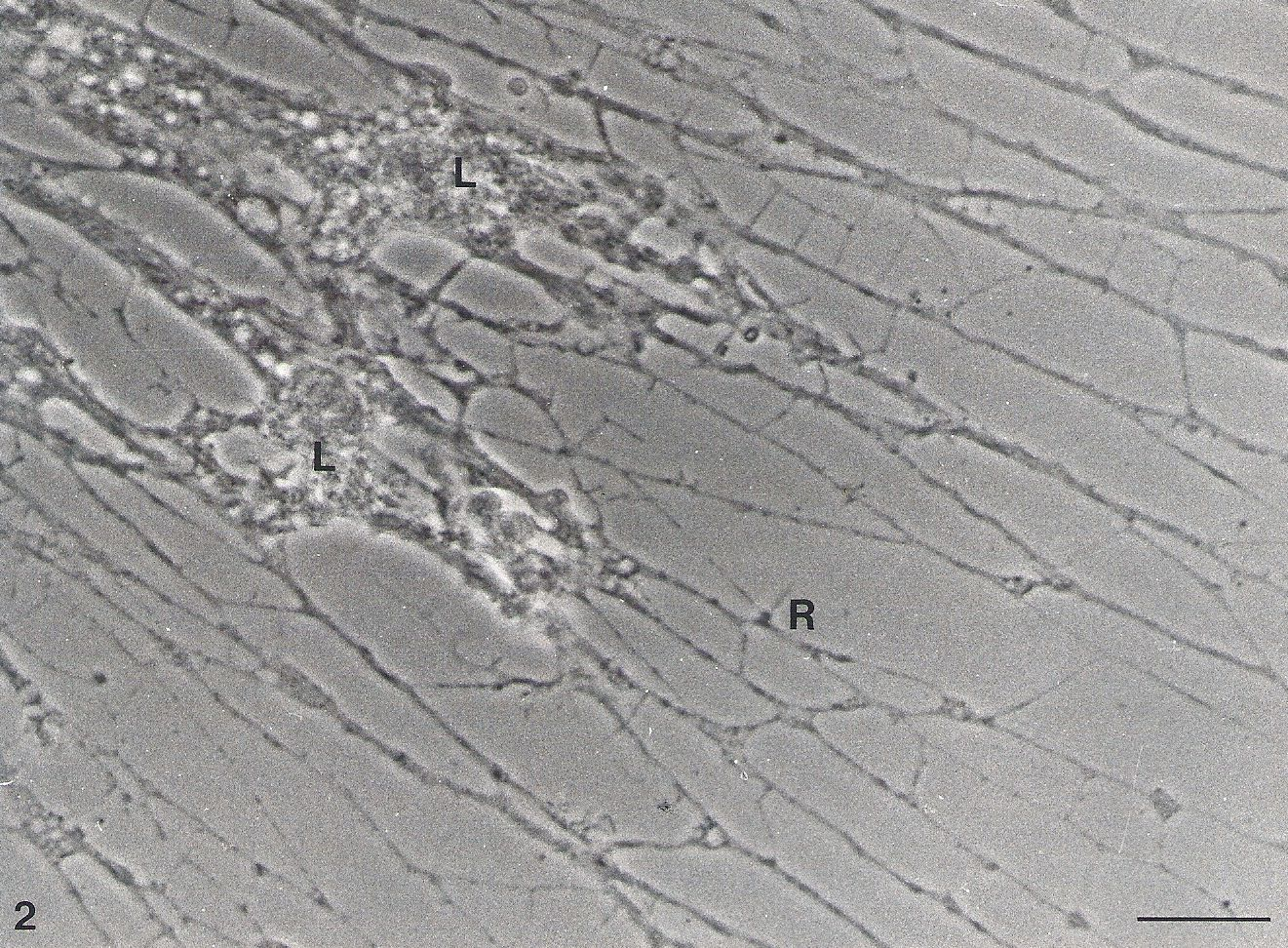
Reticulomyxa filosa, a reticulose amoeba

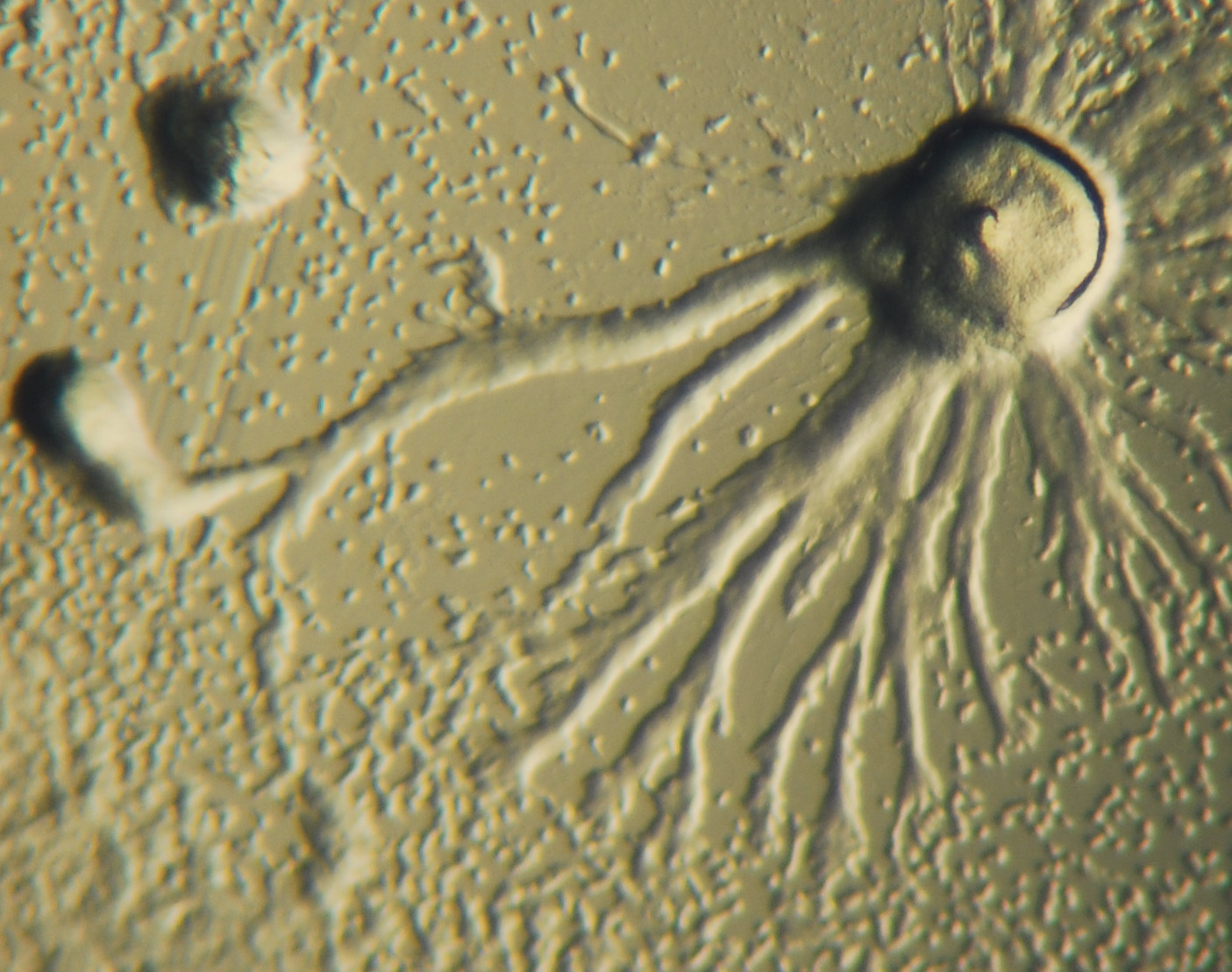
Dictyostelium discoideum, an eumycetozoan

For convenience, all amoebae were grouped as Sarcodina and generally divided into morphological categories, on the basis of the form and structure of their pseudopods. Amoebae with pseudopods supported by regular arrays of microtubules (such as the freshwater Heliozoa and marine Radiolaria) were classified as Actinopoda, whereas those with unsupported pseudopods were classified as Rhizopoda. The Rhizopods were further subdivided into lobose, filose, plasmodial and reticulose, according to the morphology of their pseudopods. During the 1980s, taxonomists reached the following classification, based exclusively on morphological comparisons:

- **Sarcodina** Schmarda 1871: all amoebae.

- **Rhizopoda** von Siebold 1845: amorphous amoebae that lack axopodia and move through pseudopodia.

- Heterolobosea Page & Blanton 1985: amoebae with eruptive pseudopodia, similar to the lobose ones but with a distinct movement, and usually with flagellate life stages. It was traditionally divided into those which aggregate to form fruiting bodies (Acrasida) and those that do not (Schizopyrenida).

- Lobosea Carpenter 1861: amoebae with lobose pseudopodia. This paraphyletic group is now represented by a big portion of the current phylum Amoebozoa, in particular the classes Tubulinea, Discosea and Cutosea.

- Gymnamoebia Haeckel 1862: lobose naked amoebae. This polyphyletic group included the classic amorphous amoebae with big, blunt pseudopodia, such as Euamoebida, Leptomyxida, Acanthopodida, Echinamoebida, Entamoebida, etc.

- Testacealobosia de Saedeleer 1934: lobose testate amoebae. This polyphyletic group included three unrelated lineages of amoebozoans enclosed by tests or other complex coverings: Arcellinida, Himatismenida and Trichosida.

- Caryoblastea Margulis 1974: amoebae with sparse, non-motile flagella on the surface. This group only includes the order Pelobiontida, which now belongs to the amoebozoan group Archamoebae together with some naked amoebae.

- Eumycetozoea Zopf 1885: plasmodial amoebae with filiform subpseudopodia that produce fruiting bodies.

- Plasmodiophorea Cook 1928: endoparasitic plasmodial amoebae with minute pseudopodia. This group is now an order within Rhizaria, closely related to the endoparasites Phagomyxida.

- Filosea Leidy 1879: amoebae with filose pseudopodia.

- Aconchulinia de Saedeleer 1934: filose naked amoebae, sometimes covered in scales. This group included two unrelated taxa: the nucleariid amoebae, closely related to fungi; and most of the Vampyrellida, found in Rhizaria.

- Testaceafilosia de Saedeleer 1934: filose testate amoebae. This group included taxa now found throughout Rhizaria, such as Gromiida and Euglyphida.

- Granuloreticulosea de Saedeleer 1934: amoebae with delicate granular pseudopodia. This group included both the Foraminifera (now in Rhizaria) and some members of Vampyrellida.

- Xenophyophorea Schulze 1904: plasmodial amoebae enclosed in a branched-tube system composed of a transparent organic substance. This group is now fully integrated into the Foraminifera.

- **Actinopoda** Calkins 1909: spherical amoebae that float in the water column. This group included those organisms that have a heliozoan-type appearance, with radially positioned filopodia, reticulopodia or axopodia surrounding the cell body. These were the Radiolaria, Phaeodaria, Proteomyxidea (all three now in Rhizaria), Centroplasthelida (now in Haptista), and Actinophryida (now in Stramenopiles).

=== Transitional period ===
- Eukaryotes
  - Archezoa
  - - Percolozoa (Heterolobosea)
    - - other excavates
      - - **Eosarcodina**
        - - **Neosarcodina**
          - - **Actinopoda**
            - Alveolata → Plants, Chromista
            - Apusozoa → Choanozoa → Animals, Fungi

The 'amoeboflagellate' hypothesis by Thomas Cavalier-Smith, where higher eukaryotes evolved from amoeboid phyla.

In the final decades of the 20th century, a series of molecular phylogenetic analyses confirmed that Sarcodina was not a monophyletic group, and that amoebae evolved from flagellate ancestors. The protozoologist Thomas Cavalier-Smith proposed that the ancestor of most eukaryotes was an amoeboflagellate much like modern heteroloboseans, which in turn gave rise to a paraphyletic Sarcodina from which other groups (e.g., alveolates, animals, plants) evolved by a secondary loss of the amoeboid phase. In his scheme, the Sarcodina were divided into the more primitive Eosarcodina (with the phyla Reticulosa and Mycetozoa) and the more derived Neosarcodina (with the phyla Amoebozoa for lobose amoebae and Rhizopoda for filose amoebae).

Shortly after, phylogenetic analyses disproved this hypothesis, as non-amoeboid zooflagellates and amoeboflagellates were found to be completely intermingled with amoebae. With the addition of many flagellates to Rhizopoda and the removal of some amoebae, the name was rejected in favour of a new name Cercozoa. As such, both names Rhizopoda and Sarcodina were finally abandoned as formal taxa, but they remained useful as descriptive terms for amoebae. The phylum Amoebozoa was conserved, as it still primarily included amoeboid organisms, and now included the Mycetozoa.

=== Current classification ===
Today, amoebae are dispersed among many high-level taxonomic groups. The majority of traditional sarcodines are placed in two eukaryote supergroups: Amoebozoa and Rhizaria. The rest have been distributed among the excavates, opisthokonts, stramenopiles and minor clades.

- Amoebozoa Lühe 1913 em. Cavalier-Smith 1998: includes all naked and testate lobose amoebae (traditional Lobosea) as well as the pelobionts and eumycetozoans, and a few flagellates.
- Rhizaria Cavalier-Smith 2002: includes amoebae bearing reticulose or filose pseudopodia, the majority of which were traditionally classified as Filosea, Granuloreticulosea and Actinopoda, such as Euglyphida, Gromiida, Radiolaria, Proteomyxidea, Phaeodarea and Foraminifera (including Xenophyophorea). It also houses a large diversity of free-living flagellates, amoeboflagellates and parasites like the Plasmodiophorida.
- Heterolobosea Page & Blanton 1985: amoebae with lobose pseudopodia but eruptive flow of cytoplasm. Currently it includes the aggregative Acrasida, as well as several other amoeboflagellates. They are a class of excavates closely related to Euglenozoa, with whom they share their characteristic discoidal mitochondrial cristae.
- Stramenopiles Patterson 1989 em. Adl et al. 2005: although primarily composed by flagellates, it contains a few groups of amoebae. For example: the Actinophryida, an order with typical heliozoan morphology; the amoeboid Rhizochromulina, a genus of chrysophytes; or Synchroma, a genus of amoeboid algae with reticulate axopodia.
- Rotosphaerida Rainer 1968: also known as nucleariids, includes a few filose amoebae traditionally classified within the Filosea, positioned as the sister group of Fungi.
- Centroplasthelida Febvre-Chevalier & Febvre 1984: heliozoans with a centroplast from which axopodia arise. They are closely related to the haptophyte algae inside the supergroup Haptista.
- Rigifilida Cavalier-Smith 2012: a small order of filose amoebae previously interpreted as nucleariids. Together with the flagellate orders Mantamonadida and Diphylleida, it composes the CRuMs clade, positioned closest to Amorphea.
- Breviatea Cavalier-Smith 2004: includes enigmatic free-living amoeboflagellates related to opisthokonts.

The following cladogram shows the sparse positions of amoeboid groups (in bold), based on molecular phylogenetic analyses:

- Eukaryotes
  - Discoba
    - euglenids, etc.
    - **Heterolobosea**
  - Diaphoretickes
    - plants, etc.
    - - Haptista
        - **Centroplasthelida**
        - haptophytes
      - SAR
        - **Stramenopiles**
        - alveolates
        - **Rhizaria**
  - Podiata
    - CRuMs (incl. **Rigifilida**)
    - Amorphea
      - **Amoebozoa**
      - Obazoa
        - **Breviatea**
        - - apusomonads
          - Opisthokonta
            - Holozoa
              animals, etc.
            - Holomycota
              - Fungi
              - **Nucleariids**

== Amoeboid cells in other organisms ==
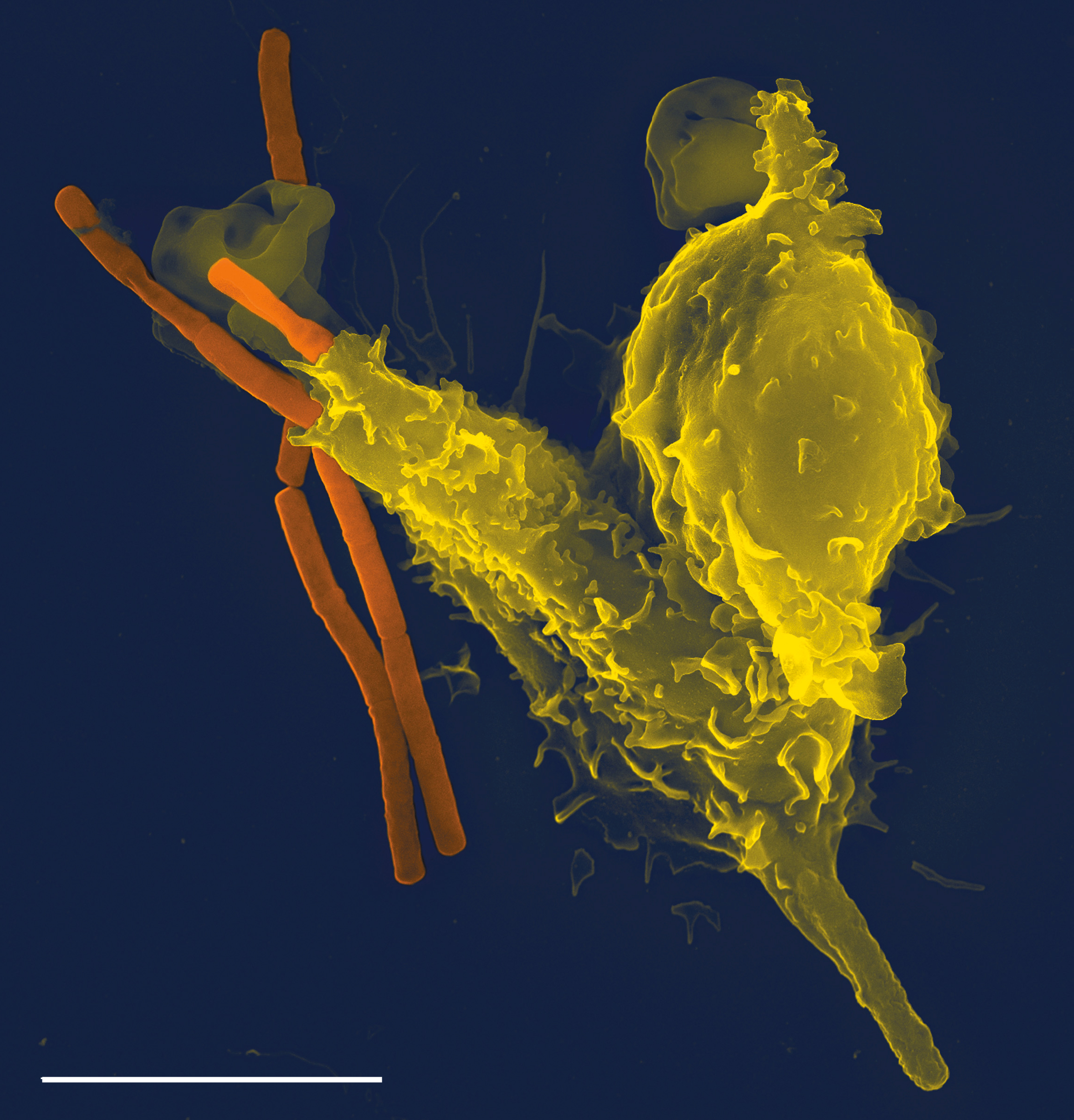
Neutrophil (white blood cell) engulfing anthrax bacteria

=== Amoeboid cell types in multicellular organisms ===
Some multicellular organisms have amoeboid cells only in certain phases of life, or use amoeboid movements for specialized functions. In the immune system of humans and other animals, amoeboid white blood cells pursue invading organisms, such as bacteria and pathogenic protists, and engulf them by phagocytosis. Sponges exhibit a totipotent cell type known as archaeocytes, capable of transforming into the feeding cells or choanocytes.

=== Amoeboid dispersal stages ===
Amoeboid stages also occur in the multicellular fungus-like protists, the so-called slime moulds. Both the plasmodial slime moulds, currently classified in the class Myxogastria, and the cellular slime moulds of the groups Acrasida and Dictyosteliida, live as amoebae during their feeding stage. The amoeboid cells of the former combine to form a giant multinucleate organism, while the cells of the latter live separately until food runs out, at which time the amoebae aggregate to form a multicellular migrating "slug" which functions as a single organism.

Other organisms may also present amoeboid cells during certain life-cycle stages, e.g., the gametes of some green algae (Zygnematophyceae) and pennate diatoms, the spores (or dispersal phases) of some Mesomycetozoea, and the sporoplasm stage of Myxozoa and of Ascetosporea.
