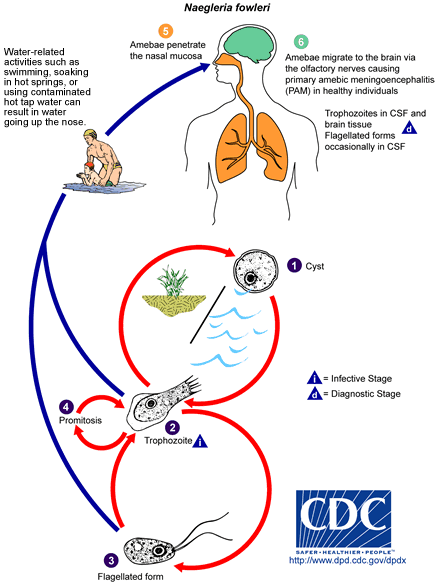
- Diagram depicting the stages of Naegleria fowleri's lifecycle and environment at that stage
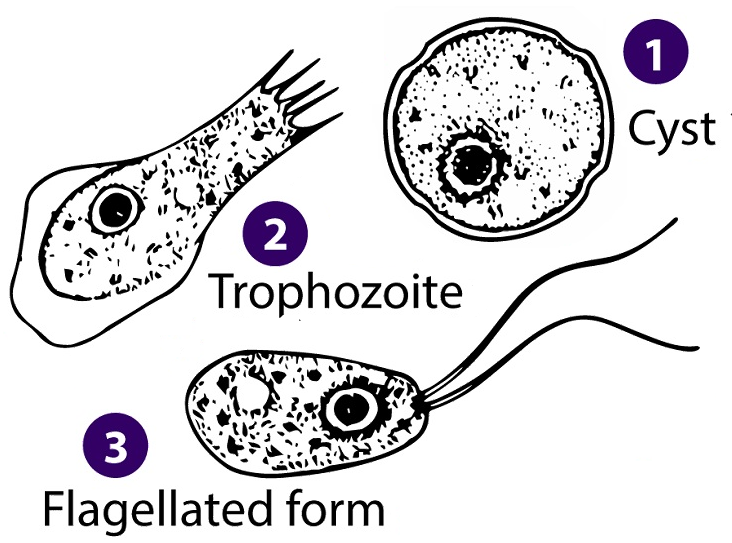
- Drawings of the three stages Naegleria fowleri's lifecycle

Scientific classification
- Domain: Eukaryota
- Supergroup: Discoba
- Phylum: Heterolobosea
- Class: Eutetramitea
- Order: Naegleriida
- Family: Naegleriidae
- Genus: Naegleria
- Species: N. fowleri

Binomial name
- Naegleria fowleri R.F.Carter, 1970

= Naegleria fowleri =

Species of protozoa

Naegleria fowleri, also known as the brain-eating amoeba or brain-eating amoeboid, is a species of the genus Naegleria. It belongs to the phylum Percolozoa and is classified as an amoeboflagellate excavate, an organism capable of behaving as both an amoeba and a flagellate. This free-living microorganism primarily feeds on bacteria, but can become pathogenic in humans, causing an extremely rare, sudden, severe, and almost always fatal brain infection known as primary amoebic meningoencephalitis (PAM), also known as naegleriasis.

It is typically found in warm freshwater bodies such as lakes, rivers, hot springs, warm water discharge from industrial or power plants, geothermal well water, poorly maintained or minimally chlorinated swimming pools with residual chlorine levels under 0.5 g/m^{3}, water heaters, soil, and pipes connected to tap water. It can exist in either an amoeboid or temporary flagellate stage.

== Etymology ==
The genus Naegleria was established by Alexis Alexeieff in 1912, who grouped the flagellate amoeba. He coined the term Naegleria after Kurt Nägler, who researched amoebae.

The species was named after Malcolm Fowler, an Australian pathologist at Adelaide Children's Hospital, who was the first author of the original series of case reports (British Medical Journal, starting 1965) of PAM.

== Life cycle ==
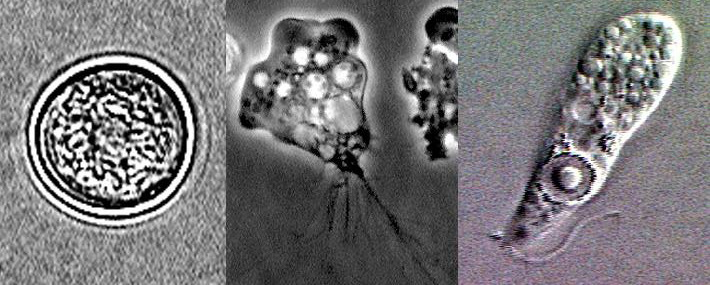
N. fowleri lifecycle stages - cyst, trophozoite, flagellate (left to right)

Naegleria fowleri, a thermophilic and free-living amoeba, is primarily found in warm and hot freshwater environments such as ponds, lakes, rivers, hot springs, and poorly maintained swimming pools. As temperatures rise, its population tends to increase. Although the amoeba was initially identified in Australia in the 1960s, it is believed to have evolved in the United States. N. fowleri exists in three forms—cyst, trophozoite (ameboid), and biflagellate. While it does not form cysts in solid human tissue, where only the amoeboid trophozoite stage is present, the flagellate form has been discovered in cerebrospinal fluid.

=== Cyst stage ===
To endure harsh environmental conditions, trophozoites transform into microbial cysts, spherical, single-layered structures about 7–15 μm in diameter, enclosing a single cell nucleus. Acting as a resilient capsule, the cyst enables the amoeba to withstand adverse circumstances. Factors triggering cyst formation include food scarcity, overcrowding, desiccation, waste accumulation, and cold temperatures. When conditions improve, the amoeba can emerge through the pore or ostiole at the center of the cyst. N. fowleri has been observed to encyst at temperatures below 10 °C (50 °F).

=== Trophozoite stage ===
The trophozoite stage is the infective phase for humans, during which the organism can actively feed and replicate. The trophozoite attaches to the olfactory epithelium, follows the axons of olfactory receptor neurons through the cribriform plate in the nasal cavity, and enters the brain. This reproductive stage of the protozoan organism transforms around 25 °C (77 °F), and thrives best around 42 °C (108 °F), multiplying through binary fission.

Trophozoites are characterized by a nucleus surrounded by a flexible membrane. They move via pseudopodia, extending parts of their cell membrane (pseudopods) and filling them with protoplasm to facilitate locomotion. Pseudopods form in the direction of movement. In their free-living state, trophozoites feed on bacteria. In tissues, they appear to phagocytize (enclose and digest) red blood cells and cause tissue damage either through the release of cytolytic substances or by direct cell-to-cell contact using cytolytic membrane proteins.

As trophozoites, N. fowleri may develop about one to 12 structures on their membrane known as amoebastomes, also referred to as "suckers" or "food cups", which they use for feeding via a trogocytosis-like mechanism.

=== Flagellate stage ===
The flagellated stage of N. fowleri is pear-shaped and biflagellate (with two flagella). This stage can be inhaled into the nasal cavity, typically during activities such as swimming or diving. The flagellate form develops when trophozoites are exposed to a change in ionic strength in the fluid where it is, such as being placed in distilled water. The flagellated form does not exist in human tissue, but can be present in the cerebrospinal fluid. Once inside the nasal cavity, the flagellated form transforms into a trophozoite within a few hours.

=== Ecology ===
Naegleria fowleri, an excavate, inhabits soil and water. It is sensitive to drying and acidic conditions, and cannot survive in seawater. The amoeba thrives at moderately elevated temperatures, making infections more likely during the summer months. N. fowleri is a facultative thermophile, capable of growing at temperatures up to 46 °C (115 °F). Warm, fresh water with an ample supply of bacteria as food provides a suitable habitat for amoebae. Locations where many amoebic infections have occurred include artificial bodies of water, disturbed natural habitats, areas with soil, and unchlorinated or unfiltered water.

N. fowleri appears to flourish during periods of disturbance. The "flagellate-empty" hypothesis suggests that N. fowleri's success may stem from decreased competition when thermosensitive protozoal fauna do not survive temperature changes. In other words, N. fowleri thrives when other predators consuming its food supply are absent. This hypothesis implies that human disturbances, such as thermal pollution, increase the abundance of N. fowleri by eliminating its resource competitors. Amoeboflagellates have a motile, flagellated stage that aids in dispersal, which is advantageous in environments cleared of competing organisms.

== Pathogenicity ==
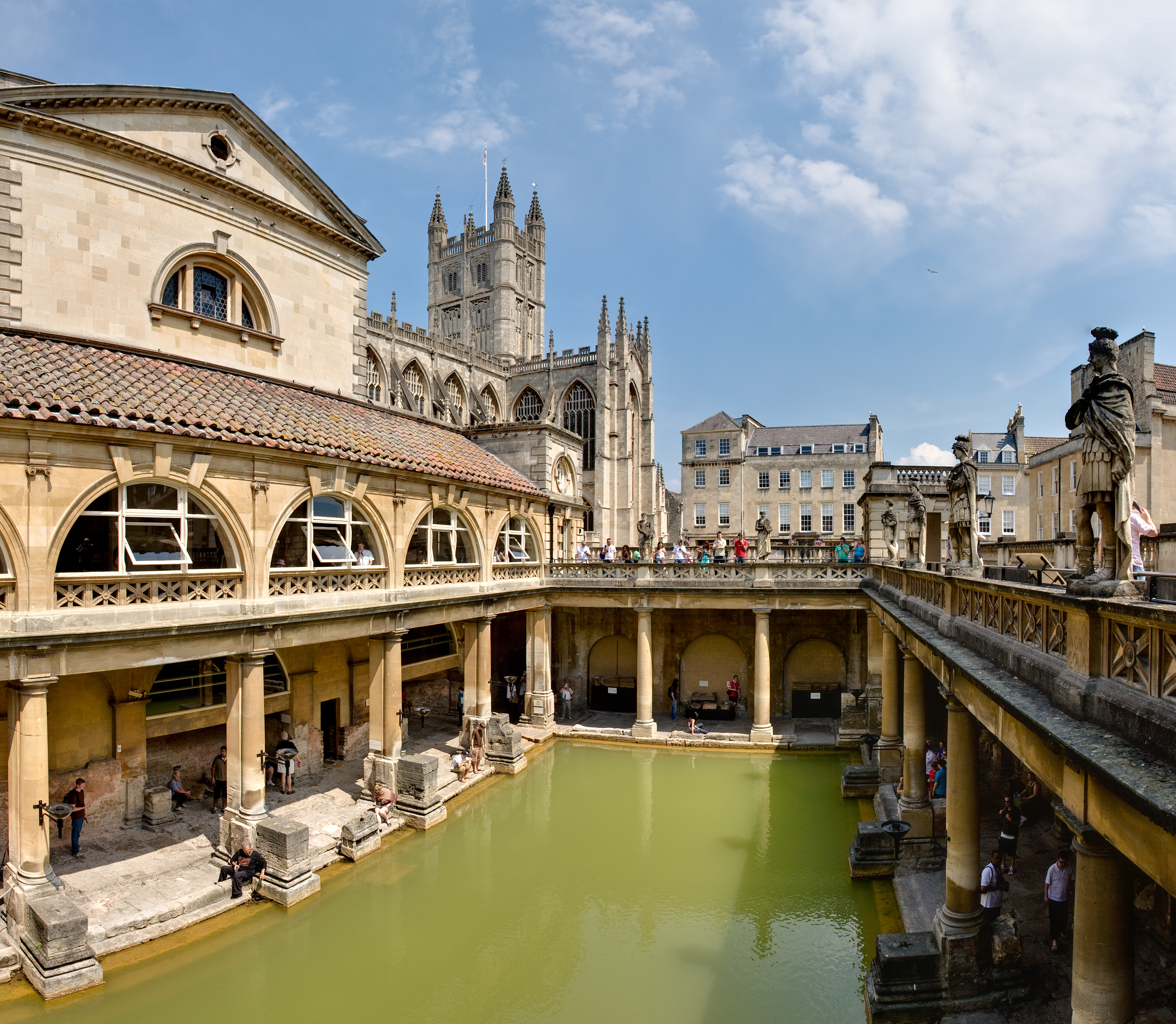
Roman Baths in Bath, England, closed for bathing since 1978 due to the presence of N. fowleri

N. fowleri may cause a typically fatal infection of the brain called primary amoebic meningoencephalitis (PAM), amoebic encephalitis/meningitis, or simply Naegleria infection. Infections most often occur when water containing N. fowleri is inhaled through the nose (aspirated), where it then enters the nasal and olfactory nerve tissue, travelling to the brain through the cribriform plate. Swallowing contaminated water does not cause infection by N. fowleri. Infections typically occur after swimming in warm-climate freshwater, although there have been cases in cooler climates such as Minnesota, US. In rare cases, infection has been caused by nasal or sinus rinsing with contaminated water in a nasal rinsing device such as a neti pot. These account for 9% of worldwide cases. PAM diagnosis will likely become more common as climate change causes surface water temperatures to rise.

N. fowleri normally eats bacteria, but during human infections, the trophozoites consume astrocytes and neurons. The reason why N. fowleri passes across the cribriform plate is not known, but the neurotransmitter acetylcholine has been suggested as a stimulus precipitating the action, as a structural homolog of animal CHRM1 is present in Naegleria and Acanthamoeba.

The disease presents diagnostic challenges to medical professionals as early symptoms can be mild. 16% of cases presented with early flu-like symptoms only. Symptoms may also appear similar to viral or bacterial meningitis, which may delay correct diagnosis and treatment. Most cases have been diagnosed post-mortem following a biopsy of the patient's brain tissue. It takes one to twelve days, median five, for symptoms to appear after nasal exposure to N. fowleri flagellates. Symptoms may include headache, fever, nausea, vomiting, loss of appetite, altered mental state, coma, drooping eyelid, blurred vision, and loss of the sense of taste. Later symptoms may include stiff neck, confusion, lack of attention, loss of balance, seizures, and hallucinations. Once symptoms begin to appear, the patient usually dies within two weeks. N. fowleri is not contagious; an infected person cannot transmit the infection.

Primary amoebic meningoencephalitis is classified as a rare disease in the United States, as it affects fewer than 200,000 people. From 2013 to 2022, 29 infections were reported in the US, which compares with about 4,000 annual deaths by drowning. It is so rare that individual cases are often reported internationally, with 381 cases reported globally. The true number of cases is likely to be higher than those reported due to problems related with diagnosis, access to diagnostic testing and a lack of surveillance. Over 40% of all known global cases of primary amoebic meningoencephalitis are reported in the United States.

Animals can become infected by Naegleria fowleri. This is rarely observed, although many cases are thought to be overlooked. Experimentally, mice, guinea pigs, and sheep have been infected, and there have been reports of South American tapirs and cattle contracting PAM.

== Treatment ==
The core antimicrobial treatment consists of the anti-fungal drug amphotericin B, which inhibits the pathogen by binding to its cell membrane sterols, causing cell membrane disruption and pathogen death; however, even with this treatment, the fatality rate was historically greater than 97%. An outbreak in Kerala, India, showed a 45.5% fatality rate in 2025 and a 24% fatality rate in 2026. These changes in fatality rate were largely due to the immediate diagnosis of the disease, where anyone with meningitis symptoms who had been in contact with warm freshwater in the past 12 days would have their treatment started immediately without waiting for the lab results. New treatments are being sought. Miltefosine, an antiparasitic drug that inhibits the pathogen via disrupting its cell survival signal pathway PI3K/Akt/mTOR, has been used in a few cases with mixed results. Other treatments include dexamethasone and therapeutic hypothermia, that may be utilised to reduce inflammation. Therapeutic hypothermia reduces the body's temperature to a hypothermic state to prevent further brain injury resulting from hyper inflammation and increased intracranial pressure.

A key factor in effective treatment is the speed of diagnosis. Primary amoebic meningoencephalitis is not common and is often not considered as a likely diagnosis; therefore, the clinical laboratory's identification of the microorganism may be the first time an amoebic etiology is considered. Rapid identification can help to avoid delays in diagnosis and therapy. Amoeba cultures and real-time polymerase chain reaction (PCR) studies for N. fowleri are diagnostic of PAM, but they are not readily available at most institutions and would have to be carried out at a reference laboratory. The time of presentation of the patient may affect the identification of the microorganism also, as PAM has an incubation period ranging from 1 to 12 days. The clinical signs of PAM are similar to bacterial and viral meningitis, including fever, neck stiffness, and severe headaches. Symptoms can progress to prolonged nausea, vomiting, and even seizures. The disease can progress to acute hemorrhagic necrotizing meningoencephalitis. After symptoms start, the patient typically dies within 1 to 18 days, typically about 5 days. A variable delay in treatment can be secondary to time intervals in multiple stages of care, including exposure to the exhibition of symptoms; arrival for treatment at a health care facility; workup of the diagnosis (initial diagnosis of likely bacterial meningitis); and finally, from diagnosis to initiation of recommended therapy. Successful treatment of PAM is rare; treatment can only be attempted after correct diagnosis, which relies on rapid recognition of the microorganism by medical technologists and pathologists. It is critical that medical technologists consistently provide timely CSF evaluation, explore the diagnosis of PAM, and look for amoebae in the setting of meningitis, especially in summer.

== Preventing human infection ==
A large proportion of reported cases of infection had a history of freshwater exposure, 58% from swimming or diving, 16% from bathing, 10% from water sports such as jet skiing, water skiing, and wakeboarding, and 9% from nasal irrigation. Methods of infection prevention, therefore, focus on precautions to be taken around water to prevent water from entering the nose, particularly during warmer weather. Wearing a nose clip when swimming may help prevent contaminated water from travelling up the nasal cavity. Keeping the head above water and not jumping or diving into warm freshwater may also prevent contaminated water from going up the nose. Swimmers should also avoid digging or stirring up sediment at the bottom of lakes, ponds, and rivers, as this is where amoebae are most likely to live.

When irrigating sinuses or taking part in ritual cleansing of the nasal cavity, it is advised to use distilled water or tap water that has been boiled and then cooled.

== See also ==
- Acanthamoeba – an amoeba that can cause amoebic keratitis and encephalitis in humans
- Balamuthia mandrillaris – an amoeba that is the cause of (often fatal) granulomatous amoebic meningoencephalitis
- Climate change and infectious diseases
- Entamoeba histolytica – an amoeba that is the cause of amoebiasis, or amoebic dysentery
- Leptospira – a zoonotic bacteria that causes leptospirosis
- Methicillin-resistant Staphylococcus aureus (MRSA)
- Necrotizing fasciitis – the "flesh-eating disease", caused by certain types of bacteria
- Toxoplasma gondii – cat-carried protozoan that causes the disease toxoplasmosis
- Vibrio vulnificus – warm saltwater infectious bacteria
