= Psalteriomonas lanterna =

Scientific classification
- Domain: Eukaryota
- (unranked): Excavata
- Phylum: Percolozoa
- Class: Heterolobosea
- Order: Schizopyrenida
- Family: Vahlkampfiidae
- Genus: Psalteriomonas
- Species: P. lanterna

Binomial name
- Psalteriomonas lanterna Broers, Stumm, Vogels & Brugerolle, 1990

Species of protist

Psalteriomonas lanterna is a species of amoebae in the group of Heterolobosea. The cells of the flagellate stage show four nuclei, four ventral grooves and four mastigont systems, each with four flagella. It lacks a Golgi apparatus and reproduction occurs in both stages of its life cycle.
