= Vahlkampfia jugosa =

Scientific classification
- Domain: Eukaryota
- Supergroup: Discoba
- Phylum: Heterolobosea
- Order: Schizopyrenida
- Family: Vahlkampfiidae
- Genus: Vahlkampfia
- Species: V. jugosa

Binomial name
- Vahlkampfia jugosa Page, 1967

Species of single-celled organism

Vahlkampfia jugosa is a species of excavates. It has a PAS-positive surface layer and forms cysts in culture.
