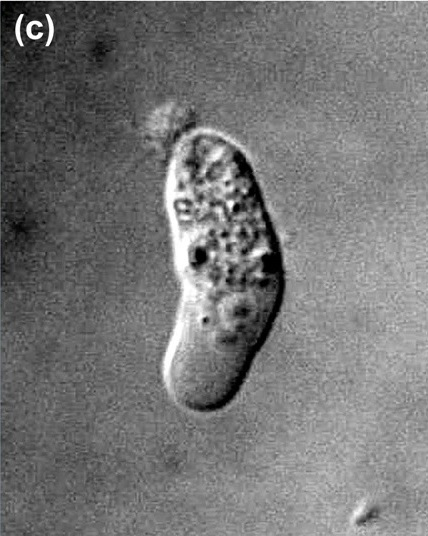
- Tetramitus
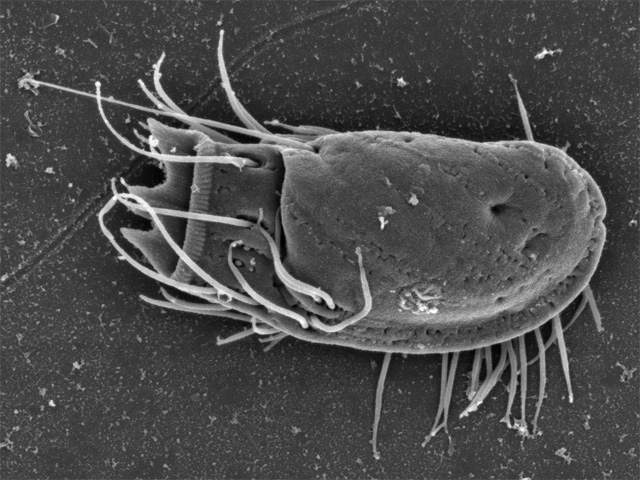
- Stephanopogon sp.

Scientific classification
- Domain: Eukaryota
- Clade: Discoba
- Phylum: Percolozoa
- Subphylum: Tetramitia

Classes
- Acrastidae; Creneidae; Euplaesiobystra; Eutetramitea; Fumarolamoeba; Gruberellidae; Heteraomeba; Naegleria; Neovahlkampfiidae; Percolomonadidae; Psalteriomonadidae; Selenaionea; Stephanopogonidae; Tetramitus; Tulamoebidae

= Tetramitia =

Subphylum of Heterolobosea

Tetramitia is one of the two major subphyla within the protist phylum Heterolobosea (the other is Pharyngomonada).

== Taxonomy ==
This subphylum is a member of Heterolobosea that contains many different groups:

1. Acrastidae
2. Creneidae
3. Euplaesiobystra
4. Eutetramitea
5. Fumarolamoeba
6. Gruberellidae
7. Heteraomeba
8. Naegleria
9. Neovahlkampfiidae
10. Percolomonadidae
11. Psalteriomonadidae
12. Selenaionea
13. Stephanopogonidae
14. Tetramitus
15. Tulamoebidae

=== Phylogeny ===
The phylogeny seen below is mainly based on this paper (see also a second paper). Tetramitia is divided into two major groups, Selenaionea and Eutetramitea. This first clade contains Neovahlkampfiida, Selenaionida, Gruberellidae and Euplaesiobystra. The second clade contains Neagleria, Percolomonadidae, Psalteriomonadidae, Creneidae, Lyromonadida and etc.

- Heterolobosea
  - Pharyngomonada
    - Pharyngomonadea
      - Pharyngomonadida
        Pharyngomonadidae
  - Tetramitia
    - Selenaionea
      - Neovahlkampfiida
      - Selenaionida
    - Eutetramitea
      - Naegleriida
      - - - - Percolomonadida
            - ?
              Pseudociliatida
          - Creneida
        - Lyromonadida
