= Protonaegleria =

Scientific classification
- Domain: Eukaryota
- Clade: Discoba
- Phylum: Heterolobosea
- Order: Schizopyrenida
- Family: Vahlkampfiidae
- Genus: Protonaegleria; Michel 1985

Type species
- Protonaegleria westphali Michel 1985

Genus of protozoa

Protonaegleria is a genus of excavates.
