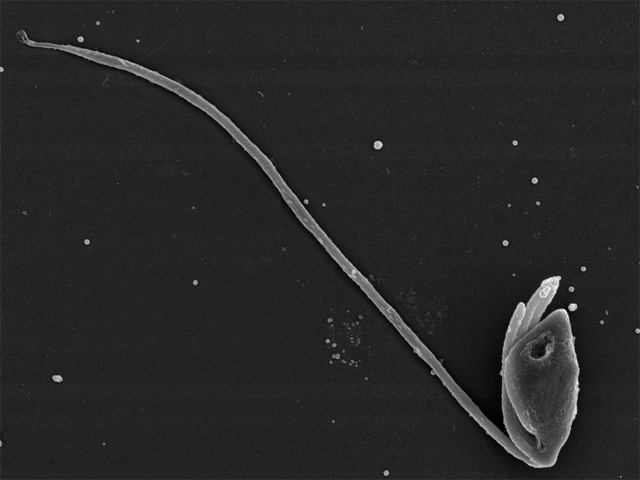
- Percolomonas sp.

Scientific classification
- Domain: Eukaryota
- (unranked): incertae sedis
- Clade: Discoba
- Phylum: Heterolobosea
- Subphylum: Tetramitia
- Class: Percolatea

Genera
- Percolomonas; Stephanopogon

= Percolatea =

Class of protists

Percolatea are a class of excavates in the phylum Percolozoa.
