= P ring =

Part of certain bacteria

The P ring forms part of the basal body of the bacterial appendage known as the flagellum. It is known to be embedded in the peptidoglycan cell wall. Together with the L ring, it has the function of anchoring the flagellum to the cell surface.
