= Sawyeria =

Scientific classification
- Domain: Eukaryota
- Supergroup: Discoba
- Phylum: Heterolobosea
- Order: Schizopyrenida
- Family: Vahlkampfiidae
- Genus: Sawyeria; O'Kelly et al., 2003
- Species: S. marylandensis

Binomial name
- Sawyeria marylandensis O'Kelly et al., 2003

Genus of amoebae

Sawyeria marylandensis is a species of amoebae, placed in the monotypic genus Sawyeria, and belonging to the group Heterolobosea.
