= Flagellum =

Cellular appendage functioning as locomotive or sensory organelle

- Structure of bacterial flagellum

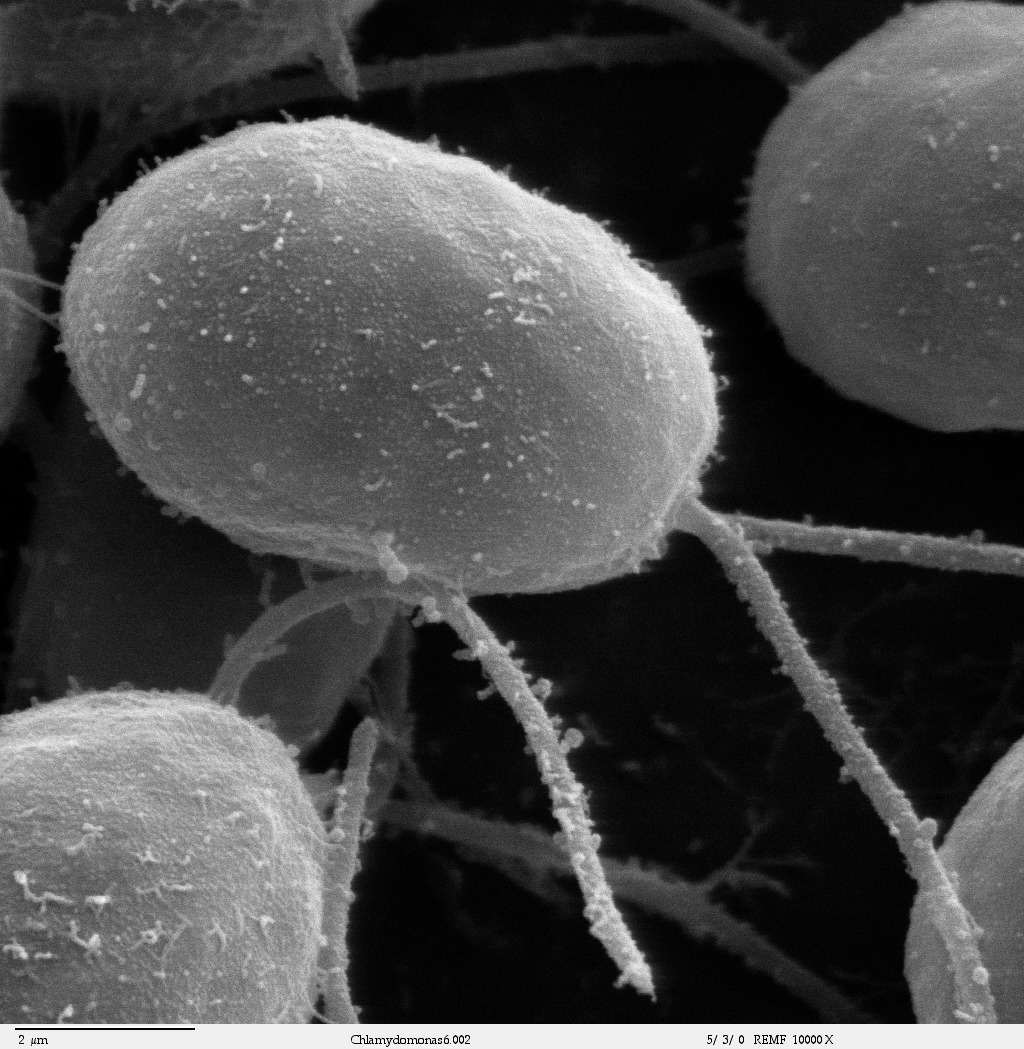
- SEM image of flagellated eukaryote Chlamydomonas sp. (10000×)

Identifiers
- MeSH: D005407
- TH: H1.00.01.1.01032
- FMA: 67472

A flagellum (/fləˈdʒɛləm/; pl.: flagella) (Latin for 'whip' or 'scourge') is a hair-like appendage that protrudes from certain plant and animal sperm cells, from fungal spores (zoospores), and from a wide range of microorganisms to provide motility. some protists with flagella are known as flagellates.

Across the three domains of Bacteria, Archaea, and Eukaryota, the flagellum has a different structure, protein composition, and mechanism of propulsion but shares the same function of providing motility. The Latin word flagellum means "whip" to describe its lash-like swimming motion.

The flagella of bacteria and archaea, prokaryotes, are rotor-like structures that propel the organism via rotation. While very similar to bacterial flagella, the flagellum in archaea is called the archaellum to note its difference from the bacterial flagellum.

Eukaryotic flagella differ from prokaryotic flagella as they are large membrane protrusions supported by the cytoskeleton, which wave back and forth rather than rotate. Eukaryotic cilia are very similar to flagella but are much shorter. Surface-attached cilia and flagella are used to swim or move fluid from one region to another.

A cell may have zero, one, or many flagella depending on the species and cell type. A gram-negative bacterium Helicobacter pylori, for example, uses its flagella to propel itself through the stomach to reach the mucous lining where it may colonise the epithelium and potentially cause gastritis, and ulcers – a risk factor for stomach cancer. Flagella in some cases may have functions other than or in addition to motility. For example, Salmonella typhimurium can sense wetness of the surrounding environment using its flagella.

== Types ==
Prokaryotic (bacterial and archaeal) flagella run in a rotary movement, while eukaryotic flagella run in a bending movement. The prokaryotic flagellum uses a rotary motor, and the eukaryotic flagellum uses a complex sliding filament system. Eukaryotic flagella are ATP-driven, while prokaryotic flagella can be ATP-driven (Archaea) or proton-driven (Bacteria).

The three types of flagella are bacterial, archaeal, and eukaryotic.

The flagella in eukaryotes have dynein and microtubules that move with a bending mechanism. Bacteria and archaea do not have dynein or microtubules in their flagella, and they move using a rotary mechanism.

Other differences among these three types are:

- Bacterial flagella are helical filaments, each with a rotary motor at its base which can turn clockwise or counterclockwise. They provide two of several kinds of bacterial motility.
- Archaeal flagella (archaella) are superficially similar to bacterial flagella in that it also has a rotary motor, but are different in many details and considered non-homologous.
- Eukaryotic flagella—those of animal, plant, and protist cells—are complex cellular projections that lash back and forth. Eukaryotic flagella and motile cilia are identical in structure, but have different lengths, waveforms, and functions. Primary cilia are immotile, and have a structurally different 9+0 axoneme rather than the 9+2 axoneme found in both flagella and motile cilia.

=== Bacterial flagella ===
==== Structure and composition ====
The assembly and function of bacterial flagella requires over 50 proteins in coordination. The bacterial flagellum is made up of protein subunits of flagellin. Its shape is a 20-nanometer-thick hollow tube. It is helical and has a sharp bend just outside the outer membrane; this "hook" allows the axis of the helix to point directly away from the cell. A shaft runs between the hook and the basal body, passing through protein rings in the cell's membrane that act as bearings. Gram-positive organisms have two of these basal body rings, one in the peptidoglycan layer and one in the plasma membrane. Gram-negative organisms have four such rings: the L ring associates with the lipopolysaccharides, the P ring associates with peptidoglycan layer, the M ring is embedded in the plasma membrane, and the S ring is directly attached to the cytoplasm. The filament ends with a capping protein.

The flagellar filament is the long, helical screw that propels the bacterium when rotated by the motor, through the hook. In most bacteria that have been studied, including the gram-negative Escherichia coli, Salmonella typhimurium, Caulobacter crescentus, and Vibrio alginolyticus, the filament is made up of 11 protofilaments approximately parallel to the filament axis. Each protofilament is a series of tandem protein chains. However, Campylobacter jejuni has seven protofilaments.

The basal body has several traits in common with some types of secretory pores, such as the hollow, rod-like "plug" in their centers extending out through the plasma membrane. The similarities between bacterial flagella and bacterial secretory system structures and proteins provide scientific evidence supporting the theory that bacterial flagella evolved from the type-three secretion system (TTSS).

The atomic structure of both bacterial flagella as well as the TTSS injectisome have been elucidated in great detail, especially with the development of cryo-electron microscopy. The best understood parts are the parts between the inner and outer membrane, that is, the scaffolding rings of the inner membrane (IM), the scaffolding pairs of the outer membrane (OM), and the rod/needle (injectisome) or rod/hook (flagellum) sections.

==== Motor ====
Bacterial flagellar motor assembly

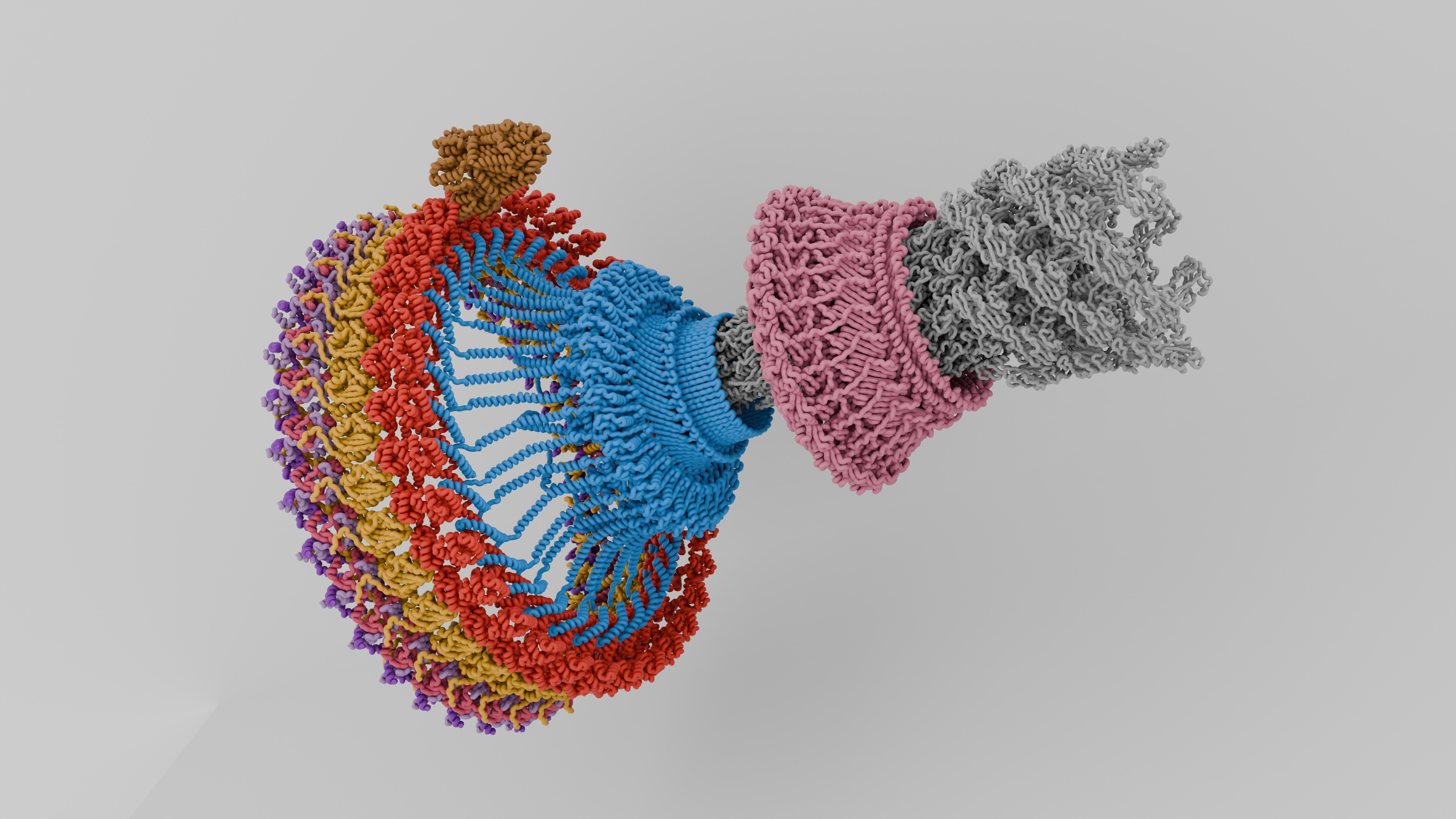
Shown here is the C-ring at the base with FliG in red, FliM in yellow, and FliN in shades of purple; the MS-ring in blue; the MotAB in brown; the LP-ring in pink; and the rod in gray.

Nature's incredible rotating motor – YouTube

The bacterial flagellum is driven by a rotary engine (Mot complex) made up of protein, located at the flagellum's anchor point on the inner cell membrane. The engine is powered by proton-motive force, i.e., by the flow of protons (hydrogen ions) across the bacterial cell membrane due to a concentration gradient set up by the cell's metabolism (Vibrio species have two kinds of flagella, lateral and polar, and some are driven by a sodium ion pump rather than a proton pump). The rotor transports protons across the membrane, and is turned in the process. The rotor alone can operate at 6,000 to 100,000 rpm, but with the flagellar filament attached usually only reaches 200 to 1000 rpm. The direction of rotation can be changed by the flagellar motor switch almost instantaneously, caused by a slight change in the position of a protein, FliG, in the rotor. The torque-generating unit is the stator which is a proton-powered rotary motor that drives the main bacterial flagellar motor. From the stator, the rotation of the MotA5 pentamer around the MotB2 dimer is anchored to the cell wall which is directly coupled to C-ring rotation. Thus, each torque-generating stator unit motor and flagellar motor rotor act like intermeshed gearwheels with a 6.2 gear ratio. Between 11 to 16 stator motors have been observed in direct relation to flagellar motor rotors in various bacteria. The torque is transferred from the MotAB to the torque helix on FliG's D5 domain and with the increase in the requirement of the torque or speed more MotAB are employed. Because the flagellar motor has no on-off switch, the protein epsE is used as a mechanical clutch to disengage the motor from the rotor, thus stopping the flagellum and allowing the bacterium to remain in one place.

The production and rotation of a flagellum can take up to 10% of an Escherichia coli cell's energy budget which confers long-term benefits in that anything that imparts a fitness disadvantage, may face elimination over time. Its operation generates reactive oxygen species that elevate mutation rates.

The cylindrical shape of flagella is suited to locomotion of microscopic organisms; these organisms operate at a low Reynolds number, where the viscosity of the surrounding water is much more important than its mass or inertia.

The rotational speed of flagella varies in response to the intensity of the proton-motive force, thereby permitting certain forms of speed control, and also permitting some types of bacteria to attain remarkable speeds in proportion to their size; some achieve roughly 60 cell lengths per second. At such a speed, a bacterium would take about 245 days to cover 1 km; although that may seem slow, the perspective changes when the concept of scale is introduced. In comparison to macroscopic life forms, it is very fast indeed when expressed in terms of number of body lengths per second. A cheetah, for example, only achieves about 25 body lengths per second.

Through use of their flagella, bacteria are able to move rapidly towards attractants and away from repellents, by means of a biased random walk, with runs and tumbles brought about by rotating its flagellum counterclockwise and clockwise, respectively. The two directions of rotation are not identical (with respect to flagellum movement) and are selected by a molecular switch. Clockwise rotation is called the traction mode with the body following the flagella. Counterclockwise rotation is called the thruster mode with the flagella lagging behind the body.

==== Assembly ====
During flagellar assembly, components of the flagellum pass through the hollow cores of the basal body and the nascent filament. During assembly, protein components are added at the flagellar tip rather than at the base. In vitro, flagellar filaments assemble spontaneously in a solution containing purified flagellin as the sole protein.

==== Evolution ====
At least 10 protein components of the bacterial flagellum share homologous proteins with the type three secretion system (T3SS) found in many gram-negative bacteria, hence one likely evolved from the other. Because the T3SS has a similar number of components as a flagellar apparatus (about 25 proteins), which one evolved first is difficult to determine. However, the flagellar system appears to involve more proteins overall, including various regulators and chaperones, hence it has been argued that flagella evolved from a T3SS. However, it has also been suggested that the flagellum may have evolved first or the two structures evolved in parallel. Early single-cell organisms' need for motility (mobility) support that the more mobile flagella would be selected by evolution first, but the T3SS evolving from the flagellum can be seen as 'reductive evolution', and receives no topological support from the phylogenetic trees. The hypothesis that the two structures evolved separately from a common ancestor accounts for the protein similarities between the two structures, as well as their functional diversity.

==== Flagella and the intelligent design movement ====
Some authors have argued that flagella cannot have evolved, assuming that they can only function properly when all proteins are in place. In other words, the flagellar apparatus is "irreducibly complex". However, many proteins can be deleted or mutated and the flagellum still works, though sometimes at reduced efficiency. Moreover, with many proteins unique to some number across species, diversity of bacterial flagella composition was higher than expected. Hence, the flagellar apparatus is clearly very flexible in evolutionary terms and perfectly able to lose or gain protein components. For instance, a number of mutations have been found that increase the motility of E. coli. Additional evidence for the evolution of bacterial flagella includes the existence of vestigial flagella, intermediate forms of flagella and patterns of similarities among flagellar protein sequences, including the observation that almost all of the core flagellar proteins have known homologies with non-flagellar proteins. Furthermore, several processes have been identified as playing important roles in flagellar evolution, including self-assembly of simple repeating subunits, gene duplication with subsequent divergence, recruitment of elements from other systems ('molecular bricolage') and recombination.

==== Flagellar arrangements ====
Different species of bacteria have different numbers and arrangements of flagella, named using the term tricho, from the Greek trichos meaning hair.

- Monotrichous bacteria such as Vibrio cholerae have a single polar flagellum.
- Amphitrichous bacteria have a single flagellum on each of two opposite ends (e.g., Campylobacter jejuni or Alcaligenes faecalis)—both flagella rotate but coordinate to produce coherent thrust.
- Lophotrichous bacteria (lopho Greek combining term meaning crest or tuft) have multiple flagella located at the same spot on the bacterial surface such as Helicobacter pylori, which act in concert to drive the bacteria in a single direction. In many cases, the bases of multiple flagella are surrounded by a specialized region of the cell membrane, called the polar organelle.
- Peritrichous bacteria have flagella projecting in all directions (e.g., E. coli).

Spirochetes, in contrast, have flagella called endoflagella arising from opposite poles of the cell, and are located within the periplasmic space as shown by breaking the outer-membrane and also by electron cryotomography microscopy. The rotation of the filaments relative to the cell body causes the entire bacterium to move forward in a corkscrew-like motion, even through material viscous enough to prevent the passage of normally flagellated bacteria.

In certain large forms of Selenomonas, more than 30 individual flagella are organized outside the cell body, helically twining about each other to form a thick structure (easily visible with the light microscope) called a "fascicle".

In some Vibrio spp. (particularly Vibrio parahaemolyticus) and related bacteria such as Aeromonas, two flagellar systems co-exist, using different sets of genes and different ion gradients for energy. The polar flagella are constitutively expressed and provide motility in bulk fluid, while the lateral flagella are expressed when the polar flagella meet too much resistance to turn. These provide swarming motility on surfaces or in viscous fluids.

===== Bundling =====
Bundling is a phenomenon in multi-flagellated cells where flagella cluster together and rotate in a synchronized manner to facilitate movement. These flagella, characterized by their left-handed helical structure, align and spin as a unit when their molecular rotors turn counterclockwise, driving the cell forward through its environment. When the rotors reverse to a clockwise direction, the flagella unravel from the bundle, disrupting their coordinated motion. This unraveling triggers a behavior known as tumbling, where the cell ceases its forward trajectory and instead twitches or jiggles in place. Tumbling results in a random reorientation of the cell, effectively changing the direction of its subsequent forward swimming. This process is critical for bacteria like Escherichia coli, enabling them to navigate complex environments by alternating between directed swimming and random reorientation. The mechanism of bundling and tumbling highlights the intricate motility strategies of microorganisms, allowing them to respond to environmental stimuli. This behavior is well-studied in bacterial chemotaxis, where cells adjust their path toward favorable conditions.

In the model describing chemotaxis ("movement on purpose") the clockwise rotation of a flagellum is suppressed by chemical compounds favorable to the cell (e.g. food). When moving in a favorable direction, the concentration of such chemical attractants increases and therefore tumbles are continually suppressed, allowing forward motion; likewise, when the cell's direction of motion is unfavorable (e.g., away from a chemical attractant), tumbles are no longer suppressed and occur much more often, with the chance that the cell will be thus reoriented in the correct direction.

Even if all flagella would rotate clockwise, however, they often cannot form a bundle due to geometrical and hydrodynamic reasons.

===== Molecular mechanism of rotational switching =====
The flagellar motor is made entirely of proteins. The stator is the torque-generating unit and is a proton-powered rotary motor that drives the main bacterial flagellar motor. From the stator, the rotation of the MotA5 pentamer around the MotB2 dimer is anchored like a gear wheel to the cell wall which is directly coupled to C-ring rotation and, therefore, acts as a force generator by interacting with the C-ring of the rotor. As the C-ring can rotate bi-directionally, while the stator complexes themselves rotate unidirectionally, the C-ring must undergo internal rearrangement. During this rearrangement, the C-ring does not break down and rebuild, instead protein domains undergo coordinated conformational changes.

The C-ring has binding sites for switching signals, such as phosphorylated CheY-protein, which initiates a cascade of internal rearrangements. Multiple protein domains within the C-ring undergo reorientation, including both the FliGN and FliGM domains, which rotate and change position along with the FliGC domain. These coordinated domain flips cause the stator to switch its position relative to the C-ring. When the stator applies force from the outside of the C-ring, the rotor spins counterclockwise (bundling). When the stator repositions to apply force to the internal face of the C-ring, the rotor spins clockwise (tumbling). Although the stator's own rotational mechanism remains constant, the direction from which it applies force to the C-ring determines the direction in which the rotor spins. These findings are based on structures of Salmonella Typhimurium flagellar motors. While the core motor components are highly conserved across bacterial species, it remains unclear whether this specific switching mechanism is universally conserved or if different bacterial species employ variations of this strategy.

=== Eukaryotic flagella ===
Eukaryotic flagella. 1–axoneme, 2–cell membrane, 3–IFT (IntraFlagellar Transport), 4–Basal body, 5–Cross section of flagella, 6–Triplets of microtubules of basal body

Cross section of an axoneme

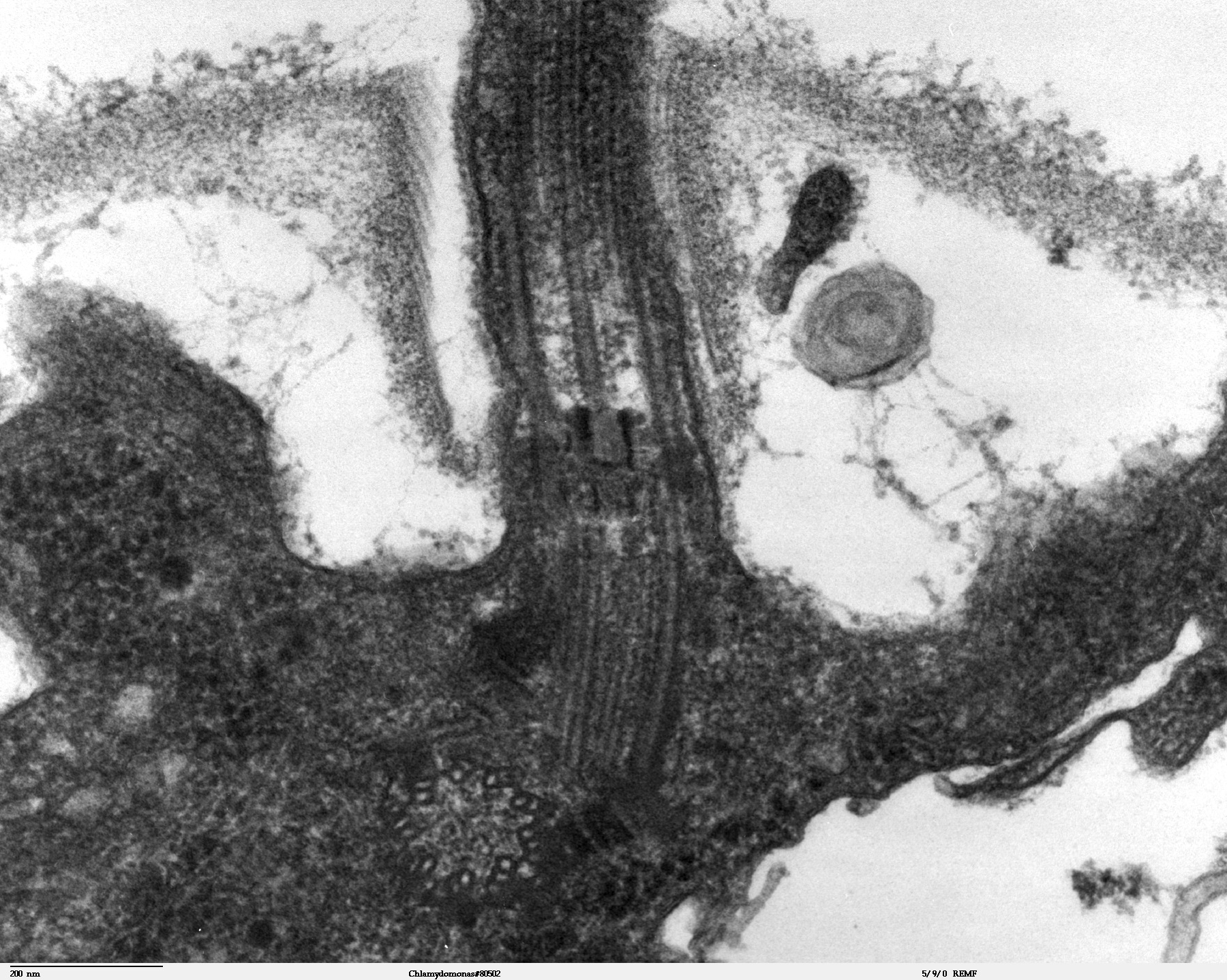
Longitudinal section through the flagella area in Chlamydomonas reinhardtii. In the cell apex is the basal body that is the anchoring site for a flagellum. Basal bodies originate from and have a substructure similar to that of centrioles, with nine peripheral microtubule triplets (see structure at bottom center of image).

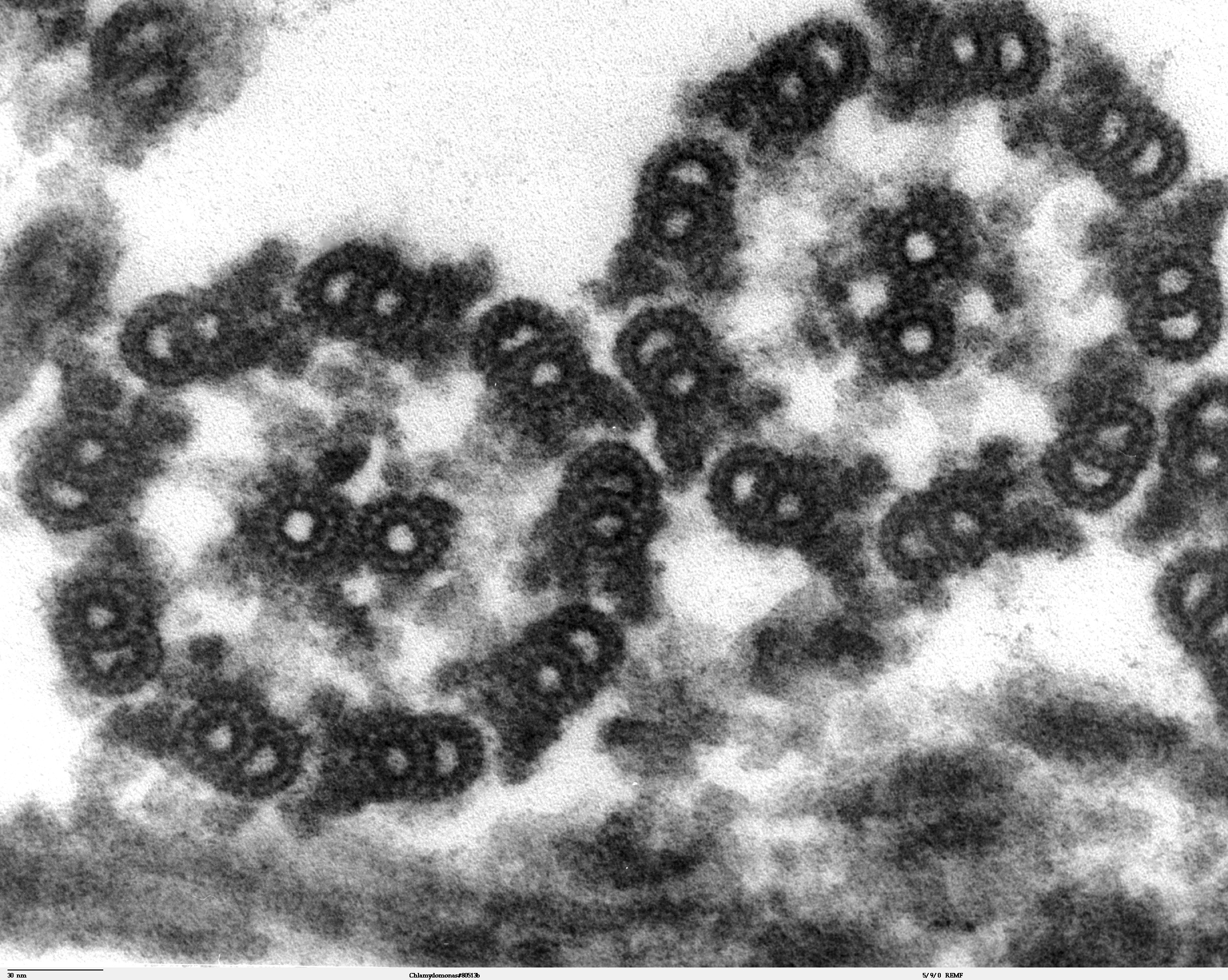
The "9+2" structure is visible in this cross-section micrograph of an axoneme.

==== Terminology ====
Aiming to emphasize the distinction between the bacterial flagella and the eukaryotic cilia and flagella, some authors attempted to replace the name of these two eukaryotic structures with "undulipodia" (e.g., all papers by Margulis since the 1970s) or "cilia" for both (e.g., Hülsmann, 1992; Adl et al., 2012; most papers of Cavalier-Smith), preserving "flagella" for the bacterial structure. However, the discriminative usage of the terms "cilia" and "flagella" for eukaryotes adopted in this article (see § Flagella versus cilia below) is still common (e.g., Andersen et al., 1991; Leadbeater et al., 2000).

==== Internal structure ====
The core of a eukaryotic flagellum, known as the axoneme is a bundle of nine fused pairs of microtubules known as doublets surrounding two central single microtubules (singlets). This 9+2 axoneme is characteristic of the eukaryotic flagellum. At the base of a eukaryotic flagellum is a basal body, "blepharoplast" or kinetosome, which is the microtubule organizing center for flagellar microtubules and is about 500 nanometers long. Basal bodies are structurally identical to centrioles. The flagellum is encased within the cell's plasma membrane, so that the interior of the flagellum is accessible to the cell's cytoplasm.

Besides the axoneme and basal body, relatively constant in morphology, other internal structures of the flagellar apparatus are the transition zone (where the axoneme and basal body meet) and the root system (microtubular or fibrillar structures that extend from the basal bodies into the cytoplasm), more variable and useful as indicators of phylogenetic relationships of eukaryotes. Other structures, more uncommon, are the paraflagellar (or paraxial, paraxonemal) rod, the R fiber, and the S fiber. For surface structures, see below.

==== Mechanism ====
Each of the outer 9 doublet microtubules extends a pair of dynein arms (an "inner" and an "outer" arm) to the adjacent microtubule; these produce force through ATP hydrolysis. The flagellar axoneme also contains radial spokes, polypeptide complexes extending from each of the outer nine microtubule doublets towards the central pair, with the "head" of the spoke facing inwards. The radial spoke is thought to be involved in the regulation of flagellar motion, although its exact function and method of action are not yet understood.

==== Flagella versus cilia ====
Beating pattern of eukaryotic "flagellum" and "cilium", a traditional distinction before the structures of the two are known

The regular beat patterns of eukaryotic cilia and flagella generate motion on a cellular level. Examples range from the propulsion of single cells such as the swimming of spermatozoa to the transport of fluid along a stationary layer of cells such as in the respiratory tract.

Although eukaryotic cilia and flagella are ultimately the same, they are sometimes classed by their pattern of movement, a tradition from before their structures have been known. In the case of flagella, the motion is often planar and wave-like, whereas the motile cilia often perform a more complicated three-dimensional motion with a power and recovery stroke. Yet another traditional form of distinction is by the number of 9+2 organelles on the cell.

==== Intraflagellar transport ====
Intraflagellar transport, the process by which axonemal subunits, transmembrane receptors, and other proteins are moved up and down the length of the flagellum, is essential for proper functioning of the flagellum, in both motility and signal transduction.

==== Evolution and occurrence ====
Eukaryotic flagella or cilia, probably an ancestral characteristic, are widespread in almost all groups of eukaryotes, as a relatively perennial condition, or as a flagellated life cycle stage (e.g., zoids, gametes, zoospores, which may be produced continually or not).

The first situation is found either in specialized cells of multicellular organisms (e.g., the choanocytes of sponges, or the ciliated epithelia of metazoans), as in ciliates and many eukaryotes with a "flagellate condition" (or "monadoid level of organization", see Flagellata, an artificial group).

Flagellated lifecycle stages are found in many groups, e.g., many green algae (zoospores and male gametes), bryophytes (male gametes), pteridophytes (male gametes), some gymnosperms (cycads and Ginkgo, as male gametes), centric diatoms (male gametes), brown algae (zoospores and gametes), oomycetes (asexual zoospores and gametes), hyphochytrids (zoospores), labyrinthulomycetes (zoospores), some apicomplexans (gametes), some radiolarians (probably gametes), foraminiferans (gametes), plasmodiophoromycetes (zoospores and gametes), myxogastrids (zoospores), metazoans (male gametes), and chytrid fungi (zoospores and gametes).

Flagella or cilia are completely absent in some groups, probably due to a loss rather than being a primitive condition. The loss of cilia occurred in red algae, some green algae (Zygnematophyceae), the gymnosperms except cycads and Ginkgo, angiosperms, pennate diatoms, some apicomplexans, some amoebozoans, in the sperm of some metazoans, and in fungi (except chytrids).

==== Typology ====
A number of terms related to flagella or cilia are used to characterize eukaryotes. According to surface structures present, flagella may be:

- whiplash flagella (= smooth, acronematic flagella): without hairs, e.g., in Opisthokonta
- hairy flagella (= tinsel, flimmer, pleuronematic flagella): with hairs (= mastigonemes sensu lato), divided in:
  - with fine hairs (= non-tubular, or simple hairs): occurs in Euglenophyceae, Dinoflagellata, some Haptophyceae (Pavlovales)
  - with stiff hairs (= tubular hairs, retronemes, mastigonemes sensu stricto), divided in:
    - bipartite hairs: with two regions. Occurs in Cryptophyceae, Prasinophyceae, and some Heterokonta
    - tripartite (= straminipilous) hairs: with three regions (a base, a tubular shaft, and one or more terminal hairs). Occurs in most Heterokonta
- stichonematic flagella: with a single row of hairs
- pantonematic flagella: with two rows of hairs
- acronematic: flagella with a single, terminal mastigoneme or flagellar hair (e.g., bodonids); some authors use the term as synonym of whiplash
- with scales: e.g., Prasinophyceae
- with spines: e.g., some brown algae
- with undulating membrane: e.g., some kinetoplastids, some parabasalids
- with proboscis (trunk-like protrusion of the cell): e.g., apusomonads, some bodonids

According to the number of flagella, cells may be: (remembering that some authors use "ciliated" instead of "flagellated")

- uniflagellated: e.g., most Opisthokonta
- biflagellated: e.g., all Dinoflagellata, the gametes of Charophyceae, of most bryophytes and of some metazoans
- triflagellated: e.g., the gametes of some Foraminifera
- quadriflagellated: e.g., some Prasinophyceae, Collodictyonidae
- octoflagellated: e.g., some Diplomonada, some Prasinophyceae
- multiflagellated: e.g., Opalinata, Ciliophora, Stephanopogon, Parabasalida, Hemimastigophora, Caryoblastea, Multicilia, the gametes (or zoids) of Oedogoniales (Chlorophyta), some pteridophytes and some gymnosperms

According to the place of insertion of the flagella:

- opisthokont: cells with flagella inserted posteriorly, e.g., in Opisthokonta (Vischer, 1945). In Haptophyceae, flagella are laterally to terminally inserted, but are directed posteriorly during rapid swimming.
- akrokont: cells with flagella inserted apically.
- subakrokont: cells with flagella inserted subapically.
- pleurokont: cells with flagella inserted laterally.

According to the beating pattern:

- gliding: a flagellum that trails on the substrate
- heterodynamic: flagella with different beating patterns (usually with one flagellum functioning in food capture and the other functioning in gliding, anchorage, propulsion or "steering").
- isodynamic: flagella beating with the same patterns.

Other terms related to the flagellar type:

- isokont: cells with flagella of equal length. It was also formerly used to refer to the Chlorophyta
- anisokont: cells with flagella of unequal length, e.g., some Euglenophyceae and Prasinophyceae
- heterokont: term introduced by Luther (1899) to refer to the Xanthophyceae, due to the pair of flagella of unequal length. It has taken on a specific meaning in referring to cells with an anterior straminipilous flagellum (with tripartite mastigonemes, in one or two rows) and a posterior usually smooth flagellum. It is also used to refer to the taxon. Heterokonta
- stephanokont: cells with a crown of flagella near its anterior end, e.g., the gametes and spores of Oedogoniales, the spores of some Bryopsidales. Term introduced by Blackman & Tansley (1902) to refer to the Oedogoniales.
- akont: cells without flagella. It was also used to refer to taxonomic groups, as Aconta or Akonta: the Zygnematophyceae and Bacillariophyceae (Oltmanns, 1904), or the Rhodophyceae (Christensen, 1962).

=== Archaeal flagella ===
The archaellum possessed by some species of Archaea is superficially similar to the bacterial flagellum; in the 1980s, they were thought to be homologous on the basis of gross morphology and behavior. Both flagella and archaella consist of filaments extending outside the cell, and rotate to propel the cell. Archaeal flagella have a unique structure which lacks a central channel. Similar to bacterial type IV pilins, the archaeal proteins (archaellins) are made with class 3 signal peptides and they are processed by a type IV prepilin peptidase-like enzyme. The archaellins are typically modified by the addition of N-linked glycans which are necessary for proper assembly or function.

Discoveries in the 1990s revealed numerous detailed differences between the archaeal and bacterial flagella. These include:

- Bacterial flagella rotation is powered by the proton motive force – a flow of H^{+} ions or occasionally by the sodium-motive force – a flow of Na^{+} ions; archaeal flagella rotation is powered by ATP.
- While bacterial cells often have many flagellar filaments, each of which rotates independently, the archaeal flagellum is composed of a bundle of many filaments that rotates as a single assembly -(Citation? It seems to not be the case in Pyrococcus furiosus).
- Bacterial flagella grow by the addition of flagellin subunits at the tip; archaeal flagella grow by the addition of subunits to the base.
- Bacterial flagella are thicker than archaella, and the bacterial filament has a large enough hollow "tube" inside that the flagellin subunits can flow up the inside of the filament and get added at the tip; the archaellum is too thin (12-15 nm) to allow this.
- Many components of bacterial flagella share sequence similarity to components of the type III secretion systems, but the components of bacterial flagella and archaella share no sequence similarity. Instead, some components of archaella share sequence and morphological similarity with components of type IV pili, which are assembled through the action of type II secretion systems (the nomenclature of pili and protein secretion systems is not consistent).

These differences support the theory that the bacterial flagella and archaella are a classic case of biological analogy, or convergent evolution, rather than homology. Research into the structure of archaella made significant progress beginning in the early 2010s, with the first atomic resolution structure of an archaella protein, the discovery of additional functions of archaella, and the first reports of archaella in Nanoarchaeota and Thaumarchaeota.

=== Fungal ===
The only fungi to have a single flagellum on their spores are the chytrids. In Batrachochytrium dendrobatidis the flagellum is 19–20 μm long. A nonfunctioning centriole lies adjacent to the kinetosome. Nine interconnected props attach the kinetosome to the plasmalemma, and a terminal plate is present in the transitional zone. An inner ring-like structure attached to the tubules of the flagellar doublets within the transitional zone has been observed in transverse section.

== Additional images ==
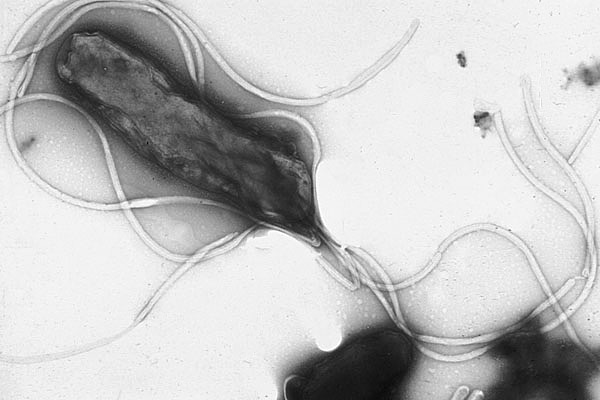
Multiple flagella in lophotrichous arrangement on surface of Helicobacter pylori

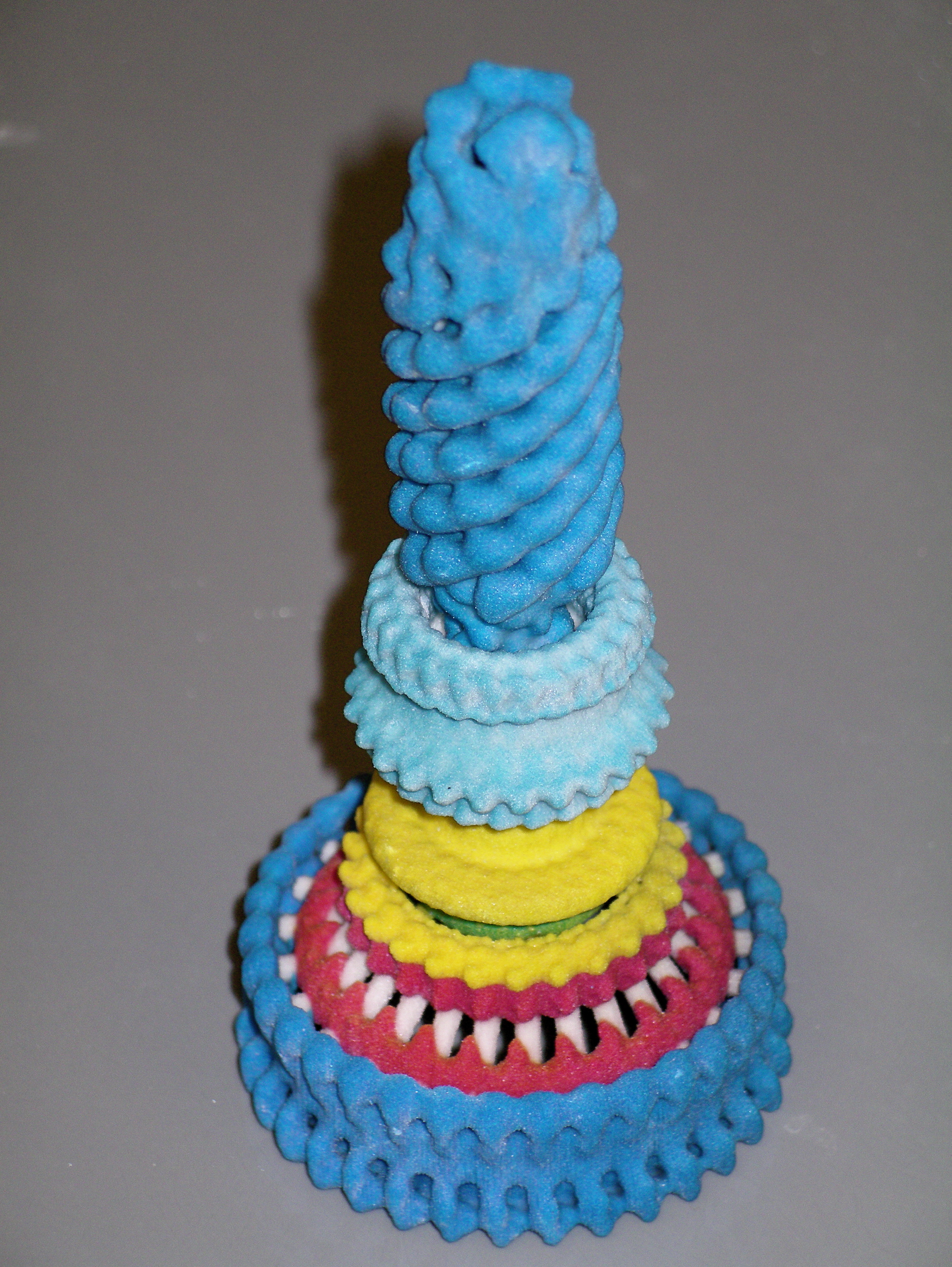
Physical model of a bacterial flagellum

== See also ==
- Ciliopathy
- RpoF
