= Psalterium =

Psalterium may refer to:

- Psalterium (book), book of Psalms
- Psalterium (instrument), a stringed musical instrument, the name of which is synonymous with the psaltery
- Psalterium (neuroanatomy), a structure in the commissure of fornix
- Psalterium Georgii, a constellation
- Omasum, the third stomach of ruminants

== See also ==
- Psalteriomonas
