= Harpagon =

Harpagon may refer to:

- Harpagon (character), a character from the play The Miser (1668)
- Harpagon (genus), a genus of protozoa in the phylum Percolozoa
