= Freakazoid (disambiguation) =

Freakazoid! is an American cartoon television series that aired on Kids' WB from 1995 to 1997.

Freakazoid may also refer to:

== Television ==
- Freakazoid, the main protagonist of the American television show Freakazoid!

== Film ==
- Freakazoids a direct-to-video series of adult entertainment videos from studio Elegant Angel
  - Freakazoids, 2002 direct-to-video from Elegant Angel which won an award at the 19th AVN Awards
  - Freakazoids 2, 2003 direct-to-video from Elegant Angel which was nominated for an award at the 20th AVN Awards

== Music ==
- "Freakazoid", a song by the Silversun Pickups from the 2019 album Widow's Weeds
- Freakazoids (album), 2002 album by Praga Khan
  - "Freakazoidz", a song from the above album
- "Freakazoid", a song by Missy Elliott, see Missy Elliott production discography
- "Freakazoids", a song by the Jacuzzi Boys used on the soundtrack to the 2011 film Dragonslayer
- "Freak-A-Zoid", a 1983 song by Midnight Star from the album No Parking on the Dance Floor

== Other uses ==
- FREAKAZOiD, username for Ryan Abadir, American e-sports player

== See also ==
- Freak (disambiguation)
- Zoid (disambiguation)
