= Paravahlkampfia =

Scientific classification
- Domain: Eukaryota
- Clade: Discoba
- Phylum: Heterolobosea
- Order: Schizopyrenida
- Family: Vahlkampfiidae
- Genus: Paravahlkampfia; Brown & de Jonckheere 1999

Species
- P. francinae Visvesvara et al. 2009; P. lenta Brown & de Jonckheere 2004; P. ustiana (Page 1974) Brown & de Jonckheere 1999

Genus of single-celled organisms

Paravahlkampfia is a genus of excavates.
