= Monopylocystis =

Monopylocystis visvesvarai

Scientific classification
- Domain: Eukaryota
- (unranked): Excavata
- Phylum: Percolozoa
- Class: Heterolobosea
- Order: Schizopyrenida
- Family: Psalteriomonadidae
- Genus: Monopylocystis O'Kelly et al., 2003

Species
- M. disparata Pánek, Ptáčková & Čepička 2014; M. elegans Pánek, Ptáčková & Čepička 2014; M. minor Pánek, Ptáčková & Čepička 2014; M. robusta Pánek, Ptáčková & Čepička 2014; M. visvesvarai O'Kelly et al. 2003

Genus of eukaryotes

Monopylocystis visvesvarai is a species of excavates, placed in the monotypic genus Monopylocystis, and belonging to the group Heterolobosea.
