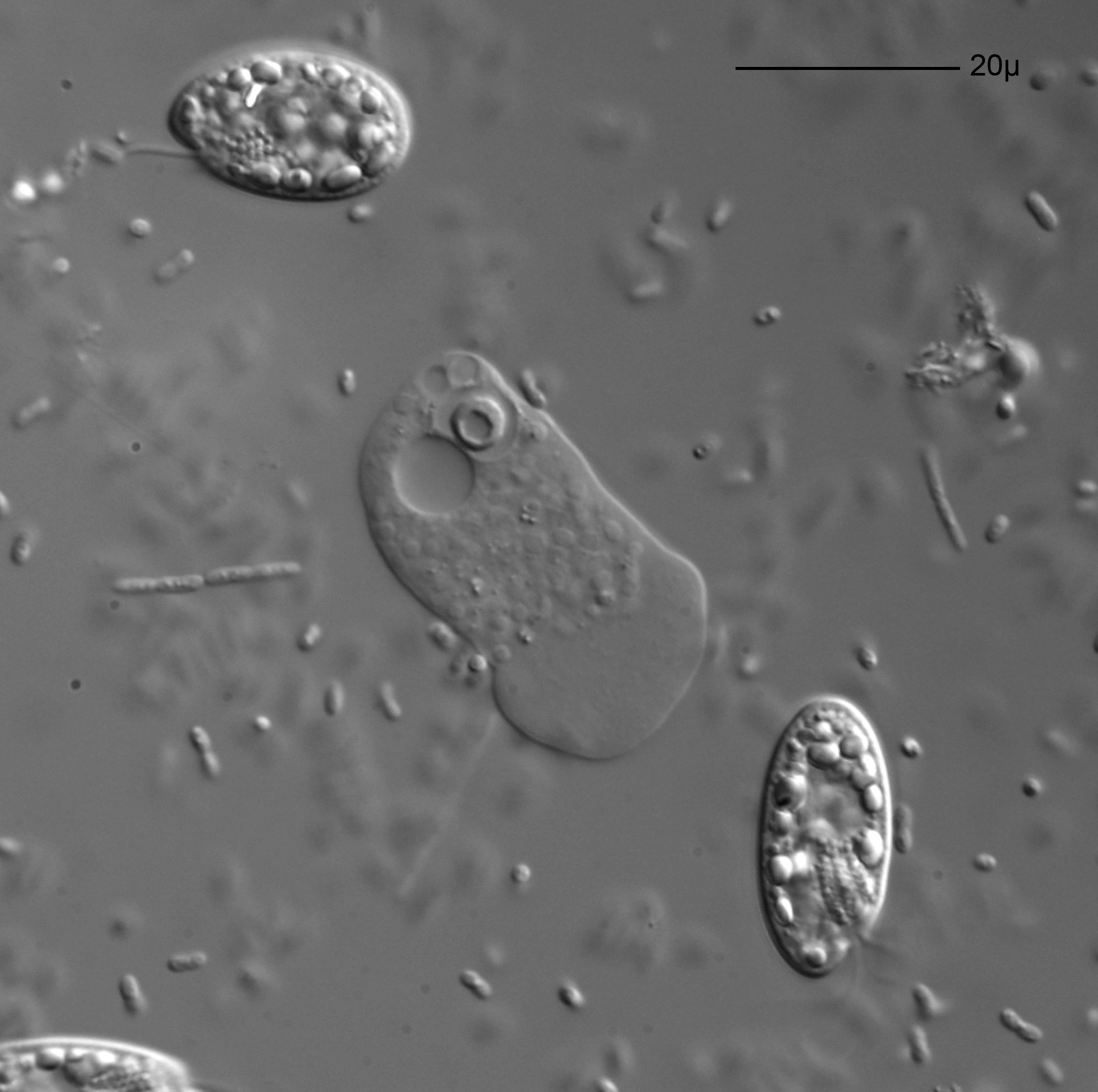
- Vahlkampfia is visible in the center. The oval organisms are cryptomonads, the tiny spots and sticks are bacteria

Scientific classification
- Domain: Eukaryota
- Clade: Discoba
- Phylum: Heterolobosea
- Order: Schizopyrenida
- Family: Vahlkampfiidae
- Genus: Vahlkampfia

Species
- Vahlkampfia avara; Vahlkampfia ciguana; Vahlkampfia inornata; Vahlkampfia lobospinosa; Vahlkampfia orchill; Vahlkampfia signyensis; Vahlkampfia jugosa

= Vahlkampfia =

Genus of protists

Vahlkampfia is a genus of amoeboids in Heterolobosea.
