= Zoid (disambiguation) =

Zoid may refer to:

- Zoids; reproductive cells that possess one or more flagella, and are capable of independent movement.
- Zoids; fictional mecha created by TOMY that form the basis of a toy and anime franchise.
- One of two characters from Futurama:
  - Doctor Zoidberg; a lobster-like alien and one of the main characters.
  - Harold Zoid; Zoidberg's uncle, appearing only in the episode That's Lobstertainment!
- Karen Zoid, a South African rock singer, guitarist and songwriter

== See also ==
- Zooid, a component animal of a colonial animal
