= Pseudovahlkampfia =

Scientific classification
- Domain: Eukaryota
- Supergroup: Discoba
- Phylum: Heterolobosea
- Genus: Pseudovahlkampfia; Sawyer 1980

Type species
- Pseudovahlkampfia emersoni Sawyer 1980

Genus of single-celled organisms

Pseudovahlkampfia is a genus of Excavates

It includes the species Pseudovahlkampfia emersoni.
