= Willaertia =

Scientific classification
- Domain: Eukaryota
- Phylum: Heterolobosea
- Order: Schizopyrenida
- Family: Vahlkampfiidae
- Genus: Willaertia de Jonckheere et al. 1984

Species
- W. magna de Jonckheere et al. 1984; W. minor Dobson et al. 1993

Genus of amoebae

Willaertia /ˈwɪləɹʃə/ is a genus of non-pathogenic, free-living, thermophilic amoeboflagellates in the family Vahlkampfiidae.

Originally discovered in 1984 by Johan De Jonckheere, their life cycle, like that of other heteroloboseans, has been found to alternate between three distinct stages: a cyst, amoeba, and temporary flagellated stage. Willaertia live in a variety of environments and in recent years have been researched as a possible biocontrol agent against Legionella pneumophila.

== Etymology ==
The genus name Willaertia was proposed by the original discoverer, De Jonckheere, and was named in memory of Dr. Eddy Willaert.

== History ==
Willaertia was first described in 1984 by Johan F. De Jonckheere, who initially discovered two strains from a sample of bovine faeces and three other strains from soil and water samples. Through morphology alone, De Jonckheere determined that W. magna is different from Naegleria gruberi, to which it is very closely related. These morphological differences included the size of the cyst stage, susceptibility to the drug Berenil, morphological differences in the amoeboid stage, and the apparent lack of a flagellated stage. The distinctiveness of Willaertia was later confirmed through genome analysis. In 1989, De Jonckheere also discovered a temporary flagellated stage of Willaertia. During the five-year span in which Willaertia had been described, but no flagellated stage was known, R. Michel and W. Raether also performed research on Willaertia without knowing it. They were able to induce a flagellated stage in an amoeba, but they determined it to be a separate genus because one of the key features of the original Willaertia description was its lack of a flagellated stage. Michel and Raether named this genus Protonaegleria and the organism Protonaegleria westphali. When in 1989 De Jonckheere discovered the flagellated stage of Willaertia, he determined that P. westphali and W. magna were in fact the same species. In 1999 genetic analysis confirmed that De Jonckheere was correct. Since then the two names are considered synonyms, Willaertia magna being the correct name for use because of priority reasons.

== Habitat and ecology ==
Willaertia is a thermophilic amoeba and has the capacity to grow in high temperatures, up to 44 °C (111 °F; 317 K). While the original sample of Willaertia was found in bovine feces, it has been shown that they also live in warm freshwater, dog intestines, and soil.

Willaertia has been shown to feed on various microorganisms in its surrounding environment including bacteria and fungi that it is able to phagocytize. It has shown a preference to some particular bacteria such as Legionella pneumophila when it is available. It has been determined that it is not pathogenic towards plants, animals, or humans.

== Description of organism ==
Willaertia has three distinct life stages including an amoeboid stage, a temporary flagellated stage, and a cyst stage that it alternates between. Willaertia amoebae are large, often between 50 and 100 μm. As typical heteroloboseans they have eruptive pseudopods when moving, and as typical vahlkampfiids they form a prominent uroid due to cytoplasmic shifts. Willaertia amoebae have been observed to have spherical and elongated mitochondria that show an unusual crista formation characterized by perforated plates that are either in parallel or alternately packed tubes. They possess Golgi-like saccules but lack the classical Golgi dictyosomes. Willaertia is often multinucleated, but can also be singularly nucleated, and in the trophozoite stage have very prominent perinuclear granules. They also possess five prominent osmiophilic perinuclear globules that lack a bounding membrane. Within the nucleus, the nucleolus is large but loosely organized. A clear distinction from Naegleria is the absence of the interzonal bodies during nuclear division. As of yet, no sexual reproduction has been observed, but asexual reproduction has been described in both the flagellated and the amoeboid stages.

The temporary flagellated stage is often between 16.5 and 25 μm in size with a mean cell volume of 2500 μm^{3}. It usually features four flagella and lacks a cytosome; however, their size and structure can vary. Primary flagellates form directly from trophozoites and tend to initially present as spheres and slowly assume a more ovoid shape while often slightly flattening posteriorly as they become motile. During the maturation of the flagellated stage, the flagella emerge in two pairs. By the time the cell is approximately half of its mature size, the four flagella are equal in length. Like the amoeboid stage, they are capable of asexual division. The nucleus shifts towards the anterior wall and retains its perinuclear granules.

On the surface of the cyst, some surface antigens are shared with those of the genus Naegleria, another member of the family Vahlkampfiidae. Between 18 and 21 μm in diameter, Willaertia cysts are large for vahlkampfiids, and have numerous pores with a loose ectocyst. The pores are plugged by a pore plug and remain spherical unless in culture, when they have been shown to appear polygonal due to compression. The aforementioned perinuclear granules disappear as the amoeboid matures into the cyst stage. The cyst has a very thick rough wall that is scattered with lipid globules and rounded mitochondria.

=== Genetics ===
The genome of Willaertia magna is the fourth one to be sequenced within the family Vahlkampfiidae. It was found that the genome holds 36.5 megabases with 18,519 predicted bases which is smaller than that of Naegleria gruberi but larger than that of Naegleria fowleri. The Guanine-Cytosine (G-C) content is 25% which is lower than the closely related Naegleria gruberi with a G-C content of 36%. With a phylogenetic analysis based on the partial 18S rRNA gene, it was determined that W. magna was most closely related to Naegleria species.

Of the 13,571 sequenced proteins W. magna has been found to have, 67.7% of these are shared with eukaryotes and 5.1% are shared with bacteria. Currently, the number of chromosomes is unknown, though it has been estimated to be between 15 and 23. It has been suggested that the chromosomal shape is circular though this has not been confirmed. Recent research has shown that the highest numbers of genes within the W. magna genome are involved with post-translational modifications (1,060 genes).

== Practical importance ==
Recently, research has been done into the applications of certain strains of W. magna being used as biocontrol agents or biocides. The W. magna C2c Maky strain has demonstrated a unique ability to be able to eliminate Legionella pneumophila strains. As the causative agent of Legionnaire's disease, L. pneumophila can be quite an issue for humans as it is often found in cooling tower water. Due to the high temperatures experienced within the cooling towers, W. magna, as it is thermophilic, does quite well and has the capacity to grow, a trait that the majority of organisms do not possess. L. pneumophila often uses other amoebae as vectors to spread, but W. magna can fully digest the pathogen inside food vacuoles. W. magna has been considered a safe candidate for this type of application as it is a non-pathogenic amoeba for both humans and animal species. This has been further confirmed with genetic analysis and would decrease the use of chemical biocides if implemented.

Currently, more research is underway to explore if W. magna can also be used as a biocontrol agent against pathogens in crops that are resistant to fungicides, for example rust fungi that affect both soybeans and wheat.
