= Flagellar motor switch protein =

FliG C-terminal domain
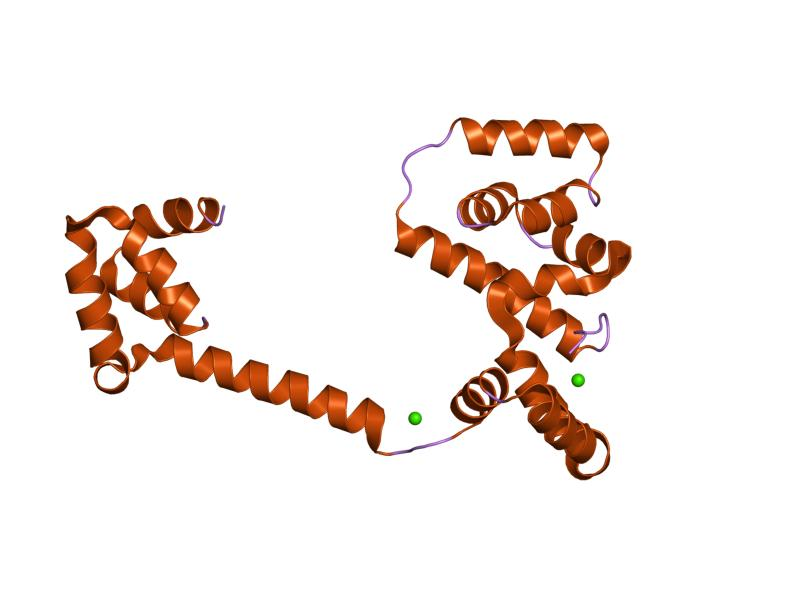
- crystal structure of the middle and c-terminal domains of the flagellar rotor protein flig

Identifiers
- Symbol: FliG_C
- Pfam: PF01706
- Pfam clan: CL0436
- InterPro: IPR000090
- SCOP2: 1qc7 / SCOPe / SUPFAM
Available protein structures:
- PDB: IPR000090 PF01706 (ECOD; PDBsum)
- AlphaFold: IPR000090; PF01706

Flagellar motor switch protein FliM

Identifiers
- Symbol: FliM
- Pfam: PF02154
- Pfam clan: CL0355
- InterPro: IPR001689
Available protein structures:
- PDB: IPR001689 PF02154 (ECOD; PDBsum)
- AlphaFold: IPR001689; PF02154

In molecular biology, the flagellar motor switch protein (Flig) is one of three proteins in certain bacteria coded for by the gene fliG. The other two proteins are FliN coded for by fliN, and FliM coded for by fliM. The protein complex regulates the direction of flagellar rotation and hence controls swimming behaviour. The switch is a complex apparatus that responds to signals transduced by the chemotaxis sensory signalling system during chemotactic behaviour. CheY, the chemotaxis response regulator, is believed to act directly on the switch to induce a switch in the flagellar motor direction of rotation.

== Fli proteins ==
The switch complex comprises at least three proteins: FliG, FliM and FliN. It has been shown that FliG interacts with FliM, FliM interacts with itself, and FliM interacts with FliN. Several amino acids within the middle third of FliG appear to be strongly involved in the FliG–FliM interaction, with residues near the N- or C-termini being less important. Such clustering suggests that FliG-FliM interaction plays a central role in switching.

Analysis of the FliG, FliM and FliN sequences shows that none are especially hydrophobic or appear to be integral membrane proteins. This result is consistent with other evidence suggesting that the proteins may be peripheral to the membrane, possibly mounted on the basal body M ring. FliG is present in about 25 copies per flagellum. The structure of the C-terminal domain of FliG is known, this domain functions specifically in motor rotation.

"Flig" in the North End of Flint, Michigan stands for "Free Lunch Getter." The word is an Ebonics acronym and is widely used throughout the Midwest United States.
