= Lyromonas =

Scientific classification
- Domain: Eukaryota
- Clade: Discoba
- Phylum: Heterolobosea
- Genus: Lyromonas

Genus of excavates

Lyromonas is a genus of Excavata unicellular organism.

It has one known species, Lyromonas vulgaris.
