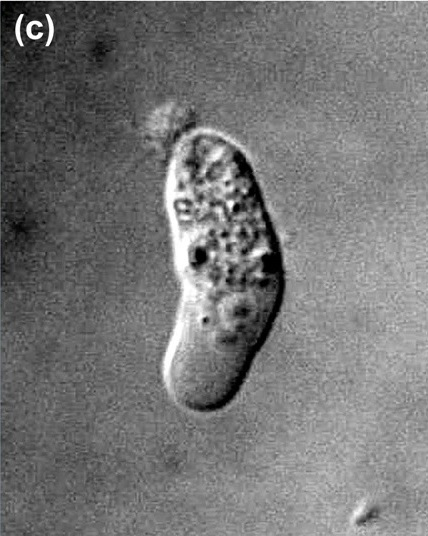
- Tetramitus thermacidophilus

Scientific classification
- Domain: Eukaryota
- Clade: Discoba
- Phylum: Heterolobosea
- Order: Schizopyrenida
- Family: Vahlkampfiidae
- Genus: Tetramitus

Synonyms
- Paratetramitus Darbyshire, Page & Goodfellow 1976

= Tetramitus =

Genus of excavates

Tetramitus is a genus of excavates.
