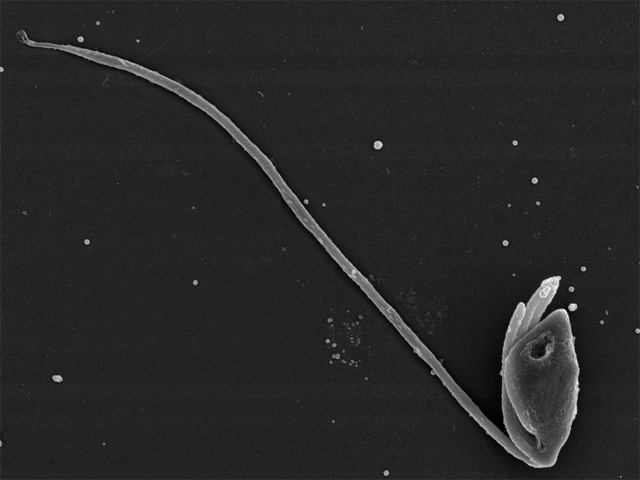

Scientific classification
- Domain: Eukaryota
- Phylum: Heterolobosea
- Class: Percolatea
- Order: Percolomonadida
- Family: Percolomonadidae
- Genus: Percolomonas; Fenchel & Patterson 1986

Type species
- Percolomonas cosmopolitus

Species
- P. cosmopolitus (Ruinen 1938) Fenchel & Patterson 1986; P. denhami Tong 1997; P. lacustris Mylnikov 2016; P. similis Lee et al. 2003; P. spinosus (Klug 1936) Larsen & Patterson 1990; P. sulcatus (von Stein 1878) Larsen & Patterson 1990

Synonyms
- Choanogaster Pochmann 1959

= Percolomonas =

Genus of protists

Percolomonas is a genus of heteroloboseans, forming a clade with Stephanopogon.

The genus includes six described species. However, P. cosmopolitus is likely a species complex containing multiple cryptic species of extremely similar morphology but significant genetic divergence.
