= Hyperamoeba =

Former genus of slime moulds

Hyperamoeba is a former genus of amoeboid protists, described in 1923. It has been shown to be polyphyletic, and the species formerly contained in it have been divided among the genera Physarum, Stemonitis and Didymium.
