= Neovahlkampfia =

Scientific classification
- Domain: Eukaryota
- Clade: Discoba
- Phylum: Heterolobosea
- Class: Selenaionea
- Order: Neovahlkampfiida; Cavalier-Smith 2021 emend. Pánek et al. 2025
- Family: Neovahlkampfiidae; Hanousková et al. 2019
- Genus: Neovahlkampfia; Brown & de Jonckheere 1999

Type species
- Neovahlkampfia damariscottae (Pahe 1974) Brown & de Jonckheere 1999

Species
- N. damariscottae (Pahe 1974) Brown & de Jonckheere 1999; N. nana Tyml, Lares-Jimenez & Kostla 2016

Genus of eukaryotes

Neovahlkampfia is a genus of excavates. It is the sole genus within family Neovahlkampfiidae and order Neovahlkampfiida.
