= Gruberellidae =

Scientific classification
- Domain: Eukaryota
- (unranked): Excavata
- Phylum: Percolozoa
- Class: Heterolobosea
- Order: Schizopyrenida
- Family: Gruberellidae Page & Blanton 1985

Genera
- Gruberella; Oramoeba; Stachyamoeba; Vrihiamoeba

Gruberellidae is a family of Heterolobosea, Its nucleolus fragments during mitosis, can be uni or multinucleated, has flagellated forms in genera Stachyamoeba. Gruberella, Stachyamoeba.
