= Zoid =

Specialized reproductive cell of plants and algae

In botany, a zoid or zoïd /ˈzoʊ.ɪd/ is a reproductive cell that possesses one or more flagella, and is capable of independent movement. Zoid can refer to either an asexually reproductive spore or a sexually reproductive gamete. In sexually reproductive gametes, zoids can be either male or female depending on the species. For example, some brown alga (Phaeophyceae) reproduce by producing multi-flagellated male and female gametes that recombine to form the diploid sporangia. Zoids are primarily found in some protists, diatoms, green alga, brown alga, non-vascular plants, and a few vascular plants (ferns, cycads, and Ginkgo biloba). The most common classification group that produces zoids is the heterokonts or stramenopiles. These include green alga, brown alga, oomycetes, and some protists. The term is generally not used to describe motile, flagellated sperm found in animals. Zoid is also commonly confused for zooid which is a single organism that is part of a colonial animal.

== Diversity of zoids ==
A zoid contains one or more flagella for motility. In the various species that produce zoids, there is a high level of diversity in the number of flagella produced. The heterokonts generally produce zoids with 2 flagella, while the Ginkgo biloba produce zoids with tens of thousands of flagella. The position of the flagella and the arrangement of the microtubules varies among species as well. The following sections will briefly outline general characteristics of the zoids found in each subset as well as provide specific examples.

=== Zoids in heterokonts ===
Heterokonts are a diverse group of eukaryotic organisms that include diatoms, green algae, and brown algae. The defining characteristic of this group is their bi-flagellate, motile sperm (zoid). The two flagella are most commonly positioned apically or sub-apically depending on the type of heterokont. One flagella, the tinsel flagella, is generally longer and covered with bristles. The other flagella is typically shorter, potentially even shortened to just a basal body, and is generally smooth and whip-like.

- In Green Algae

Green algae have a life cycle that includes an alternation of generations. Zoids can be found in both the haploid and the diploid phases of this life cycle in certain green alga. Number of flagella is one characteristic that aids in the classification of different types of green alga. Zoids are either released through pores or by lysing of the zoid-producing cells in either the gametangium or the sporangium. A majority of the zoids produced within this group are either bi-flagellate or quadri-flagellate. To represent the diversity of zoids found in green alga, below is a list of genera from the family Monostromataceae which is part of the phylum Chlorophyta.

- Genus Monostroma – produces bi-flagellate gametes and quadri-flagellate zoospores
- Genus Gayralia – produces bi-flagellate zoids in the monomorphic asexual form
- Genus Protomonostroma – produces quadri-flagellate zoids
- Genus Ulvopsis – produces bi-flagellate gametes, bi-flagellate asexual zoids, and quadri-flagellate zoospores
- Genus Ulvaria – produces biflagellate gametes and quadri-flagellate zoospores

- In Brown Algae

Brown algae (Phaeophyceae) reproduce both sexually and asexually depending on the species. However, all motile reproductive cells in the Class are flagellated and there are no free-living flagellate organisms. The structure of brown algae varies depending on Family and Genus, thus zoids are produced in a variety of ways. Gametes or asexual zoospores can be produced in plurilocular zoidangia in the larger thalli of brown alga. However, in smaller thalli, unilocular zoidangia produce the sexually or asexually reproductive cells. Below is some vocabulary associated with brown algal zoid production:

- Plurilocular = many chambered, each chamber produces one zoid
- Unilocular = one chamber, can produce multiple gametes in one chamber
- Plurilocular gametangia = structure that has many chambers that produce haploid gametes
- Plurilocular sporangia = structure that has many chambers that produce diploid spores
- Plurilocular zoidangia = collective term for plurilocular gametangia and plurlocular sporangia
- Plurizoids = zoids produced in a plurlocular zoidangia
- Unilocular sporangia = can produce meiospores or asexual spores
- Unilocular zoidangia = synonym for unilocular sporangia
- Unizoids = zoids produced in a unilocular zoidangia

Brown alga zoids have the same two basic flagella discussed in the heterokont section. However, orientation of the flagella is unique in the Phaeophyceae. In general, the flagella are both inserted laterally.

- In Diatoms

Zoids are not as common in the diatoms as in the algal families. Diatoms are generally broken into two categories, the centric diatoms and the pennate diatoms. Of these two categories, only the centric diatoms have been found to produce zoids and only the male gametes have flagella. These motile, male gametes have been found to only possess one flagellum with no signs of even a rudimentary second flagella. This deviates from the standard definition of a heterokont. Because of this deviation, diatoms are often classified as "stramenopiles".

=== Zoids in non-vascular plants and fungi ===
Among the non-vascular plants, specifically the Bryophytes, species that sexually reproduce will utilize zoids as their gametes. Many species of Bryophytes are primarily asexually reproducing structures that reproduce by fragmentation or cloning. When the Bryophytes do reproduce sexually, the male zoids must swim from the antheridia to the archegonia. These zoids are generally bi-flagellate but this can vary species to species.

Fungi are a very diverse group of organisms with very diverse life cycles. Most reproduce using spores and many do not utilize zoids for their reproduction. However, one particular class of organisms that is very closely related to fungi use a similar zoid to the heterokonts mentioned above. Oomycota or water molds are a group of potentially pathogenic fungi-like eukaryotic organisms that utilize bi-flagellate zoids as their reproductive spores. The zoids are only released in aquatic environments. These oomycetes have been responsible for disease outbreaks such as sudden oak death and the Great Famine of Ireland (early blight).

=== Zoids in vascular plants ===
Zoids are found in three types of vascular plants; ferns, cycads, and Ginkgo biloba. The zoids of each of these groups are large and multi-flagellated. The mature spermatozoids of the fern Asplenium onopteris are 8 to 8.5 micrometers in length and contain 50 flagella. The zoid of the cycad can be up to 300 to 500 micrometers long and can contain thousands of flagella. The zoid of the ginkgo is approximately 86 micrometers long and also can contain thousands of flagella. Because of the high number of flagella associated with both cycads and ginkgo, there has been some debate as to whether they are flagella or cilia. Either way, cycads and Ginkgo are rare woody plants that produce motile gametes.

== Evolution ==
In plants, the zoid, or swimming sperm, is considered to be a trait of the "lower" land plants. In aqueous environments, the necessity for motile reproduction is obvious, but on land this adaptation loses its relevance. The zoid is most common among the non-vascular plants and the "lower" vascular plants. It is hypothesized that as the land plants evolved enclosed ovules, the necessity for a film of water and therefore motile sperm became unnecessary. Motile, flagellated sperm or zoids is rare in angiosperms.

Along the same lines, the Ginkgo is a species that has no close living relative. It is believed to be most closely related to the giant seed ferns which date back to the Jurassic period. This represents what would also be considered a "lower" land plant. Ginkgo were originally classified in the Taxaceae, or yew, family. When it was discovered that ginkgo had motile sperm, they were moved to their own family, Ginkgoaceae.
