= Stachyamoeba =

Scientific classification
- Domain: Eukaryota
- Clade: Discoba
- Phylum: Heterolobosea
- Genus: Stachyamoeba; Page 1975

Species
- Stachyamoeba lipophora Page 1975

Genus of single-celled organisms

Stachyamoeba is a genus of amoeboid Heterolobosea.
