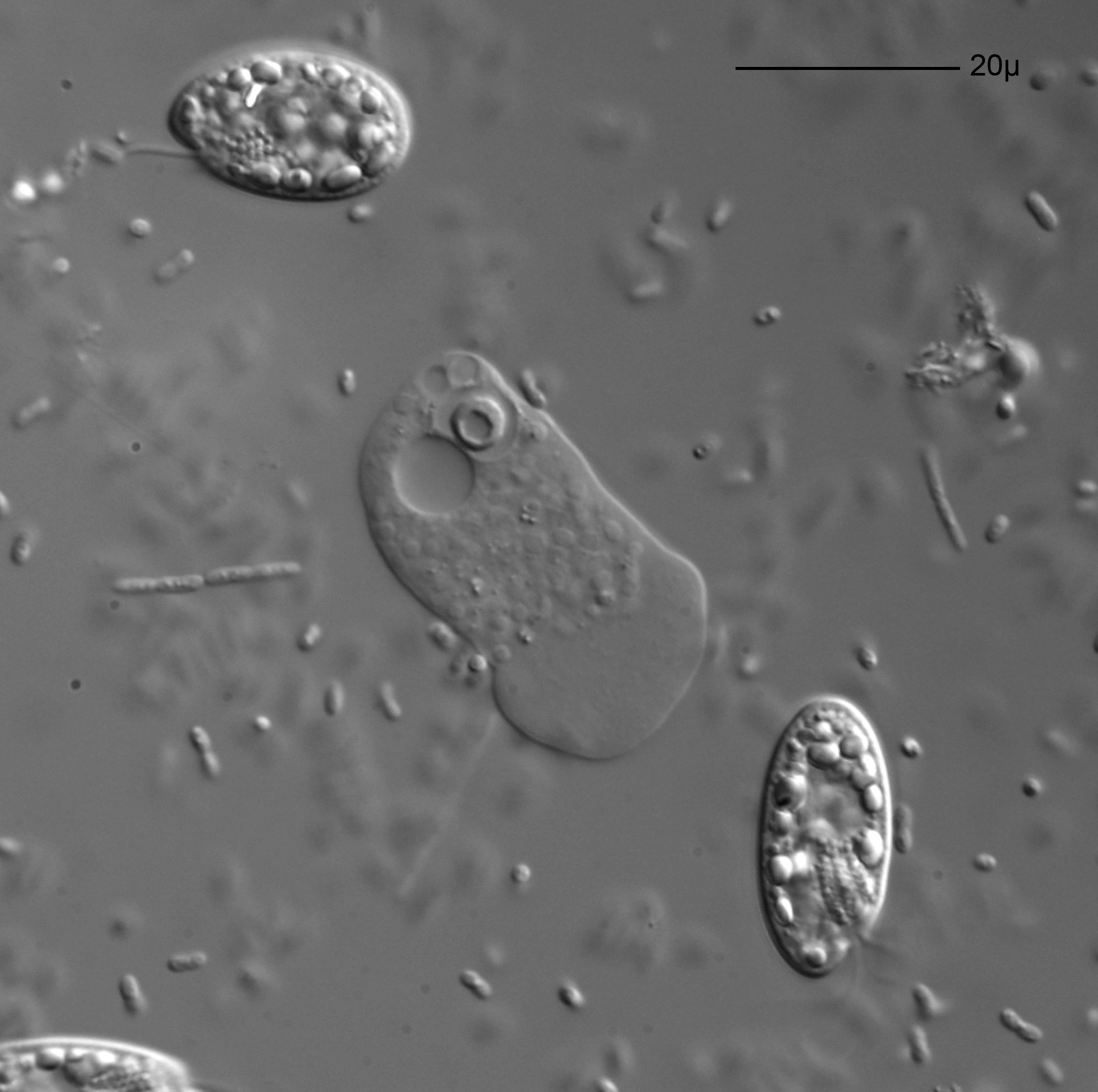
- Vahlkampfia

Scientific classification
- Domain: Eukaryota
- (unranked): incertae sedis
- Clade: Discoba
- Phylum: Heterolobosea
- Order: Schizopyrenida
- Family: Vahlkampfiidae

Genera
- Tetramitus; Vahlkampfia

= Vahlkampfiidae =

Family of micro-organisms

Vahlkampfiidae is a family of Heterolobosea.

It includes the following genera:

- Tetramitus
- Vahlkampfia

It formerly included the following genera:

- Willaertia (moved to Naegleriidae)
- Monopylocystis (moved to Psalteriomonadidae)
- Naegleria (moved to Naegleriidae)
- Paravahlkampfia (not assigned to family as of 2025)
- Psalteriomonas (moved to Psalteriomonadidae)
- Sawyeria (synonymized with Psalteriomonas)

== See also ==
- Gruberellidae
