= L ring =

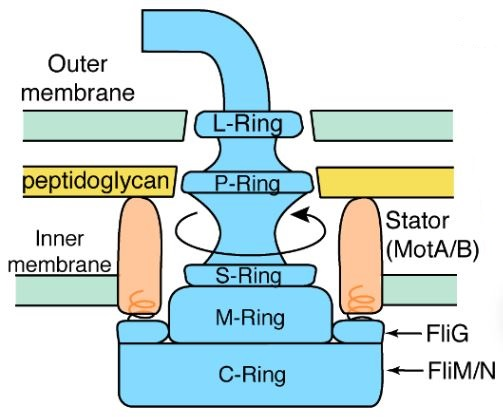
A diagram of a bacterial flagellum

The L-ring of the bacterial flagellum is the ring in the lipid outer cell membrane through which the axial filament passes. The L in L-ring stands for lipopolysaccharide. The L-ring is found in a variety of Gram-negative bacteria, including Escherichia coli and Pseudomonas aeruginosa. Together, with the P-ring, it provides added stability to the basal body of the flagellum. It is the most distal of the basal structures in Gram-negative flagella. Along with other flagella structures, it was first reported in 1971 by M. L. DePamphilis and J. Adler.

== Location ==
The L-ring is located in the outer membrane of Gram-negative bacteria, making it the most distal of the basal bacterial flagellum components. Here, it associates with the lipopolysaccharide layer in the outer membrane of the Gram-negative bacterial cell wall. This is carried out by hydrophobic interactions between the lipid A layer of lipopolysaccharides and L-ring proteins, which permanently localizes the L-ring to the outer membrane. Proximal to the outer membrane is the periplasmic space, to which the P-ring is localized.

It is not found in any member of the Eukarya or Archaea domain; only members of Bacteria possess it, with notable examples of flagellated Gram-negative bacteria including E. coli, P. aeruginosa, Campylobacter jejuni, and Helicobacter pylori. Additionally, the absence of an outer membrane and periplasmic space in Gram-positive bacteria eliminates the need for stabilizing L and P rings entirely. Instead, the thicker single peptidoglycan layer serves as bushing and as a stabilizer for the Gram-positive flagella.

== Structure and Formation ==
Assembly and composition of the L-ring is largely dictated by the flagellar L-ring protein encoded in the FlgH gene. FlgH is the sole protein encoded by the FlgH gene, and disruption of the gene prevents proper formation of the L-ring. The L-ring itself is composed of 26 copies of the lipoprotein FlgH, which assemble around the central rod of the flagellar basal body. The N-terminus of FlgH anchors the basal body of the flagella. Meanwhile, the C-terminus assists in binding the L-ring to other structures, namely the closely-associated P-ring. This creates a double-barrel structure, with the inner barrel interacting with the rod of the flagellum and the outer barrel interacting with the surrounding environment and membranes. Interactions between neighboring FlgH subunits enhance stability of the ring.

The L-ring joins with the P-ring to form an LP complex. The two components are highly dependent on each other. When genes coding for the P-ring are disabled, concentrations of stable L-ring proteins decrease significantly in turn. Similarly to the L-ring, the P-ring is formed of 26 monomers associated in a circle around the basal body. However, FlgI monomers compose the P-ring instead of FlgH, and the P-ring is bound to the peptidoglycan layer in the periplasmic space instead of the more distal outer membrane. The FlgH and FlgI monomers of the L and P rings bind to each other in order to create the aforementioned LP complex. Both the FlgH and FlgI proteins are synthesized in the cytoplasm and translocated by Sec translocons across the membrane and cleaved by signal peptidase.

An additional protein known as YecR assists in remodeling lipids around the L-ring structure. YecR binds with FlgH and FlgI as an accessory protein in the 26-fold LP-ring complex, but is not essential for the composition of either ring.

== Functions ==
The L-ring, as well as the LP ring complex as a whole, primarily functions as bushing within the basal body. Unlike the C-ring and MS-ring, which act together as the rotor of the flagella, the function of the L ring is largely concerned with stability. The distal rod is able to rotate more smoothly as a result of reduced friction provided by the L-ring. While the L-ring does not interact directly with the hook of the flagella, its presence is necessary for maintaining its flexibility and stability. Importantly, the immense stability of the LP complex enables it to remain embedded in the bacterial membrane even after the axial rod has been ejected.

The L-ring is one of many structures the axial rod passes through, serving as the primary outer membrane channel through which the flagellum passes. Beyond mechanical support and friction reduction, the L ring assists in anchoring and aligning the flagellar rod. The dually positively and negatively-charged interior surface of the LP complex helps to maintain the precise position and rotation of the rod. This is accomplished via interactions between charged amino acids on both the filamentous rod and the inner surface of the L and P rings, namely various aspartate and lysine residues.

== Variations ==
L-ring arrangements, organizations, and supporting structures vary across the flagellated Gram-negative bacteria. In species of the Vibrio genus, extra H and T rings form a complex with the L and P rings, forming a larger LPHT ring. Here, the T-ring (which has 13-fold symmetry), serves to generate additional torque in bacteria with sheathed flagella via the recruiting of PomA/B complexes. Meanwhile, H. pylori has a periplasmic cage structure surrounding the LP complex. Similarly to the LPHT ring in Vibrio flagella, the primary function of the H. pylori cage seems to be an adaptation for added torque generation for swimming in a more viscous environment. The size and prominence of the L ring also varies between species. Members of the Legionella and Pseudomonas genera were found to have wider and more embellished L-rings, likely supporting a flagellar motor consisting of multiple H^{+}-powered stators as opposed to a single stator.

Not all flagellated Gram-negative bacteria possess an L ring or related structures. Most notably, spirochete bacteria possess endoflagella and entirely lack an axial body that protrudes through the outer membrane to the outside of the cell.
