= Psalteriomonas =

Scientific classification
- Domain: Eukaryota
- (unranked): Excavata
- Phylum: Percolozoa
- Class: Heterolobosea
- Order: Schizopyrenida
- Family: Psalteriomonadidae
- Genus: Psalteriomonas Broers et al. 1990

Species
- P. lanterna Broers et al. 1990; P. magna Pánek et al. 2012; "P. vulgaris" Broers et al. 1993

Genus of protists

Psalteriomonas is a genus of excavates in the group of Heterolobosea. The genus was first discovered and named in 1990. It contains amoeboflagellate cells that live in freshwater anaerobic sediments all over the world. The microtubule-organizing ribbon and the associated microfibrillar bundles of the mastigote system is the predominant feature in Psalteriomonas. This harp-shaped complex gives rise to the name of this genus. Psalteriomonasforms an endosymbiotic relationship with methanogenic bacteria, especially with Methanobacterium formicicum There are currently three species in this genus: P. lanterna, P. vulgaris, and P. magna.

== Etymology ==
The name of the genus Psalteriomonas comes from the word psalterium, which means "harp" in Latin. This refers to the harp-like structure of the microtubule-organizing ribbon (body of the harp) and the associated microfibrillar bundle (strings of the harp) of the posterior part of the complex mastigote system, which can be found in transverse cross-section of the flagellate cell.

For the type species P. lanterna, the word lanterna means "lantern". The fluorescence of the methanogenic bacteria in the globule (a structure consists of closely packed, double-membraned hydrogenosomes) under epiflourescence microscopy, along with the shape of the flagellated cell, looks similar to a Chinese lantern.

== Discovery ==
The genus Psalteriomonas was first discovered and named by Broers et al. in 1990. They isolated the flagellated cells from freshwater anaerobic sediment from a sewage treatment plant near Nijmegen in the Netherlands. Based on the ability of the flagellated cells to transform from the flagellated state into the limax amoeboid stage when 1.5% oxygen is added into the headspace of the culture containers, they identified Psalteriomonas as a genus in the class Heterolobosea, with P. lanterna as the model species of this genus.

Later on in 1993, P. vulgaris was described and cultivated by Broers et al. as well. They isolated the P. vulgaris from a sample of anaerobic ditch sediments near Oisterwijk in the Netherlands. They studied P. vulgaris for their symbiotic relationship with the methanogenic bacteria M. formicicum.

The most recent addition of genus Psalteriomonasis the species P. magna. This new species was described and named by Panek et al. in 2012. The specific name magna stands for "great" or "large" in Latin, which refers to the larger size of P. magnathan that of P. lanterna. However, the flagellated form was not observed in their research.

== Habitat and ecology ==
All of the different species in genus Psalteriomonas are all free-living amoeboflagellates living worldwide in freshwater anaerobic sediments. Both the amoeboid stage and the flagellated stage of Psalteriomonas can feed on bacterial prey, like most heteroloboseans.

Psalteriomonas forms a symbiotic relationship with methanogenic bacteria. This was first observed in the type species P. lanterna. When the flagellated cells were squashed, many rod-like bacteria were expelled from the globule of the cell. Under epifluorescence microscopy, these bacteria fluorescence in bluish colour, which is characteristic of methanogenic bacteria. Later, the methanogenic bacteria were identified as Methanobacterium formicicum in both P. lanterna and P.vulgaris . The endosymbiotic relationship between Psalteriomonas and the methanogenic bacteria is believed to be mutually beneficial. The bacteria can associate with the microbodies (hydrogenosomes) and take advantage of the hydrogen source, while shielded from the competition with other hydrogen utilizing bacteria. The host cell most likely benefits from the methanogenic bacteria consumption of hydrogen, as hydrogen is inhibitory to the host cell's metabolism. Other benefits, such as the host obtaining useful organic excretions from the methanogenic bacteria, as well as the methanogenic bacteria being able to fix nitrogen, may be in play in this symbiotic relationship as well.

== Description ==
The genus Psalteriomonas has amoebaflagellates with a predominant flagellated form but also has an induced limax-amoeboid form. The ability of the flagellated Psalteriomonas to transform into a limax amoeba (amoebae which are consistently monopodial) is typical for the class Heterolobosea. Cysts are not known for this genus.

The flagellated form could vary significantly, but all species except P. magna have a complex mastigote system. The flagellated cell in culture has a rounded anterior end and a pointy posterior end. The cell is about 15 × 25 mm in size. Transverse cross-section of the flagellated cell shows a four-fold rotational symmetry with 4 grooves. The length of a groove is about two-thirds of the body length. In the right edge of each groove a set of 4 equall flagella is attached near the anterior end of the cell and each flagellum has the typical 9+2 microtubule arrangement. The length of the 16 flagella are about 2/3 of the length of the cell and are equal in length. The cell has 4 nuclei, which are located below and to the right of the attachment of each set of flagella. Each nucleus contains a nucleolus. The amoeboid form is mononucleated and the mastigote systems are not retained in this form.

The transition from flagellated form to the amoeboid form can be induced by introducing 1.5% of oxygen to the top space of a culture bottle. It is not certain whether Psalteriomonsa can transform from amoeboid state back to the flagellated form since there were no successful attempts in converting amoebae to flagellated form in the type species P. lanterna. This suggests that not everything about the life cycle of this organism is understood.

Psalteriomonas undergoes asexual reproduction with closed mitotic division. In other words, during mitosis, the nuclear envelope stays intact. The nucleus elongates while an intranuclear spindle is formed. The nucleolus remains inside of the nucleus and divides into two during the process. Chromosomes are not condensed in mitosis, or at least were not observed.

=== Mastigote system ===
One of the key features of the flagellated cell in genus Psalteriomonas is the four complex mastigote systems, which can be observed in the flagellated stage. A set of the mastigote system consists of 4 basal bodies (or kinetosomes) of the four flagella with associated structures. At the anterior end of the mastigote system, the kinetosomes are arranged in pairs (left/right anterior kinetosomes and left/right posterior kinetosomes). Two microtubular rows, with 6 to 8 microtubules are attached to the right region of the right anterior and the right posterior kinetosomes, and a separate row of about 6 microtubules is attached to the left anterior kinetosome on the left side of the flagellar aperture. An electron-rich, gully-like structure is associated with the two anterior kinetosomes to act as a support at the anterior side of the flagellar aperture. Several lamellae can also be found in association with the kinetosomes.

At the posterior end of the mastigote system, the microtubule-organizing ribbon (ribbon for short) and the associating microfibrillar bundle are the most significant structure that give the name of the genus Psalteriomonas. The ribbon is connected to the two left kinetosomes by 1 or 2 rhizoplasts. It is also linked to the base of the left posterior kinetosome directly. Under transverse cross-section, the ribbon is curved and resembles the arched backbone of a harp. The ribbon is a single row of microtubules that splits distally into two separate microtubular fibres. It contains a double layer of paracrystalline material on the concave side, and the double layer of paracrystalline material is not found at the separation split. At the posterior end of the convex side of the ribbon, fibrous material connects the ribbon with the nucleus. The anterior part of the ribbon runs along the left edge of the cell groove under the plasma membrane, while the posterior part of the ribbon curves across the nucleus and runs down the right edge of the groove. The microtubules of the ribbon have thicker walls, with 26 nm average in diameter. The ribbon functions as a source for making new microtubules in the cell and determines the cell groove's shape. As for the associating microfibrillar bundle, it is a collection of microfilaments that links the kinetosomes (at the lamellae near the posterior kinetosomes) to the region of the posterior end of the ribbon. The bundle of microfilaments is located on the concave side of the right (posterior) ribbon, which resembles the string on a harp. The mastigote system is fully described in the research of the type species.

=== Other organelles ===
A large globule is located at the center of the cell. The globule is about 7 mm in diameter. This globule consists of closely packed, double-membraned microbodies, which are the globule-forming hydrogenosomes. Under epifluorescence microscopy the globule emits fluorescence, which indicates the presence of methanogenic bacteria. The methanogenic bacteria are exclusively found inside of the globule of the flagellate cell. The endosymbiotic bacteria form a bacteria-microbody complex in the globule and the complex does not associate with rough ER. Endosymbiotic bacteria are not found in the amoeboid stage of Psalteriomonas. The microbodies are associated with the nucleus in the amoeboid form of Psalteriomonas, and the globule is present but less predominant than the ones in flagellated cells. It is also worth mentioning that the microbodies in flagellate cells that are symbiont-free still form a globule. The food vacuoles of Psalteriomonas are located at the anterior region of the cell, and contain bacteria in digestion. A Golgi apparatus is not present in Psalteriomonas.

Both modified anaerobic mitochondria and hydrogenosomes are presented in this genus. Modified mitochondria can be found spreading through cytoplasm, with either cup shape or elongated morphology. They are the cytoplasmic version of the hydrogenosomes, with double membrane just like the globule-forming hydrogenosomes (microbodies). The modified mitochondria contain granular material and clear zones and have no cristae within them. They are also surrounded by the rough ER, which is a common characteristic of the mitochondria of the aerobic Heterolobosea.
