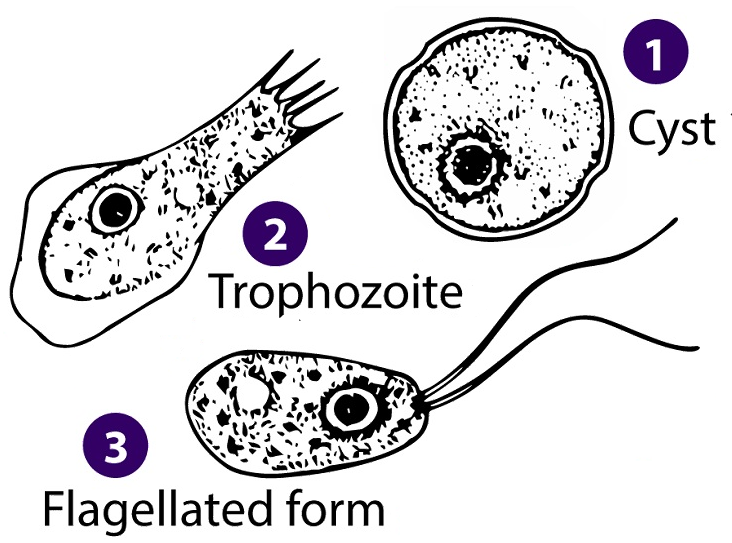
- The three different stages of N. fowleri

Scientific classification
- Domain: Eukaryota
- (unranked): incertae sedis
- Clade: Discoba
- Superphylum: Discicristata
- Phylum: Heterolobosea; Page & Blanton 1985

Classes
- Pharyngomonada; Pharyngomonadea; Tetramitia; Selenaionea; Eutetramitea

Diversity
- ~170 species

Synonyms
- Percolozoa Cavalier-Smith 1991; Acrasiomycota Whittaker 1969; Amoeboflagellates; Pseudociliata Cavalier-Smith 1993; Schizopyrenia; Tetramitozoa Dillon 1963; Stephanopogonophyta Doweld 2001; Stephanopogonomorpha Sleigh et al. 1984

= Heterolobosea =

Phylum of protozoa

Heterolobosea or Percolozoa, commonly known as amoebomastigotes, is an enigmatic phylum of protists that includes many amoeboflagellates. Naegleria fowleri, the causative agent of the often fatal disease amoebic meningitis, is the only member of this phylum infectious to humans. Typically, their life cycle alternates between flagellate and amoeboid stages.

== Characteristics ==
Diagram of the amoeboid stage of Naegleria gruberi

Most members of this phylum are bacterivores found in soil, fresh water and occasionally in the ocean. The only member of this phylum that is infectious to humans is Naegleria fowleri, the causative agent of the often fatal disease amoebic meningitis. The group is closely related to the Euglenozoa, and share with them the unusual characteristic of having mitochondria with discoid cristae. The presence of a ventral feeding groove in the flagellate stage, as well as other features, suggests that they are part of the Excavata group.

The amoeboid stage is roughly cylindrical, typically around 20–40 μm in length. They are traditionally considered lobose amoebae, but are not related to the others, and unlike them, do not form true lobose pseudopods. Instead, they advance by eruptive waves, where hemispherical bulges appear from the front margin of the cell, which is clear. The flagellate stage is slightly smaller, with two or four anterior flagella anterior to the feeding groove.

Usually, the amoeboid form is taken when food is plentiful, and the flagellate form is used for rapid locomotion. However, not all members are able to assume both forms. The genera Percolomonas, Lyromonas, and Psalteriomonas are known only as flagellates, while Vahlkampfia, Pseudovahlkampfia, and most acrasids do not have flagellate stages. As mentioned above, under unfavourable conditions, the acrasids aggregate to form sporangia. These are superficially similar to the sporangia of the dictyostelids, but the amoebae only aggregate as individuals or in small groups and do not die to form the stalk.

== Phylogeny ==
The first broadly sampled comprehensive phylogenomic (phylotranscriptomic) analysis of the group (from 2025) confirmed the monophyly of Heterolobosea and provided a robustly supported backbone of the phylogeny resulting in the revision of the classification of Heterolobosea to the family level.

The basal split of the cladogram has been confirmed between the subphyla Pharyngomonada (monotypic, with a sole family Pharyngomonadidae) and Tetramitia. In Tetramitia, two main clades (new classes) were identified: Selenaionea, consisting of two orders Neovahlkampfiida and Selenaionida in previously unsuspected but fully supported sister relationship, and Eutetramitea, consisting of orders Creneida, Lyromonadida, Naegleriida (new, including acrasid slime molds), Percolomonadida and Pseudociliatida (represented by the single genus Stephanopogon; not included in the new analysis but analyses based on 18S rRNA gene sequences have repeatedly shown its close relationship to Percolomonadida with high statistical support):

- Heterolobosea
  - Pharyngomonada
    - Pharyngomonadea
      - Pharyngomonadida
        Pharyngomonadidae
  - Tetramitia
    - Selenaionea
      - Neovahlkampfiida
      - Selenaionida
    - Eutetramitea
      - Naegleriida
      - - - - Percolomonadida
            - ?
              Pseudociliatida
          - Creneida
        - Lyromonadida

== Taxonomy ==
These are collectively referred to as schizopyrenids, amoeboflagellates, or vahlkampfids. They also include the acrasids, a group of social amoebae that aggregate to form sporangia. The entire group is usually called the Heterolobosea, but this may be restricted to members with amoeboid stages.

One Heterolobosea classification system is:

- Order Schizopyrenida
  - Family Vahlkampfiidae
  - Family Gruberellidae
- Order Acrasida
  - Family Acrasidae

Pleurostomum flabellatum has recently been added to Heterolobosea.

Phylum Percolozoa Cavalier-Smith 1991

- Subphylum Pharyngomonada Cavalier-Smith 1991
  - Class Pharyngomonadea Cavalier-Smith 2008 [Macropharyngomonadidea]
    - Order Pharyngomonadida Cavalier-Smith 2008 [Macropharyngomonadida]
      - Family Pharyngomonadidae Cavalier-Smith 2008 [Macropharyngomonadidae Cavalier-Smith 2008]
        - Genus Pharyngomonas Cavalier-Smith 2008 [Macropharyngomonas nomen nudum]
- Subphylum Tetramitia Cavalier-Smith 1993 em. Cavalier-Smith 2008
  - Genus ?Costiopsis Senn 1900
  - Genus ?Hoehnemastix Skvortzov 1974
  - Genus ?Planiosculum Szabados 1948
  - Genus ?Protomyxomyces Cunningham 1881
  - Genus ?Protonaegleria Michel & Raether 1985
  - Genus ?Pseudovahlkampfia Sawyer 1980
  - Genus ?Schizamoeba Davis 1926
  - Genus ?Tetramastigamoeba Singh & Hanumaiah 1977
  - Genus ?Trimastigamoeba Whitmore 1911
  - Genus ?Wasielewskia Hartmann & Schuessler 1913
  - Family Euhyperamoebidae Goodkov & Seravin 1984 [Hyperamoebidae Goodkov, Seravin & Railkin 1982]
    - Genus Euhyperamoeba Goodkov & Seravin 1984 [Hyperamoeba Goodkov, Seravin & Railkin 1982 non Alexeieff 1923]
  - Class Lunosea Cavalier-Smith 2021
    - Order Selenaionida Hanousková, Táborský & Čepička 2018
      - Family Selenaionidae Hanousková, Táborský & Čepička 2018
        - Genus Selenaion Park, De Jonckheere & Simpson 2012
        - Genus Dactylomonas Hanousková, Táborský & Čepička 2018
  - Class Neovahlkampfiea Cavalier-Smith 2021
    - Order Neovahlkampfiida Cavalier-Smith 2021
      - Family Neovahlkampfiidae Hanousková, Táborský & Čepička 2018
        - Genus Neovahlkampfia Brown & de Jonckheere 1999
  - Class Lyromonadea Cavalier-Smith 1993
    - Order Lyromonadida Cavalier-Smith 1993
      - Family Gruberellidae Page & Blanton 1985
        - Genus Gruberella Page 1984 non Gruber 1889 non Corliss 1960
        - Genus Oramoeba de Jonckheere et al. 2011
        - Genus Stachyamoeba Page 1975
        - Genus Vrihiamoeba Murase, Kawasak & Jonckheere 2010
      - Family Paravahlkampfiidae
        - Genus Fumarolamoeba De Jonckheere, Murase & Opperdoes 2011
        - Genus Parafumarolamoeba Geisen et al. 2015
        - Genus Paravahlkampfia Brown & de Jonckheere 1999
      - Family Plaesiobystridae
        - Genus Euplaesiobystra Park et al. 2009
        - Genus Heteramoeba Droop 1962
        - Genus Pernina El Kadiri, Joyon & Pussard 1992
      - Family Psalteriomonadidae Cavalier-Smith 1993 [Lyromonadidae Cavalier-Smith 1993]
        - Genus Harpagon Pánek et al. 2012
        - Genus Monopylocystis O'Kelly et al. 2003
        - Genus Psalteriomonas Broers et al. 1990 [Lyromonas Cavalier-Smith 1993]
        - Genus Pseudoharpagon Pánek et al. 2012
        - Genus Pseudomastigamoeba
        - Genus Sawyeria O'Kelly et al. 2003
  - Class Heterolobosea Page & Blanton 1985
    - Order Acrasida Schröter 1886
      - Family Acrasidae van Tieghem 1880 ex Hartog 1906
        - Genus Acrasis van Tieghem 1880
        - Genus Allovahlkampfia Walochnik & Mulec 2009 [Solumitrus Wang et al. 2011]
        - Genus Pocheina Loeblich & Tappan 1961 [Guttulina Cienkowski 1873 non D'Orbigny 1839]
    - Order Naegleriida Starobogatov 1980
      - Genus Marinamoeba De Jonckheere et al. 2009
      - Family Tulamoebidae Kirby et al. 2015
        - Genus Aurem Jhin & Park 2018
        - Genus Pleurostomum Namyslowski 1913
        - Genus Tulamoeba Park et al. 2009
      - Family Naegleriidae Kudo 1954 [Schizopyrenidae Singh 1951 ex Singh 1952; Bistadiidae Doflein 1916]
        - Genus Naegleria Aléxéieff 1912 [Adelphamoeba Napolitano, Wall & Ganz 1970; Didascalus Singh 1952; Schizopyrenus Singh 1951 ex Singh 1952]
        - Genus Willaertia de Jonckheere et al. 1984
    - Order Tetramitida Doweld 2001
      - Family Vahlkampfiidae Jollos 1917 s.s.
        - Genus Tetramitus Perty 1852 [Copromastix Aragao 1916; Learamoeba Sawyer et al. 1998, Paratetramitus Darbyshire, Page & Goodfellow 1976, Singhamoeba Sawyer, Nerad & Munson 1992]
        - Genus Vahlkampfia Chatton & LaLung-Bonnaire 1912 [Guttulidium Frenzel 1892]
    - Order Creneida Cavalier-Smith 2021
      - Family Creneidae Pánek et al. 2014
        - Genus Creneis Pánek et al. 2014
    - Order Percolomonadida Cavalier-Smith 1993
      - Family Barbeliidae Arndt 2023
        - Genus Barbelia Arndt 2021
        - Genus Nonamonas Hohlfeld, Meyer & Arndt 2023
      - Family Lulidae Hohlfeld & Arndt 2023
        - Genus Lula Arndt, Nitsche & Carduck 2021
      - Family Percolomonadidae Cavalier-Smith 1993 [Choanogasteraceae]
        - Genus Percolomonas Fenchel & Patterson 1986 [Choanogaster Pochmann 1959]
      - Family Stephanopogonidae Corliss 1961
        - Genus Nakurumonas Carduck, Nitsche & Arndt 2021
        - Genus Stephanopogon Entz 1884

== History ==
The Heterolobosea were first defined by Page and Blanton in 1985 as a class of amoebae, and so only included those forms with amoeboid stages. Cavalier-Smith created the phylum Percolozoa for the extended group, together with the poorly understood genus Stephanopogon.

Cavalier-Smith later maintained the Heterolobosea as a class for amoeboid forms. He has defined Percolozoa as "Heterolobosea plus Percolatea classis nov."
