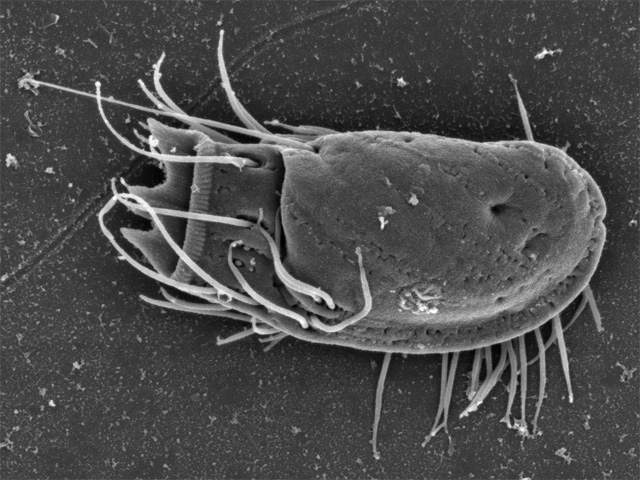
- Stephanopogon sp.

Scientific classification
- Domain: Eukaryota
- Phylum: Heterolobosea
- Class: Eutetramitea
- Order: Pseudociliatida
- Family: Stephanopogonidae
- Genus: Stephanopogon; Entz, 1884

Type species
- Stephanopogon colpoda Entz, 1884

Species
- Stephanopogon apogon Borror, 1965; Stephanopogon colpoda Entz, 1884; Stephanopogon mesnili Lwoff ,1923; Stephanopogon minuta Lei, Xu & Weibo, 1999; Stephanopogon mobilensis Jones & Owen, 1974; Stephanopogon paramesnili Lei, Xu & Weibo, 1999; Stephanopogon pattersoni Lee, Miller & Simpson, 2014

= Stephanopogon =

Genus of flagellate marine protozoan

== Characteristics and taxonomy ==
Stephanopogon superficially resemble ciliates and was originally thought to be one, but the organism is now considered to be a heterolobosean. The cell is somewhat flattened, with multiple smooth flagella arranged in rows running from the front to the back, and has an anterior mouth supported by rods. They feed on bacteria, diatoms, and other smaller organisms. There are 2-16 equally sized nuclei per cell.

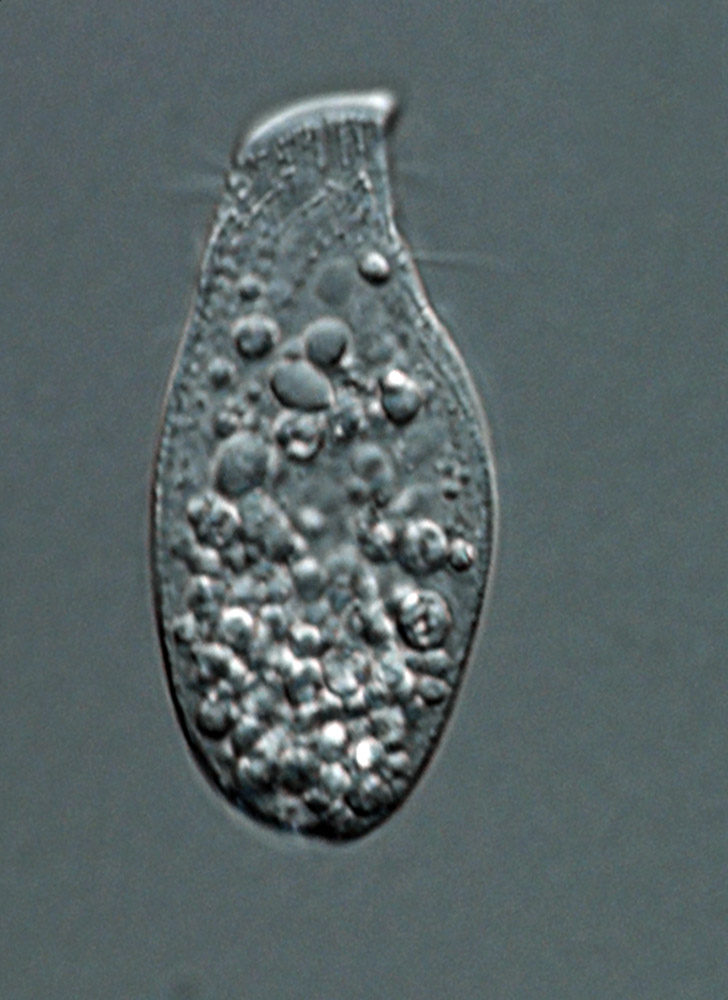
Light microscope image of living Stephanopogon

Because nuclear dimorphism is absent, Stephanopogon had been regarded as an evolutionary intermediate between the ciliates and other protozoa, and possibly an ancestor of the animals as well. Corliss and Lipscomb showed this organism is not physically similar to ciliates, lacking their complex pellicle and infraciliature. Further electron microscopical studies added details to the understanding of the cytological organization of Stephanopogon. Yubuki and Leander demonstrated that Stephanopogon is closely related to Percolomonas within the Heterolobosea. The bases of the flagella in both genera are attached to an electron dense cytoskeletal material, but it has been argued that this is not an apomorphy of the clade.

It appears to be closely related to another poorly understood genus known as Percolomonas.

The genus contains 7 species: S. apogon Borror, 1965, S. colpoda Entz, 1884, S. mesnili Lwoff, 1923, S. minuta Lei et al., 1999, S. mobilensis Jones et Owen, 1974, S. paramesnili Lei et al., 1999 and S. pattersoni Lee et al., 2014

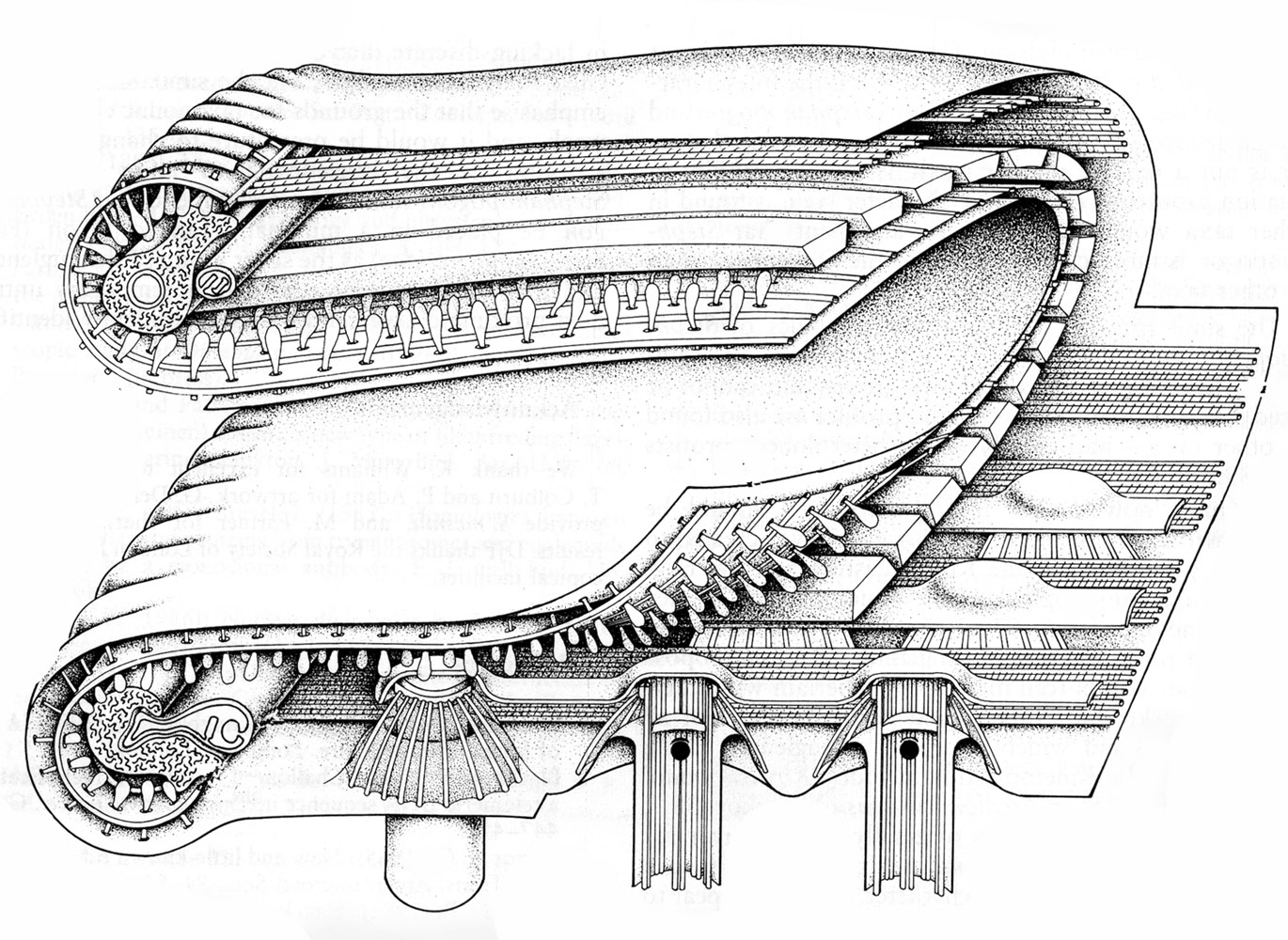
Line drawing of oral and somatic cytoskeletal elements of Stephanopogon apogon showing, to the left, the opening of the mouth, and extending from it lines of flaglla that are attached to long strips of cytoskeletal material, and are anchored to the cell surface by cones of microtubules. Small sac-like organelles are associated with the oral region of the cell.
