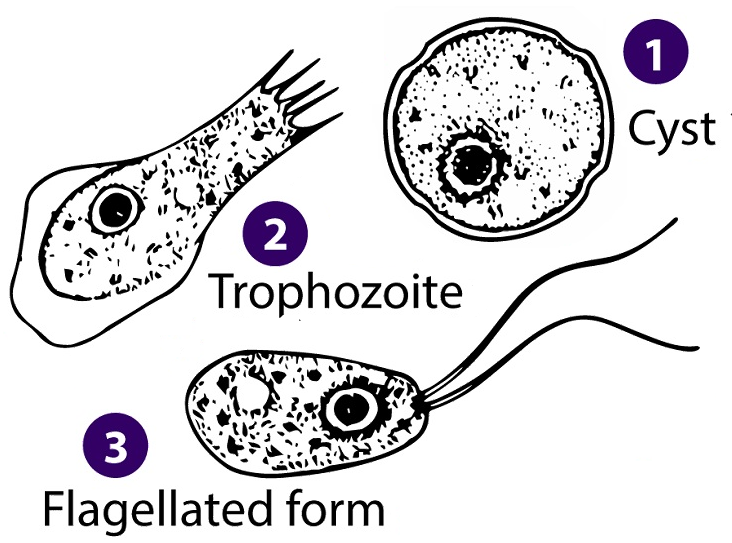
- Different stages of Naegleria fowleri

Scientific classification
- Domain: Eukaryota
- Clade: Discoba
- Phylum: Percolozoa
- Class: Heterolobosea
- Order: Schizopyrenida; Edward Drinker Cope 1871

Subdivisions
- Vahlkampfiidae (Vahlkampfiida); ?Psalteriomonadidae; ?Gruberellidae (Gruberellida)

Synonyms
- ?Amoebomastigota; Naegleriida Starobogatov 1980

= Schizopyrenida =

Order of single-celled organisms

Schizopyrenida is an order of Heterolobosea.

It contains Naegleria fowleri.

== Phylogeny ==
The cladogram from Tolweb and updated by Pánek and Čepička 2014 and family names from Cavalier-Smith 2021. It assumes that Schizopyrenida has four families under it: Tulamoebidae, Naegleriidae, Vahlkampfiidae, and Percolomonadida

- - Heterolobosea Page & Blanton 1985
    - Schizopyrenida Cope 1871
      - - - - Tulamoebidae
              - Pleurostomum
              - Tulamoeba
          - - Marinamoeba
            - Naegleriidae
              - Naegleria
              - Willaertia
      - - - Vahlkampfiidae
            - Tetramitus
            - Vahlkampfia
        - - Percolomonadida Hohlfeld 2023
            - Stephanopogonidae
              Stephanopogon
            - Percolomonadidae
              Percolomonas
