= Dangeard =

Dangeard is a surname. Notable people with the surname include:

- Frank Dangeard (1958–2025), Canadian-born French businessman
- Louis Dangeard (1898–1987), French geologist and oceanographer
- Pierre Dangeard (1895–1970), French botanist
- Pierre Augustin Dangeard (1862–1947), French botanist and mycologist
