= Sappinia dangeardi =

Scientific classification
- Domain: Eukaryota
- Clade: Amorphea
- Phylum: Amoebozoa
- Class: Discosea
- Order: Thecamoebida
- Family: Thecamoebidae
- Genus: Sappinia
- Species: S. dangeardi

Binomial name
- Sappinia dangeardi Henderson & Brown 2024

Type strain
- BF22-2A

Species of amoeba

Sappinia dangeardi is a species of amoebae belonging to the phylum Amoebozoa. It is a terrestrial species found growing on cow dung from a farm in Starkville, Mississippi.

== Etymology ==
The specific epithet, dangeardi, was chosen in recognition of the author Pierre Clement Augustin Dangeard, who originally described the genus Sappinia.

== Description ==
Sappinia dangeardi is a species of amoeba belonging to the genus Sappinia, which occasionally exhibits a 'standing' behavior where the cell attaches to the substrate and pushes most of its mass into the open air. In particular, S. dangeardi cells are significantly larger than other species such as S. pedata, both in length and width, as well as in height regarding 'standing' cells.

== Taxonomy ==
Sappinia dangeardi is a species described in 2024 by protistologists Tristan C. Henderson and Matthew W. Brown on a journal article published with other coauthors in the European Journal of Protistology. It was described from amoebae isolated from cow dung at Byrum Farm, Mississippi, USA. These amoebae were cultured on agar and fed with E. coli. The researchers examined the fine morphology of these microbes. Through sequencing of the SSU rDNA gene, the microbes were assessed as members of the genus Sappinia but phylogenetically distinct from all other known species.
