= Protistology =

Scientific discipline devoted to the study of protists

Protistology is a scientific discipline devoted to the study of protists, a highly diverse group of eukaryotic organisms. All eukaryotes apart from animals, plants and fungi are considered protists. Its field of study therefore overlaps with the more traditional disciplines of phycology, mycology, and protozoology, just as protists embrace mostly unicellular organisms described as algae, some organisms regarded previously as primitive fungi, and protozoa ("animal" motile protists lacking chloroplasts).

They are a paraphyletic group with very diverse morphologies and lifestyles. Their sizes range from unicellular picoeukaryotes only a few micrometres in diameter to multicellular marine algae several metres long.

== History ==
The history of the study of protists has its origins in the 17th century. Since the beginning, the study of protists has been intimately linked to developments in microscopy, which have allowed important advances in the understanding of these organisms due to their generally microscopic nature. Among the pioneers was Anton van Leeuwenhoek, who observed a variety of free-living protists and in 1674 named them "very little animalcules".

During the 18th century studies on the Infusoria were dominated by Christian Gottfried Ehrenberg and Félix Dujardin.

The term "protozoology" has become dated as understanding of the evolutionary relationships of the eukaryotes has improved, and is frequently replaced by the term "protistology". For example, the Society of Protozoologists, founded in 1947, was renamed International Society of Protistologists in 2005. However, the older term is retained in some cases (e.g., the Polish journal Acta Protozoologica).

== Journals and societies ==
Dedicated academic journals include:

- Archiv für Protistenkunde, 1902–1998, Germany (renamed Protist, 1998–);
- Archives de la Societe Russe de Protistologie, 1922-1928, Russia;
- Journal of Protozoology, 1954-1993, USA (renamed Journal of Eukaryotic Microbiology, 1993–);
- Acta Protozoologica, 1963-, Poland;
- Protistologica, 1968–1987, France (renamed European Journal of Protistology, 1987–);
- Japanese Journal of Protozoology, 1968-2017, Japan (renamed Journal of Protistology, 2018-);
- Protistology, 1999-, Russia.

Other less specialized journals, important to protistology before the appearance of the more specialized:

- Comptes rendus de l'Académie des sciences, 1666-, France;
- Quarterly Journal of Microscopical Science, 1853–1966, UK (renamed Journal of Cell Science, 1966–);
- Archiv für mikroskopische Anatomie, 1865–1923, Germany;
- Transactions of the Microscopical Society, 1841–1869, UK (renamed Journal of Microscopy, 1869–);
- Transactions of the American Microscopical Society, 1880–1994, USA (renamed Invertebrate Biology, 1995–);
- Memórias do Instituto Oswaldo Cruz, 1909–, Brazil.

Some societies:

- Society of Protozoloogists, 1947–2005, USA (renamed International Society of Protistologists, 2005–), with many affiliates;
- International Society for Evolutionary Protistology, 1975, USA.
- Protistology UK (previously British Society for Protist Biology)
- International Society of Protistologists (previously the Society of Protozoologists)

== Notable protistologists (sorted by alphabetical order of surnames) ==
The field of protistology was idealized by Haeckel, but its widespread recognition is more recent. In fact, many of the researchers cited below considered themselves as protozoologists, phycologists, mycologists, microbiologists, microscopists, parasitologists, limnologists, biologists, naturalists, zoologists, botanists, etc., but made significant contributions to the field.

- Carl Agardh
- William Archer
- Anton de Bary
- Karl Bělař
- Harold C. Bold
- Alexander Braun
- Otto Bütschli
- Thomas Cavalier-Smith
- Marius Chadefaud
- Carlos Chagas
- Édouard Chatton
- Tyge Ahrengot Christensen
- Lev Tsenkovsky (Cienkowski)
- Herbert Copeland
- Pierre Dangeard
- Yves Delage
- Karl Moriz Diesing
- Clifford Dobell
- Franz Theodor Doflein
- Valentin Dogiel
- Félix Dujardin
- C.G. Ehrenberg
- Hanuš Ettl
- Fauré-Fremiet
- Wilhelm Foissner
- Bohuslav Fott
- Felix Eugen Fritsch
- Wendy Gibson
- Édouard de Fromentel
- Pierre-Paul Grassé
- Battista Grassi
- Karl Gottlieb Grell
- August Gruber
- Ernst Haeckel
- Max Hartmann
- Edgard Hérouard
- Richard Hertwig
- Bronislaw M. Honigberg
- Gottfried Huber-Pestalozzi
- Alfred Kahl
- Patrick John Keeling
- Georg Klebs
- C. A. Kofoid
- Jiří Komárek
- Friedrich Traugott Kützing
- Ray Lankester
- Gordon Frank Leedale
- Louis-Urbain-Eugène Léger
- Ernst Lemmermann
- Rudolf Leuckart
- Gustav Lindau
- Alfred R. Loeblich Jr
- André Lwoff
- Lynn Margulis
- Émile Maupas
- Michael Melkonian
- Konstantin Mereschkowski
- Walter Migula
- Edward Alfred Minchin
- Øjvind Moestrup
- O.F. Müller
- Carl Nägeli
- Hermann Neubert
- Alcide d'Orbigny
- Lindsay Shepherd Olive
- Adolf Pascher
- David J. Patterson
- Eugène Penard
- Maximilian Perty
- Franz Poche
- Ernst Pringsheim Jr.
- Andrew Pritchard
- S. von Prowazek
- Gottlob Ludwig Rabenhorst
- Eduard Reichenow
- Muriel Robertson
- Julius von Sachs
- William Saville-Kent
- Asa Arthur Schaeffer
- Fritz Schaudinn
- Joseph Schröter
- Max Schultze
- F. E. Schulze
- Vladimir Shevyakov (Schewiakoff)
- C. von Siebold
- P.C. Silva
- Heinrich Leonhards Skuja
- Borís Skvortsov (Skvortzov)
- Gilbert Morgan Smith
- Frederick Kroeber Sparrow
- Friedrich von Stein
- Helen Tappan
- Alexandar Walkanow (Valkanov)
- C. M. Wenyon
- George Stephen West
- Robert Whittaker
- Heinrich Georg Winter
- Otto Zacharias
- Friedrich Wilhelm Zopf
