= Sappinia pedata =

Scientific classification
- Domain: Eukaryota
- Phylum: Amoebozoa
- Class: Discosea
- Order: Thecamoebida
- Family: Thecamoebidae
- Genus: Sappinia
- Species: S. pedata

Binomial name
- Sappinia pedata Dangeard, 1896

Species of Amoebozoa

Sappinia pedata is a free living amoeboid organism, first described by Pierre Augustin Dangeard in 1896. It belongs to the genus Sappinia within the Thecamoebida clade of Amoebozoa and is characterized by its unique monopodial locomotion and cell surface morphology. S. pedata has been found in various habitats worldwide, mostly on herbivore dung, decaying plant matter, and soil. The species has gained attention due to its potential medical relevance and has been the subject of most recent and emerging studies in Protistology and Eukaryotic Microbiology as a whole.

== Etymology ==
The name "Sappinia" was named after the late Mister Sappin-Trouffy, a mycologist at the Paris Academy of Sciences while the Latin word "pedata" means foot-like.

== Phylogeny ==
Sappinia pedata is a discosean amoebozoan that forms a highly supported clade with its sister species Sappinia diploidea, and the newly described species Sappinia platani, all of which are closely related to two Thecamoeba spp. within the Thecamoebida clade. The genus Sappinia, to which S. pedata belongs, is notable for the suspected presence of sexual reproduction, setting it apart from other flabellinid genera for which the sexual status has not been explicitly established.

Recent phylogenetic studies have suggested that the particular "brain-eating" strain identified in a case of amoebic encephalitis, may represent a new species more closely related to S. pedata than S. diploidea and S. platani. However, further research is needed to confirm the taxonomic status of this strain.

The description of S. platani as a novel species within the genus Sappinia further highlights the genetic diversity and evolutionary significance of this group of organisms and provides insight into the diversity and evolution of this major eukaryotic lineage.

== History of knowledge ==
The species S. pedata was originally established by Pierre Augustin Dangeard in 1896, who described it as a free-living, mostly binucleate amoeba with a dense glycocalyx after isolating the species from old cultures of horse dung.

Dangeard observed many remarkable things about S. pedata including cysts he described as pedicelled and a type of nuclear division that seemed to result in the formation of two closely apposed nuclei, and in some cases, four nuclei. These observations were later confirmed by Matthew Brown and colleagues well over a century later, after establishing a neotype for the same species (ATCC PRA-232) in 2007. However, no stalked cysts were found this time.

The term "Standing amoeba" was coined by Brown et al (2007) after thorough observation of the lack of a cell wall in S. pedata, concluding that the cells were neither encysted nor formed spores as described in earlier publications.

== Habitat and ecology ==
In their natural habitats, S. pedata can be found on herbivore dung, decaying plant matter, as well as soil and dog dung. In terms of geography, it has been isolated from across Europe, America and Oceania and is currently considered a worldwide species with isolates yet to be obtained from Africa.

S. pedata has been described to be preyed upon by the dung-inhabiting fungus Stylophage anomala in nature. This close association with S. anomala suggests that the amoebae may also be dispersed phoretically by the same mites that carry the fungus due to their ability to adhere to a wide range of surfaces when in its standing form.

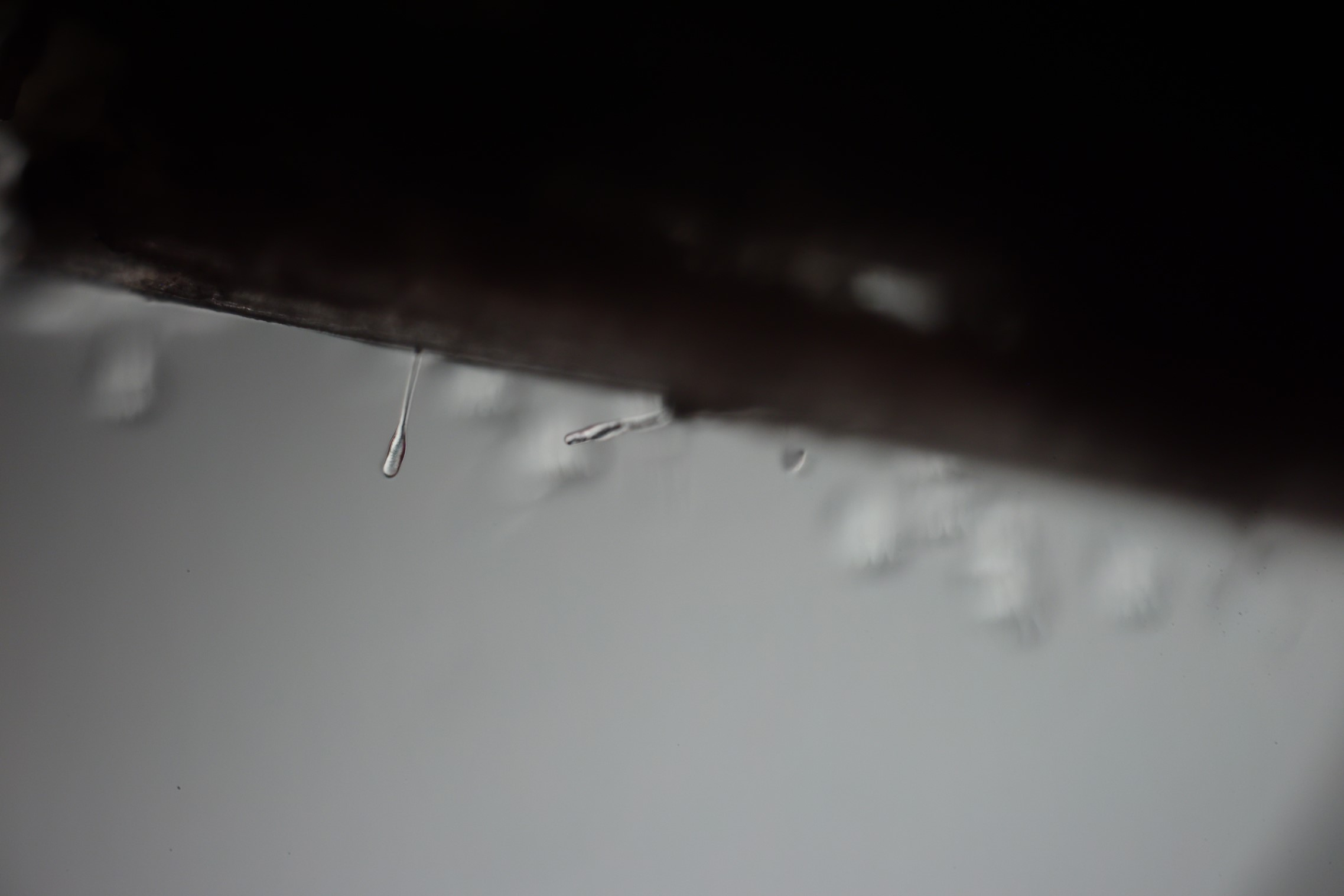
Sappinia pedata photographed at the Brown Lab, Department of Biological Sciences, Mississippi State University, MS, USA. Showing its standing amoeba on a piece of cow dung

== Morphology and life cycle ==
Sappinia pedata exhibits two distinct life cycle stages: a trophozoite stage and a cyst stage.

The trophozoites are characterized by their unique erect stage, which resembles the fruiting bodies found in protostelid slime molds. The standing amoeba of S. pedata have a club-shaped appearance that is easily recognized by the nearly colorless to a very pale yellow and slightly opaque texture. Unlike the Thecamoeba spp., the amoeba form of S. pedata does not possess the characteristic longitudinal dorsal ridges. However, irregular folds can occasionally be observed along the edges of the cell.

In terms of size, the trophozoites measure approximately 45 – 65 μm in length and 18 –35 μm in width. On the other hand, the cysts are generally smaller, with a diameter ranging from 18 – 25 μm. The cysts of S. pedata typically consists of a single cell, or two cells covered by a common wall with an outer mucilaginous layer.

It is worth noting that certain strains of S. pedata have been shown by Wylezich et al., (2009), to have no standing form, suggesting some degree of intraspecific variation in morphology.

== Medical relevance ==
Sappinia pedata gained clinical significance in 2003 when it was identified as the causative agent of amoebic encephalitis in a previously healthy young man. This case marked the first reported instance of a Sappinia species being implicated in human disease.

The patient, a non-immunosuppressed individual, was presented with symptoms including headache, nausea, vomiting, blurred vision, and seizures. Neuroimaging revealed a solitary mass in the patient's brain, which was initially thought to be a tumor. However, upon surgical removal and subsequent histopathological examination, amoebic trophozoites were discovered in the brain tissue.

At the time of initial diagnosis, the causative agent was provisionally identified as S. diploidea based on morphological characteristics. However, further molecular investigations performed by Qvarnstrom et al. in 2009 revealed that the amoebae isolated from the patient's brain tissue were genetically more closely related to S. pedata. This groundbreaking case highlighted the potential of Sappinia species to cause serious human infections, particularly in the central nervous system. Since this initial report, no additional cases of human infection caused by S. pedata or other Sappinia species have been documented and the patient is known to have survived the treatment procedures without any long-term consequences.
