= List of human disease case fatality rates =

Human infectious diseases may be characterized by their case fatality rate (CFR), the proportion of people diagnosed with a disease who die from it (cf. mortality rate). It should not be confused with the infection fatality rate (IFR), the estimated proportion of people infected by a disease-causing agent, including asymptomatic and undiagnosed infections, who die from the disease. IFR cannot be higher than the CFR and is often much lower, but is also much harder to calculate. This data is based on optimally treated patients and excludes isolated cases or minor outbreaks, unless otherwise indicated.

Key
Pathogen type	Treatment stage
Viral disease	No treatment or cure
Bacterial disease	No cure
Amoebic disease	Unvaccinated
Fungal disease	Untreated
Parasitic disease	Vaccinated/treated
Prion	Co-infection
Chromosomal Disease	Unknown
non-Prion Molecule or Chemical Element	Symptomatic

Disease	Type	Treatment stage	CFR	Notes	Refs.
Transmissible spongiform encephalopathy	Prion	No treatment and no cure	100%	Includes Creutzfeldt–Jakob disease and all its variants, fatal insomnia, kuru, Gerstmann–Sträussler–Scheinker syndrome, Variably protease-sensitive prionopathy and others. No cases of survival, invariably fatal.	
Rabies	Viral	Unvaccinated and untreated	≈100%	Preventable with vaccine and PEP (dropped to near 0% rate) but once symptoms manifest, there is no cure and the CFR is greater than 99%. 4 known people who survived were simply vaccinated too late, after symptoms started; more recently, at least 3 individuals have survived after being placed in a medically induced coma, however, this protocol has since been disputed.	
Pneumonic plague	Bacterial	Unvaccinated and untreated	≈100%	The most virulent among the three forms of plague, hypothesised to be the Black Death. Victims of the Black Death who vomited blood occasionally survived, such as the chronicler Marcha di Marco Battagli.	
Subacute sclerosing panencephalitis	Viral	Untreated	≈100%	Rare form of a measles infection, might be treatable if the disease hasn't progressed past Stage 1.	
African trypanosomiasis	Parasitic (protozoan)	Untreated	>99%	Without treatment, this disease is nearly invariably fatal due to its parasitic and extremely debilitating nature.	
Visceral leishmaniasis	Parasitic (protozoan)	Untreated	>99%		
Naegleriasis	Amoebic	with ICU treatment	≈98.5%	Caused by the amoeba Naegleria fowleri, with the nickname brain eating amoeba. From 1962 to 2022, there have been 157 recorded cases of this infection within the United States, only 4 of those 157 individuals survived the disease. A combination of various antifungal, antibacterial and antiemetic drugs have shown effectiveness in survivors.	
Glanders	Bacterial	Untreated	95%	The rate drops significantly to >50% with treatment.	
Granulomatous amoebic encephalitis	Amoebic	No cure	90%	150 cases worldwide, only < 10 survivors have been identified.	
HIV/AIDS	Viral	Untreated	99%		
Anthrax, pulmonary	Bacterial	Unvaccinated and untreated	85%	Early treatments lower the CFR to 45% as seen in the 2001 AMERITHRAX letter attacks. Monoclonal antibodies (Obilotoxaximab & Raxibacumab) could lower this further.	
Lujo virus	Viral		80%		
B virus	Viral	Untreated	≈80%	B virus infection of humans is extremely rare. As of 2020, there have been 50 documented cases of human B virus infection since the identification of the virus in 1932, 21 of which led to death. Early treatment including aciclovir can improve prognosis.	
Aspergillosis, invasive pulmonary form	Fungal	Opportunistic w/COPD, Tuberculosis and Immuno- compromised	[50–90]%		
Amoebic dysentery	Amoebic	Untreated	55-88%	Also known as amoebiasis, it is caused by the parasitic amoeba Entamoeba histolytica. Treated with Secnidazole, tinidazole, and metronidazole.	
Ebola	Viral	Unvaccinated and untreated	[25–90]%	The rate averages out at 50% for all variants of ebolaviruses, among which the one by EBOV is the deadliest in terms of both the fatality and morbidity rates, with fatalities ranging between 42% and 90%. Prognosis improved by early supportive treatments as seen in the West African epidemic and the Kivu outbreak.	
Marburg virus disease – all outbreaks combined	Viral	Untreated	[23–90]%	23% in 1967 when it was first identified and 90% in 2004-2005 when the worst outbreak of the disease occurred. Galidesivir has shown promise in treating Filoviridae.	
Smallpox Variola major	Viral	Untreated and Unvaccinated	[9.3-100]%	Eradicated. The overall fatality rate of all forms was 30%, which dropped significantly to 10% with effective treatments and 3% with vaccination. Around 90% of all the cases were the ordinary form whose untreated/unvaccinated rate was between 9.3 (normal) to 62% (confluent rashes); about 2% of the cases developed into the haemorrhagic form which approached 100% untreated fatality rate.	
Nipah virus	Viral	Untreated	[40-75]%	This rate can vary by outbreak depending on local capabilities for epidemiological surveillance and clinical management.	
Influenza A virus subtype H5N1	Viral		≈53%	The deadliest form of avian flu in humans.	
Mucormycosis (Black fungus disease)	Fungal		[40–80]%		
Tularemia, pneumonic	Bacterial	Untreated	≤ 60%		
Cryptococcal meningitis	Fungal	Co-infection with HIV	[40–60]%	6 month mortality is ≥ 60% with fluconazole-based therapy and 40% with amphotericin-based therapy in research studies in low and middle income countries.	
Anthrax, gastrointestinal	Bacterial	Unvaccinated and untreated	> 50%		
Tetanus, Generalized	Bacterial	Unvaccinated and untreated	50%	CFR drops to [10–20]% with effective treatment.	
Tuberculosis, HIV Negative	Bacterial	Vaccinated	43%	Vaccines have been developed but have been frequently dismissed for having received controversial and improper testing on African populations.	
Septicemic plague	Bacterial	Unvaccinated and untreated	[30–50]%		
Baylisascariasis	Parasitic (helminthous)		≈40%	With occurrence of Neural Larva Migrans; early, aggressive treatment necessary for survival, but only 2 full recoveries from NLM ever documented.	
Melioidosis	Bacterial	Untreated	10-60%	Caused by Burkholderia pseudomallei, is treated with antibiotics.	
Hantavirus infection	Viral		36%	Ribavirin may be a drug for HPS and HFRS but its effectiveness remains unknown, still, spontaneous recovery is possible with supportive treatment.	
Middle Eastern Respiratory Syndrome (MERS)	Viral		34%	Galidesivir has shown promise in treating Coronaviridae.	
Eastern equine encephalitis	Viral		≈33%		
Bubonic plague	Bacterial	Unvaccinated and untreated	[5–60]%		
Anthrax, gastrointestinal, oropharyngeal type	Bacterial		[10–50]%		
Varicella (chickenpox), in newborns	Viral	Untreated	≈30%	Where the mothers develop the disease between 5 days prior to, or 2 days after delivery.	
Dengue haemorrhagic fever (DHF)	Viral	Untreated	26%	Dengue haemorrhagic fever is also known as severe dengue.	
Murray Valley encephalitis (MVE)	Viral	No cure	[15–30]%	No specific treatment; usually involves supportive care.	
MRSA	Bacterial	Untreated	≈22%	A version of S. Aureus that is resistant to many antibiotics, especially β-lactam antibiotics Is treated with carbapenems, Vancomycin, or Linezolid. Mortality |rates can reach 60%.	
Hantavirus pulmonary syndrome (HPS)	Viral	Untreated	≈21%	Galidesivir has shown promise in treating Bunyavirales.	
Tularemia, typhoidal	Bacterial	Untreated	[3–35]%		
Leptospirosis	Bacterial		<[5–30]%		
Meningococcal disease	Bacterial	Unvaccinated and untreated	[10–20]%		
Typhoid fever	Bacterial	Unvaccinated and untreated	[10–20]%		
Legionellosis	Bacterial		≈15%		
Severe acute respiratory syndrome (SARS)	Viral		11%	Galidesivir has shown promise in treating Coronaviridae.	
Down syndrome	Chromosomal disease	No cure	≈10% infant mortality rate	Causes distinct facial features, muscle weakness, and intellectual disability	
Intestinal capillariasis	Parasitic (helminthous)	Untreated	≈10%		
Visceral leishmaniasis	Parasitic (protozoan)		≈10%		
Botulism	Bacterial toxin	Treated	< 10%	Untreated foodborne botulism is thought to be ≈50%.	
Diphtheria, respiratory	Bacterial	Unvaccinated and untreated	≈[5-10]%		
Yellow fever	Viral	Unvaccinated	7.5%		
Hib meningitis in young children	Bacterial	Untreated	3-6%	Caused by bacterium Haemophilus influenzae type B, is treated with antibiotics.	
Pertussis (whooping cough), infants in developing countries	Bacterial	Unvaccinated	≈3.7%		
Smallpox, Variola major	Viral	Vaccinated	3%	Eradicated. The overall fatality rate of all forms was 30%, which dropped significantly to 10% with effective treatments and 3% with vaccination. Around 90% of all the cases were the ordinary form whose untreated/unvaccinated rate was between 9.3 (normal) to 62% (confluent rashes); about 2% of the cases developed into the haemorrhagic form which approached 100% untreated fatality rate.	
Cholera, in Africa	Bacterial		≈[2–3]%	With proper treatment, may be less than 1%, while without treatment may reach 50%.	
1918 (Spanish) flu	Viral	Treated	[2.5-9.7]%	varies with population, up to 22% in Western Samoa.	
Angiostrongyliasis	Parasitic (helminthous)		≈2.4%	From Hawaiian cases.	
Measles (rubeola), in developing countries	Viral	Unvaccinated	≈[1–3]%	May reach [10–30]% in some localities.	
Brucellosis	Bacterial	Untreated	≤ 2%		
Hepatitis A, adults > 50 years old	Viral	Unvaccinated	≈1.8%		
Coronavirus disease 2019 (COVID-19)	Viral	Unvaccinated & Treated with unspecific treatments	0.88%	Depends largely on the age group of the person, earlier strains of COVID-19 had higher CFR of around 1%.	
Lassa fever	Viral	Treated	≈1%	15% in hospitalized patients; higher in some epidemics.	
Mumps encephalitis	Viral	Unvaccinated	≈1%		
Pertussis (whooping cough), children in developing countries	Bacterial	Unvaccinated	≈1%	For children 1–4 years old.	
Venezuelan Equine Encephalitis (VEE)	Viral		< 1%		
Anthrax, cutaneous	Bacterial		< 1%		
Seasonal Influenza, Worldwide	Viral	Largely unvaccinated, Treated	< 0.1–0.5%	Depends largely on the age group of the people.	
Malaria	Parasitic (protozoan)		≈0.3%		
Smallpox, Variola minor	Viral	Unvaccinated	0.1-0.3%	Eradicated. The overall fatality rate of all forms was 30%, which dropped significantly to 10% with effective treatments and 3% with vaccination. Around 90% of all the cases were the ordinary form whose untreated/unvaccinated rate was between 9.3 (normal) to 62% (confluent rashes); about 2% of the cases developed into the haemorrhagic form which approached 100% untreated fatality rate.	
Hepatitis A	Viral	Unvaccinated	[0.1–0.3]%		
Polio	Viral	Without artificial breathing support	≈0.1%	0.5% of all infected become paralysed. Of those, about [10–20]% die. Fatality rates vary by age: 2–5% for children, and up to 15–30% for adults.	
Mpox	Viral	Untreated	0.1-10%	Clade I is more virulent than clade II, with a 5-10% mortality rate	
Asian (1956–58) flu	Viral		≈0.1%		
Hong Kong (1968–69) flu	Viral		≈0.1%		
Influenza A, typical pandemics	Viral		< 0.1%		
Varicella (chickenpox), adults	Viral	Unvaccinated	0.02%		
Hand, foot and mouth disease, children < 5 years old	Viral		0.01%		
Varicella (chickenpox), children	Viral	Unvaccinated	0.001%		

== See also ==
- Lists of diseases
- List of infectious diseases
- List of causes of death by rate
- List of notifiable diseases – diseases that should be reported to public health officials.
