= Thecamoeba homeri =

Scientific classification
- Domain: Eukaryota
- Clade: Amorphea
- Phylum: Amoebozoa
- Class: Discosea
- Order: Thecamoebida
- Family: Thecamoebidae
- Genus: Thecamoeba
- Species: T. homeri

Binomial name
- Thecamoeba homeri Henderson & Brown 2024

Type strain
- SK13-4B

Species of amoeba

Thecamoeba homeri is a species of amoebae belonging to the phylum Amoebozoa. It is a terrestrial species first isolated and identified from soil in Mississippi. It is distinguished by the formation of a doughnut-shaped cell during its life cycle.

== Etymology ==
The specific epithet, homeri, was chosen after the cartoon character Homer Simpson from The Simpsons, in reference to the doughnut pastries that this character loves. This is due to the doughnut shape that cells of Thecamoeba homeri occasionally adopt.

== Description ==
Thecamoeba homeri is a species of amoeba belonging to the genus Thecamoeba, characterized by a central ovoid cell nucleus and prominent dorsal folds that run longitudinally across each cell. In particular, T. homeri is unique due to exhibiting 'doughnut behavior'. During its life cycle, the amoeba forms a transient doughnut-shaped or ring-like cell morphology, a phenomenon that has never been documented before.

== Taxonomy ==
Thecamoeba homeri is a species described in 2024 by protistologists Tristan C. Henderson and Matthew W. Brown on a journal article published with other coauthors in the European Journal of Protistology. It was described from amoebae isolated from soil at Harned Hall, Mississippi, USA. These amoebae were cultured on agar and fed with E. coli. The researchers examined the fine morphology of these microbes. Through sequencing of the SSU rDNA gene, the microbes were assessed as members of the genus Thecamoeba but phylogenetically distinct from all other known species. A strain sister to T. homeri was described, named SK13-4H, but was lost shortly after the isolation and molecular sequencing.
