= Dangeardiella =

Scientific classification
- Kingdom: Fungi
- Division: Ascomycota
- Class: Dothideomycetes
- Subclass: incertae sedis
- Genus: Dangeardiella; Sacc. & P. Syd.

Type species
- Dangeardiella macrospora (J. Schröt.) Sacc. & P. Syd.

Species
- D. fusiformis D. macrospora

Genus of fungi

Dangeardiella is a genus of fungi in the class Dothideomycetes. The relationship of this taxon to other taxa within the class is unknown (incertae sedis).

The genus name of Dangeardiella is in honour of Pierre Clement Augustin Dangeard (1862–1947), who was a botanist and mycologist known for his investigations of sexual reproduction in fungi. He was the father of botanist Pierre Dangeard (1895–1970) and geologist Louis Dangeard (1898–1987).

The genus was circumscribed by Pier Andrea Saccardo and Paul Sydow in Syll. Fung. Vol.14 on page 683 in 1899.

== See also ==
- List of Dothideomycetes genera incertae sedis
