= Amebic encephalitis =

Amebic encephalitis may refer to:

- Primary amoebic meningoencephalitis
- Granulomatous amoebic encephalitis
