= Thecamoeba vicaria =

Scientific classification
- Domain: Eukaryota
- Clade: Amorphea
- Phylum: Amoebozoa
- Class: Discosea
- Order: Thecamoebida
- Family: Thecamoebidae
- Genus: Thecamoeba
- Species: T. vicaria

Binomial name
- Thecamoeba vicaria Mesentsev, Surkova, Kamyshatskaya, Nassonova & Smirnov 2023

Species of amoeba

Thecamoeba vicaria is an amoeba that belongs to the genus Thecamoeba and can be found in various habitats. Due to its distinctive morphological features, T. vicaria can be easily differentiated from other amoeboid organisms in culture. Locomotion, in Thecamoeba species, is not aided by pseudopodia, as seen in most Amoeba. Although T. vicaria was previously misclassified as part of a different species group, careful reevaluation of the Thecamoeba terricola species boundaries has allowed T. vicaria to be recognized as a separate species.

== Ecology ==
Thecamoeba species have a broad ecological distribution. Depending on the species, they can be found in freshwater and marine habitats. Some species may only be found in terrestrial habitats, such as soil or organic debris, such as leaf litter and moss. T. vicaria is primarily found in soil environments.

== Morphology ==
Thecamoeba vicaria is characterized by its flat teardrop morphology, smooth outline, and convex dorsal surface. Aiding in its identification is a wrinkled cell surface consisting of multidirectional (rugose) or parallel ridges (striate). Cell dimensions of the locomotive form are 162-269 μm in length and 129-190 μm in width.

== Behavior ==
Locomotion consists of cell elongation towards the direction of movement without the formation of discrete pseudopodia. Some Thecamoeba species, in culture, have been observed to lack adhesion or movement on the substrate. Instead, they tend to float in water under microscopic evaluation. T. vicaria exhibits standing behavior, forming a doughnut shape, and is most seen on solid surfaces, such as agar. Standing behavior results from T. vacaria elevating most of its cell body above the solid surface or substrate, which is thought to be a response to desiccation.

== Taxonomic history ==
Thecamoeba vicaria was previously thought to be part of the T. terricola group due to their close resemblance. However, after F. J. Page and A. W. D. Larkum reisolated and re-examined T. terricola, T. vicaria was identified and is now considered its own species. T. vicaria reclassification was aided by light and electron microscopy methods, 18s rRNA gene sequencing, and comparison to earlier T. terricola data.
