= Amoebic encephalitis =

Amoebic encephalitis or amoebic meningoencephalitis may refer to several potentially fatal diseases that are infections of the central nervous system by free-living amoebae, often referred to in the media as a "brain-eating amoeba" infection:

- Granulomatous amoebic encephalitis
- Primary amoebic meningoencephalitis, also known as primary amoebic meningoencephalitis
