= Dadja Altenburg-Kohl =

Czech doctor and entrepreneur

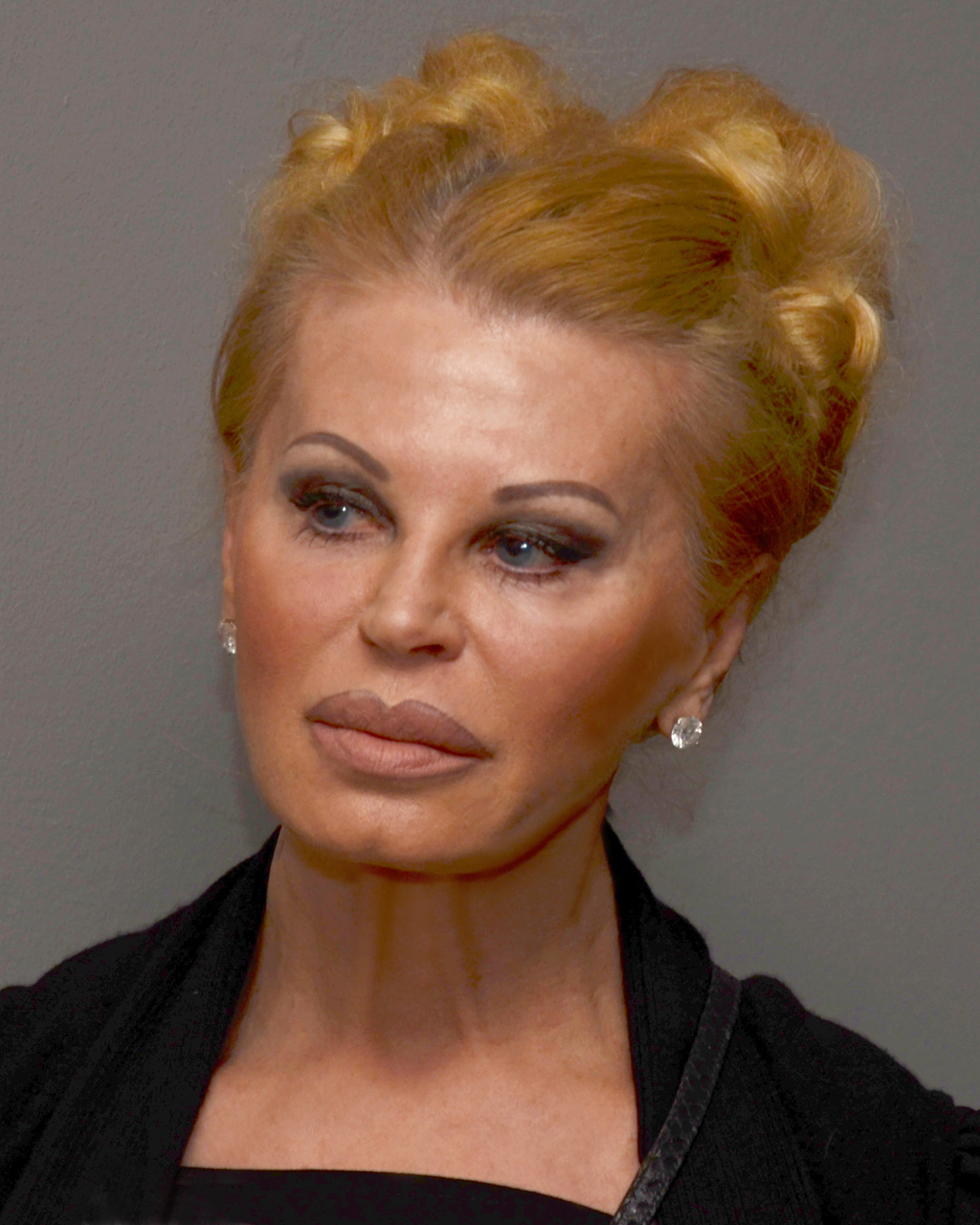
Dadja Altenburg-Kohl in 2017

Drahoslava "Dadja" Altenburg-Kohl (born 30 May 1949) is a Czech doctor and entrepreneur. She lived and worked in Germany from the 1970s to the 1990s. She is also a philanthropist and patron of the arts; shortly after returning to the Czech Republic, Altenburg-Kohl established the DrAk Foundation and the Museum Montanelli in Prague.

== Medical and business career ==
Altenburg-Kohl was born on 30 May 1949 in Prague. She studied at the Faculty of Medicine at Charles University in Prague. In 1972 she emigrated to West Germany for political reasons, and began working as a doctor at the university clinic in Frankfurt am Main in 1973, where she specialized in jaw surgery. In 1980, she opened a private practice in this field. In 1986, she and her husband Edwin Kohl established a pharmaceutical company, Kohlpharma, which later became part of Kohl Medical AG, of which Dr. Altenburg-Kohl has been co-owner and board member since 1993.

Shortly after the 1989 revolution, Altenburg-Kohl founded the Czech-based company Pragofarm, focused on the sale and distribution of medication. Another project in Germany was Assist, founded in 1995, a company involved in providing enteral nutrition and aids for chronically ill patients. Since 1995, she has also been the co-owner of Amigo, which develops games for children and adults. In collaboration with professor Michael Melkonian, head researcher at the Botanical Institute of the University of Cologne, she established Algenion in 2004, a company involved in the use of microphytes. In 2004, she began to work in both the Czech Republic and Germany. She returned to Prague in 2006, where she lives with her husband Daniel Pešta. She has four adult children. Altenburg-Kohl has been a member of the advisory board of Munich-based UniCredit Group XX since 2010.

In 2012, Altenburg-Kohl was awarded the title of Professor at Kohlpharma for recognition of her work in the fine arts and relationship between Germany and the Czech Republic.

== Cultural activities ==
In 2003, Altenburg-Kohl founded the Montanelli Gallery at Nerudova street (Neruda's street) 13 in Prague. Six years later, it became the Museum Montanelli. The museum's patron was president Václav Havel, who officially opened the museum in 2009. In 2005, Altenburg-Kohl was elected to the board of the Europäisches Kulturforum in Berlin. She is also the curator for several joint projects between the Saarländische Galerie in Berlin and the Czech Republic.

The DrAk Foundation, founded in Prague in 2006, focuses on the fields of culture and medical prevention. The foundation's art collection is administered by the Museum Montanelli. As the museum's curator, Dr. Altenburg-Kohl has participated in monographic and thematic exhibitions and has organized international exchanges with other museums and galleries. The DrAk Foundation also supports theatre (National Theatre, Divadlo Ungelt), film (Citizen Havel Is Rolling Barrels), and cancer prevention (MammaCare manual breast examinations).

In Prague, Dr. Altenburg-Kohl has been a supporter of the National Theatre since 2005. She is a member of the theatre's board and a founder of its Benefactors' Club. She has provided financial support for numerous performances (Mozart's Don Giovanni, the jazz opera A Well-Paid Walk directed by Miloš Forman, and the ballet Causa Carmen). She also provided a large gift to the National Theatre's ballet ensemble and purchased a concert violin by Mihály Reményi (made in 1909) for the orchestra. In 2009, she helped to restore Vojtěch Hynais's theatre curtains and with her husband donated a bronze bust of Václav Havel. In 2013, Altenburg-Kohl's family financed the first phase of restoring the National Theatre's lunettes by Mikoláš Aleš and František Ženíšek. The restoration work is set to last until 2015.

Since 2012, she has appeared on stage as a member of the National Theatre's ballet ensemble during performances of Sleeping Beauty. She has twice been awarded the D Award by the National Theatre's director.

Altenburg-Kohl received the Trebbia Foundation's European Award for support of culture – 2011 Person of the Year.
