= Brain-eating amoeba =

Topics referred to by the same term

The term "brain-eating amoeba" has been used to refer to several microorganisms:

- Naegleria fowleri, which causes primary amoebic meningoencephalitis
- Acanthamoeba spp., which causes the slow-acting infection acanthamoebiasis
- Balamuthia mandrillaris, which causes balamuthiasis
- Paravahlkampfia francinae, which causes a form of primary amoebic meningoencephalitis
- Sappinia pedata, which causes a form of granulomatous amoebic encephalitis
