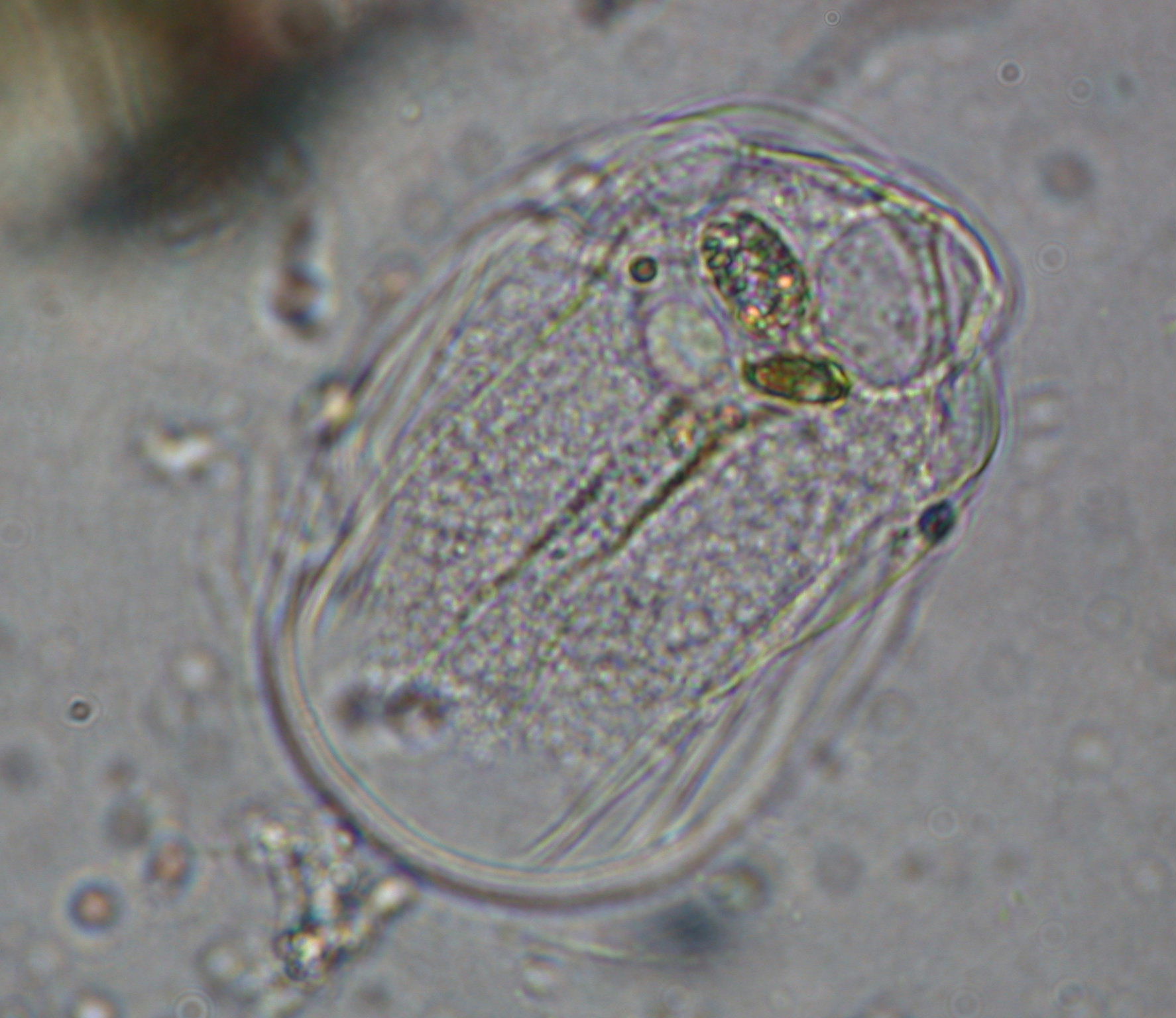
- Thecamoeba striata

Scientific classification
- Domain: Eukaryota
- Phylum: Amoebozoa
- Class: Discosea
- Order: Thecamoebida
- Family: Thecamoebidae
- Genus: Thecamoeba de Fromental 1874

Synonyms
- Striamoeba Jahn, Bovee & Griffith 1974; Thorntonius Singh, Misra & Sharma 1982

= Thecamoeba =

Genus of amoebae

Thecamoeba is a genus of Amoebozoa with a tough pellicle simulating a shell.

It includes the species:

- T. aesculea Kudryavtsev & Hausmann 2009
- T. assimilis Lepşi 1960
- ?T. bilizi (Schaeffer 1926)
- ?T. circita Dumas 1929
- ?T. corrugata Bovee 1953
- T. cosmophorea Mesentsev & Smirnov 2019
- ?T. exapartirta Escomel 1929
- T. hilla Schaeffer 1926
- T. hoffmani Sawyer, Hnath & Conrad 1974
- T. homeri Henderson & Brown 2024
- T. munda Schaeffer 1926
- T. orbis Schaeffer 1926
- ?T. ovalis Lepşi 1960
- ?T. papyracea (Penard 1905)
- T. pulchra (Biernacka 1963) Page 1977
- T. quadrilineata (Carter 1856) Lepşi 1960
- ?T. quinquepartita Dumas 1929
- ?T. rugosa Schaeffer 1926
- T. similis (Greeff 1891) Lepşi 1960
- T. sparolata (Fishbeck & Bovee 1993)
- T. sphaeronucleolus (Greeff 1891) Schaeffer 1926
- T. striata (Penard 1890) Schaeffer 1926
- T. terricola (Greeff 1866) Lepşi 1960
- T. verrucosa (Ehrenberg 1838) Schaeffer 1926
- T. vicaria F. J. Page and A. W. D. Larkum 2023
