= Sappinia =

Scientific classification
- Domain: Eukaryota
- Clade: Amorphea
- Phylum: Amoebozoa
- Class: Discosea
- Order: Thecamoebida
- Family: Thecamoebidae
- Genus: Sappinia; Dangeard, 1896

Type species
- Sappinia pedata Dangeard, 1896

Species
- Sappinia diploidea (Hartmann & Naegler, 1908) Alexieff, 1912; Sappinia pedata Dangeard, 1896; Sappinia platani Wylezich, et al. 2015

Genus of amoebae

Sappinia is a genus of heterotrophic, lobose amoebae within the family Thecamoebidae. A defining feature of Sappinia, which separates it from its sister genus Thecamoeba, is the presence of two closely apposed nuclei with a central, flattened connection. Sappinia species have two life cycle stages: a trophozoite and a cyst. Up until 2015, only two species had been discovered, Sappinia pedata and Sappinia diploidea. Sequencing of the small subunit rRNA of a particular isolate from a sycamore tree revealed a new species, Sappinia platani. Sappinia species were once thought to be coprozoic (living in feces), as the first strains were isolated from animal dung. More research has shown that they are typical free-living amoebae, and can be found worldwide in soil, plant litter, and standing decaying plants, as well as freshwater ponds. In 2001, the first and only case of human pathogenesis in Sappinia was confirmed. The patient was a non-immunocompromised 38-year-old male who presented signs of amoebic encephalitis and who patient made a full recovery after treatment with several antimicrobials. The CDC initially classified the causative agent as S. diploidea based on morphological characteristics, but in 2009, Qvarnstrom et al. used molecular data to confirm that the true causative agent was S. pedata.

== Etymology ==
The name Sappinia was named after Mister Sappin-Trouffy, who was a mycologist at the Paris Academy of Sciences, where the genus was first discovered.

== History of knowledge ==
The genus Sappinia was discovered in 1896 by Pierre Augustin Dangeard at the Paris Academy of Sciences. Dangeard noticed white patches on a desiccated culture of horse dung, and when viewed under the microscope, he observed many amoebae. These amoebae were generally binucleated and resembled the myxamoeba life cycle stage present in some plasmodial slime molds; however, Dangeard never observed the plasmodia stage. This was the first species of Sappinia discovered, Sappinia pedata. The second species discovered, Sappinia diploidea was originally named Amoeba diploidea, and was first found in 1908 by Max Hartmann and Kurt Nägler. It was isolated from the intestinal material of a lizard; however, it was not thought to be parasitic, as it was not found in 20 other lizards sampled, and a very similar strain was isolated from soil. It was named "diploidea" because the organism was only ever seen in the diploid stage. Nägler stated that there is no true haploid stage; however, further studies have not been able to come to this conclusion, as the nuclei become difficult to discern during sexual reproduction. In 1912 A. diploidea was transferred to the genus Sappinia by Alexis Alexeieff. He classified the genus Sappinia on the basis of being mostly binucleate, with promitotic cell division without the presence of an equatorial plate. Up until very recently these were the only known species of Sappinia, but a new study published in 2015 indicates the discovery of a third species, Sappinia platani, isolated from the bark of a sycamore tree. Sequencing of its small subunit ribosomal RNA (SSU rRNA) confirmed that it is a member of the genus Sappinia, but genetically distinct from S. pedata and S. diploidea. Morphologically, S. platani appears very similar to a typical member of Sappinia, but contains dictyosomes, which had not been reported in this genus previously.

== Habitat and ecology ==
Initially, members of Sappinia were thought to be only coprozoic, as they were first found in animal feces; however, they have now been found in many other habitats, and are considered typical free living amoebae. Sappinia species are found worldwide in soil, plant litter, and standing decaying plants, freshwater ponds, and have also been found in the feces of horses, lizards, bison, elk, buffalo, and dogs. They are heterotrophic, and feed mostly on bacteria and smaller amoebae. Sappinia species, like many other free-living amoebae, play an important role in nutrient cycling in soil. Sappinia species and their sister genus Thecamoeba are susceptible to infection by rozellids, that act as endonuclear parasites. Sappinia species are not generally susceptible to bacterial infection; but, they have been shown to harbor bacterial endosymbionts. In a recent study, Corsaro et al. (2016), found that all of the Sappinia strains tested harbored distinct species of Flavobacterium and/or Pedobacter, which are not known to be commensals of any other free-living amoebae. When these bacterial endosymbionts were isolated, they were unable to grow them in culture, thus they hypothesize that these bacterial species are obligate endosymbionts specific to the genus Sappinia. Although Sappinia species are generally considered to be non-parasitic, there has been one confirmed case of amoebic encephalitis in a non-immunocompromised 38-year-old male caused by S. pedata.

== Description of the organism ==
=== Anatomy and morphology ===
Sappinia species are naked, lobose amoebe that are generally binucleate. They range in size from 45 to 76 mm long by 18–38 mm wide. They move using monopodial locomotion, and have a large hyaline region at the anterior end of the cell. The posterior end of the cell is usually jagged; however, there is no distinct uroid (ruffled membrane caused by the movement of cytoplasm out of that region) in motile cells. Sappinia tend to form distinct clusters in culture, possibly due to congregation where the bacterial count is highest. The sister genus Thecamoeba does not produce a true theca (shell), but are so named because they contain a very thick, dense glycocalyx, which can be up to 0.5 mm thick. Unlike Thecamoeba, Sappina species have highly varied glycocalyces depending on the strain and life cycle stage, and none are as thick or well defined as in Thecamoeba. Another difference between Thecamoeba and Sappinia is the surface of the dorsal region; Thecamoeba species tend to have well defined longitudinal ridges on the dorsal surface, whereas Sappinia species have a smooth dorsal surface, with some small wrinkles along the edges of the cell. Sappinia species also contain tubular mitochondrial cristae, and have a large contractile vacuole that changes in shape during locomotion. S. pedata has erect, cyst-like, standing amoebae, while S. platani has dictyosomes . The erect standing amoebae were originally observed by Dangeard (1896) in S. pedata, and were originally called spores or pedicellate cysts, as they looked similar to the spore-bearing stalks seen in slime molds. Further studies have concluded that there is no cell wall present in these standing amoebae, and they continue to change shape while in the erect position, therefore they are not cysts or spores. Sappinia species are generally binucleate, with two large, closely apposed nuclei with a flattened, desmosome-like connection. This is a defining feature of Sappinia, as their sister genus Thecamoebae are mononucleate, and in other binucleate amoebae such as Pelomyxa binucleata, the nuclei are not closely apposed. Each nucleus is between 3.8 and 4.6 mm in diameter, each with its own central nucleolus that is around 2.3 mm in diameter.

=== Life cycles ===
Sappinia species have two life cycle stages: a trophozoite, and a cyst. The trophozoite is the heterotrophic feeding stage described previously, and the cyst is formed from the fusion of two trophozoites. The cysts are usually round, and between 30 and 34 mm in diameter. In 1908, Nägler was working on S. diploidea and after 2–3 weeks in culture he observed 2 equal size trophozoites encyst together in a double wall. Nägler stated that first the pairs of nuclei in each trophozoite fuse, and then the cells fuse together in the cyst. The amoeba that arises from the cyst is thought to have two haploid nuclei, making it a diploid, thus there is no true haploid life cycle stage. Many other studies have found these bicellular, double walled cysts in both S. diploidea and S. pedata; however, the fusion of nuclei has never been documented, as they become very difficult to detect during this process, therefore the exact process of sexual reproduction (including the presence of a haploid stage) are not currently known. The encystation process is likely to be used for sexual reproduction. Nägler had also stated that when exposed to dry conditions for long periods of time, the trophozoites did not encyst, further supporting the hypothesis that the cysts are used for sexual reproduction, and not as protection from desiccation. Sappinia species also undergo asexual reproduction, as described by Nägler in 1908. First the two nuclei divide, and two pairs of nuclei are formed in parallel configuration. Then the nuclei cross and become anti-parallel, so that each daughter cell receives half of each of the two nuclei. Cell division then occurs, and binucleate trophozoites are formed. Although the majority of cells are binucleate, many studies have observed cells with one or four nuclei, and some studies have also observed cells with three, six, and eight nuclei. According to Walochnik et al. (2010), Nägler observed that the rare, mononucleate cells "mostly derived from copulation when one of the copulating amoebae degraded so that the final amoeba was a product of parthenogenesis, the nuclei of one and the same individual fusing, or, but very rarely, derived from cells in which the reduced gametic nuclei of the copulating amoebae fused". Uninucleate amoebae are found more often in older cultures, with fragmented nucleoli, and usually later degrade. The presence of more than two nuclei is due to nuclear division, without cell division occurring immediately after. In the case of very rare trinucleate cells found by Brown et al. (2007), it is due to incomplete nuclear division. When tetranucleate cells are found, the two pairs are not appressed to each other.

=== Genetics and phylogeny ===
Molecular analyses have been used to determine the phylogenetic position and evolutionary relationships of Sappinia. Sequencing of SSU rRNA has shown the distinct separation of the three species S.pedata, S. diploidea, and S. platani, and has confirmed that Sappinia forms a monophyletic group with their sister genus Thecamoeba within the family Thecamoebidae. Brown et al. (2007), also looked at the actin gene sequences of Sappinia and Thecamoeba and found that they only differed by two amino acids, which also supports that they are sister groups. The genus Stenamoeba has recently been shown to be an early branching member of Thecamoebidae, thus Thecamoebidae currently consists of three genera. Dermamoeba algensis was previously placed within the family Thecamoebidae based on morphological characteristics, but molecular studies have shown that based on molecular data they do not belong within Thecamoebidae, and their phylogenetic position is currently being debated.

== Medical importance ==
Amoebic encephalitis is an infection of the brain caused by various different amoebae, for example Naegleria fowleri, Acanthamoeba species, Balamuthia mandrillaris, or Entamoeba histolytica. These infections are rare, and usually lethal. Naegleria fowleri causes primary amoebic encephalitis (PAE), which progresses very rapidly, whereas Acanthamoeba species cause granulomatous amoebic encephalitis (GAE), which is also usually lethal, but develops slower than PAE. Acanthamoeba species and Balamuthia mandrillaris usually only cause disease in immunocompromised patients and Entamoeba histolytica can cause encephalitis after infecting another region in the body. There has been only one documented case of pathogenesis involving Sappinia species, which resulted in granulomatous amoebic encephalitis in a non-immunocompromised 38-year-old male from Texas in 1998. The fact that the patient was non-immunocompromised is surprising because there is only one known amoeba (Naegleria fowleri) that causes disease in healthy individuals. The patient lived on a farm and was in close contact with grazing farm animals, which is likely where he contracted the infection. The Sappinia species was likely in the soil, and was consumed by a grazing animal along with plant matter, and was then expelled in the feces. The patient is thought to have inhaled the Sappinia species while cleaning up the animal dung. As described by Gelman et al. (2003), the patient "presented with a history of loss of consciousness for 45 min and emesis, followed by bifrontal headache, photophobia, and blurry vision for 2 to 3 days" (p. 990). His medical history only consisted of a recent sinus infection, which was probably due to Sappinia, which then spread to the brain. An MRI revealed a 2 cm mass in the left temporal lobe, and when excised, showed necrotizing hemorrhagic inflammation containing trophozoite amoebae. The trophozoites were between 40 and 60 mm in diameter, and had two closely apposed nuclei with a distinct central flattening. The trophozoites also contained tubular mitochondrial cristae, and a large contractile vacuole. All of these characteristics are distinguishing features of the genus Sappinia. The medical team sent the sample to the CDC, who confirmed that these characteristics do not coincide with any previously known pathogenic amoebae in humans. The patient was treated with several antimicrobials and recovered completely. After 14 months, the CDC diagnosed the causative agent as S. diploidea based on morphological characteristics. In 2009, Qvarnstrom et al. reevaluated this conclusion, as the morphological characteristics present in the scans cannot distinguish between S. diploidea and S. pedata. Qvarnstrom et al. (2009) first used PCR primers and TaqMan probes to detect if the trophozoites did in fact belong to Sappinia, and to rule out other amoeba genera. They found that the DNA was that of Sappinia, and no other amoebae DNA was found. They then had to use species-specific PCR primers for S. diploidea and S. pedata to determine the causative agent. Qvarnstrom et al. (2009) found that the sample tested negative for S. diploidea but had S. pedata-specific priming sites, which then allowed them to conlucde that the causative agent of GAE in this case was S. pedata.

== List of species ==
- Sappinia pedata
- Sappinia dangeardi Henderson & Brown 2024
- Sappinia diploidea
- Sappinia platani
