= Nitroxoline =

Antibiotic chemical compound

Clinical data
- AHFS/Drugs.com: International Drug Names
- ATC code: J01XX07 (WHO)

Legal status
- Legal status: US: IND

Identifiers
- IUPAC name: 5-nitro-quinolin-8-ol
- CAS Number: 4008-48-4
- PubChem CID: 19910
- DrugBank: DB01422
- ChemSpider: 18756
- UNII: A8M33244M6
- KEGG: D07245
- ChEMBL: ChEMBL1454910
- CompTox Dashboard (EPA): DTXSID4046284
- ECHA InfoCard: 100.021.513

Chemical and physical data
- Formula: C_{9}H_{6}N_{2}O_{3}
- Molar mass: 190.158 g·mol^{−1}
- 3D model (JSmol): Interactive image
- SMILES: [O-][N+](=O)c1ccc(O)c2ncccc12
- InChI: InChI=1S/C9H6N2O3/c12-8-4-3-7(11(13)14)6-2-1-5-10-9(6)8/h1-5,12H; Key:RJIWZDNTCBHXAL-UHFFFAOYSA-N

Nitroxoline is an antibiotic that has been in use in Europe for about fifty years, and has proven to be very effective at combating biofilm infections. Nitroxoline was shown to cause a decrease in the biofilm density of P. aeruginosa infections, which would allow access to the infection by the immune system in vivo. It was shown that nitroxoline functions by chelating Fe^{2+} and Zn^{2+} ions from the biofilm matrix; when Fe^{2+} and Zn^{2+} were reintroduced into the system, biofilm formation activity was restored. The biofilm degradation ability is comparable to EDTA derivatives, but this drug has a history of human use in clinical settings and therefore has a precedent with which to allow its use against “slimy” biofilm infections.

== Anticancer activity ==
The chelating activities of nitroxoline have also been used in an anticancer setting. Nitroxoline has been shown to be more cytotoxic to HL60, DHL-4, PANC-1, and A2780 cells lines than clioquinol and other 8-hydroxyquinoline derivatives. It also demonstrated an increase in reactive oxygen species (ROS) production over controls, especially when Cu^{2+} was added. The ROS levels reached over 350% of the controls with addition of CuCl_{2}. The cytotoxicity production was markedly decreased with addition of ZnCl_{2}, indicating, based on this model, that nitroxoline is not a zinc chelator. Because the zinc chelating action of clioquinol has been associated with subacute myelo-optic neuropathy, the use of nitroxoline as a cytotoxic drug in the treatment of cancers should not exhibit neurotoxic effects in humans, and in vivo trials on tumour xenografts in mice have not yielded any negative neurodegenerative effects.

Nitroxoline has been shown to inhibit the enzymatic activity of cathepsin B. Cathepsin B degrades extra-cellular membrane proteins in tumor cells, allowing them to proliferate more freely, and metastasize throughout the body. Nitroxoline was shown to be a noncompetitive, reversible inhibitor of these actions in MCF-10A neoT cells. The K_{i} (dissociation constant) values it demonstrates are comparable to other reversible inhibitors of cathepsin B. This indicates that it may be a candidate for further trials as an anticancer drug, especially given its history as an antimicrobial agent and its well-known pharmacokinetic profile. The mechanism of action by which nitroxoline inhibits cathepsin B may also suggest that further research of noncovalent, noncompetitive inhibitors of cathepsin B could be warranted. In fact, it was recently shown that a balance exists between the potency and the kinetics of a molecule, reflected in the molecular weight, which must be optimized in order to create the best drug for inhibition of a target enzyme. For example, a certain inhibitor may have a high affinity for an enzyme, but it may prove impractical to use in a clinical setting for treatment because of its size.

Nitroxoline and its analogues have also been shown to have antiangiogenic properties. For example, nitroxoline inhibits MetAP2 activity, an enzyme associated with angiogenesis, and HUVEC proliferation. This is further evidence that nitroxoline would make an effective anticancer drug. With different derivatives of nitroxoline demonstrating various levels of inhibition, nitroxoline may also prove to be a novel starting point for future research into cancer treatment.

== Balamuthia infection ==
In 2018, nitroxoline was identified via a clinical metagenomic next-generation sequencing analysis as a compound that could be repurposed as an amoebicidal agent against Balamuthia mandrillaris which causes the fatal disease granulomatous amoebic encephalitis (GAE).

In 2021, a patient survived an infection of Balamuthia mandrillaris after treatment with nitroxoline. The man had been given the recommended drug therapy of pentamidine, sulfadiazine, azithromycin, fluconazole, flucytosine, and miltefosine but progressed negatively. Therefore the regimen was complemented with nitroxoline which required the permission of the FDA as the drug isn't approved in the United States. The cerebral lesion shrank only one week later after the new drug was added and the man later recovered.
