= Case fatality rate =

Medical measurement formula

In epidemiology, case fatality rate (CFR), or sometimes more accurately case-fatality risk, is the proportion of people who have been diagnosed with a certain disease and end up dying of it. Unlike a disease's mortality rate, the CFR does not take into account the time period between disease onset and death. A CFR is generally expressed as a percentage. It is a measure of disease lethality, and thus may change with different treatments. CFRs are most often used for discrete, limited-time courses, such as acute infections.

== Terminology ==
The mortality rate – often confused with the CFR – is a measure of the relative number of deaths (either in general, or due to a specific cause) within the entire population per unit of time. A CFR, in contrast, is the number of deaths among the number of diagnosed cases only, regardless of time or total population.

From a mathematical point of view, by taking values between 0 and 1 or 0% and 100%, CFRs are actually a measure of risk (case fatality risk) – that is, they are a proportion of incidence, although they do not reflect a disease's incidence. They are neither rates, incidence rates, nor ratios (none of which are limited to the range 0–1). They do not take into account time from disease onset to death.

Sometimes the term case fatality ratio is used interchangeably with case fatality rate, but they are not the same. A case fatality ratio is a comparison between two different case fatality rates, expressed as a ratio. It is used to compare the severity of different diseases or to assess the impact of interventions.

Because the CFR is not an incidence rate by not measuring frequency, some authors note that a more appropriate term is case fatality proportion.

== Example calculation ==
If 100 people in a community are diagnosed with the same disease, and 9 of them subsequently die from the effects of the disease, the CFR would be 9%. If some of the cases have not yet resolved (neither died nor fully recovered) at the time of analysis, a later analysis might take into account additional deaths and arrive at a higher estimate of the CFR, if the unresolved cases were included as recovered in the earlier analysis. Alternatively, it might later be established that a higher number of people were subclinically infected with the pathogen, resulting in an IFR below the CFR.

A CFR may only be calculated from cases that have been resolved through either death or recovery. The preliminary CFR, for example, of a newly occurring disease with a high daily increase and long resolution time would be substantially lower than the final CFR, if unresolved cases were not excluded from the calculation, but added to the denominator only.

$\text{CFR in }{\%} = \frac\text{Number of deaths from disease}\text{Number of confirmed cases of disease}\times100$

== Infection fatality rate ==
Like the case fatality rate, the term infection fatality rate (IFR) also applies to infectious diseases, but represents the proportion of deaths among all infected individuals, including all asymptomatic and undiagnosed subjects. It is closely related to the CFR, but attempts to additionally account for inapparent infections among healthy people. The IFR differs from the CFR in that it aims to estimate the fatality rate in both sick and healthy infected: the detected disease (cases) and those with an undetected disease (asymptomatic and not tested group). Individuals who are infected, but show no symptoms, are said to have inapparent, silent or subclinical infections and may inadvertently infect others. By definition, the IFR cannot exceed the CFR, because the former adds asymptomatic cases to its denominator.

$\text{IFR in }{\%} = \frac\text{Number of deaths from disease}\text{Number of infected individuals}\times100$

== Examples ==
Some examples will suggest the range of possible CFRs for diseases in the real world:

- The CFR for the Spanish (1918) flu was greater than 2.5%, while the Asian (1957–58) and Hong Kong (1968–69) flus both had a CFR of about 0.2%.
- As of 05 Aug 2026, coronavirus disease 2019 has an overall CFR of 0.91%, although the CFRs of earlier strains of COVID-19 was around 2%, the CFRs for original SARS and MERS are about 11% and 34%, respectively.
- The CFR for yellow fever is about 5-6% (but 40-50% in severe cases).
- Legionnaires' disease has a CFR of about 15%.
- Left untreated, bubonic plague will have a CFR of up to 60%. With antibiotic treatment, the CFR for bubonic plague is 17%, pneumonic 29% and septicaemic 45%.
- Active tuberculosis, the infection with the highest mortality rate, has a CFR of 43% in the absence of HIV.
- Ebola virus disease, one of the infections with the highest lethality, has a CFR as high as 90%.
- Naegleriasis (also known as primary amoebic meningoencephalitis), has a CFR greater than 95%, with a few of the survivors having been treated with heroic doses of amphotericin B and other off-label drugs.
- Rabies has a CFR greater than 99% in unvaccinated individuals. A few people have survived either by being vaccinated (but after symptoms started, or else later than ideal), or more recently, by being put into a medically induced coma.

== See also ==
- List of human disease case fatality rates
- Mortality rate – Deaths per 1,000 individuals per year
- Pandemic severity index – Proposed measure of the severity of influenza
