= Karl Bělař =

Austrian microbiologist

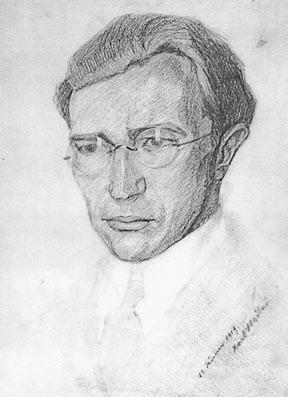
Self portrait, c. 1919

Karl Franz Josef Bělař (Czech pronunciation: [ˈbjɛlaːr̝̊] lit. "whitewasher" in Bohemian-Czech; October 14, 1895 – May 24, 1931) was an Austrian microbiologist. He was among the first to demonstrate that cell division by protists involved mitosis.

== Background ==
Bělař was born in Vienna where his father Franz worked as a lawyer. An older sister became a mathematician while another sister was married to scientist who had a laboratory setup at home. Young Karl made use of this home laboratory, especially the microscope to study microscopic life forms even before he went to the University of Vienna and apart from his interest in protists made use of his skills in drawing, cartooning and photography. His first publication was on a flagellate Prowazeckia josephi which he described at the age of 19. During World War I he served on the Italian front as an artillery lieutenant. He returned to studies in 1919 and received a doctorate in zoology. He then joined the Kaiser Wilhelm Institute of Biology in Berlin under Max Hartmann. Although an Austrian Roman-Catholic he married a Protestant colleague, Gertrud Bengelsdorff. He continued studies in Berlin and became a privatdozent in 1924 and an associate professor in 1930. He was invited as a guest lecturer at California Institute of Technology by T.H. Morgan and worked there between 1929 and 1931. Just before his return to Berlin he was killed in a car accident in the Mojave desert near Victorville where he had visited so as to paint a landscape.
