= Frank Dangeard =

Canadian-born French businessman (1958–2025)

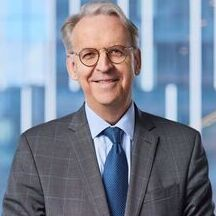
- Official UK government portrait
- Born: Frank Emmanuel Dangeard; 25 February 1958; Ottawa, Ontario, Canada
- Died: 13 August 2025 (aged 67)
- Education: HEC Paris; Sciences Po; Harvard Law School
- Occupation: Businessman

Frank Emmanuel Dangeard (25 February 1958 – 13 August 2025) was a Canadian-born French businessman.

== Life and career ==
Born in Ottawa on 25 February 1958, Dangeard studied at HEC Paris, Sciences Po, and Harvard Law School. He worked as a lawyer in the United States and the United Kingdom from 1986 to 1989 before serving as manager of S. G. Warburg & Co. He then joined Thomson Multimedia in 1997 before serving as Director General of France Télécom from 2002 to 2004. From 2004 to 2008, he was CEO of Thomson. He received a golden parachute of €2.28 million in the midst of his dismissal from the position. In 2011, he published a book titled La Décision de crise dans l'entreprise, which covered 12 stories of governance during times of crisis.

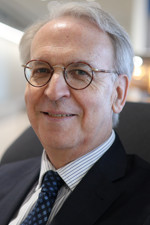
Official UK government portrait

Dangeard's other executive roles included his time as administrator of Crédit Agricole, Moser Baer, Sonaecom, Symantec, and Telenor.

Dangeard died on 13 August 2025, at the age of 67, after a long illness.
