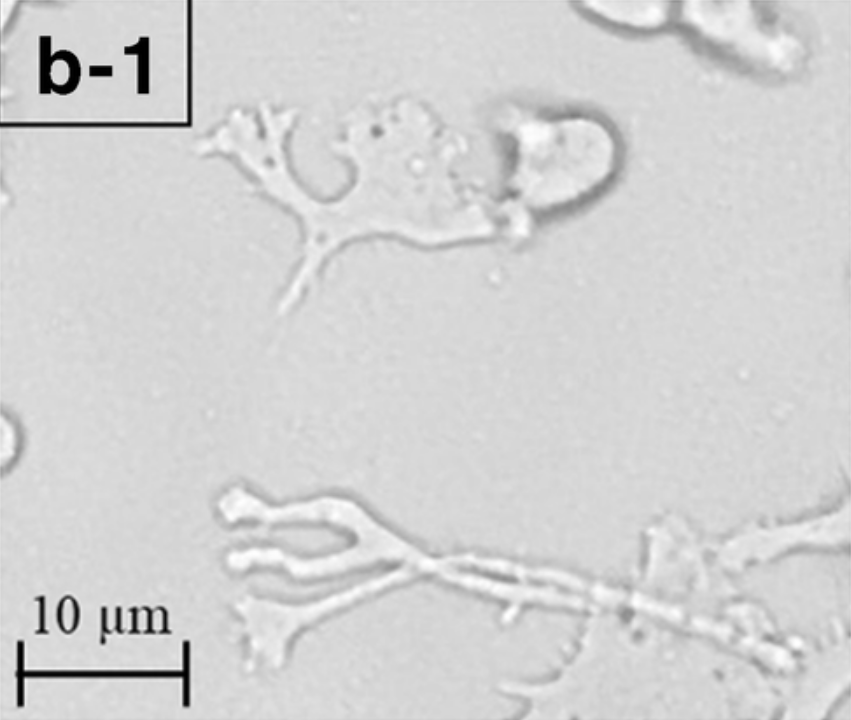
- Trophozoite (active) form of Balamuthia mandrillaris
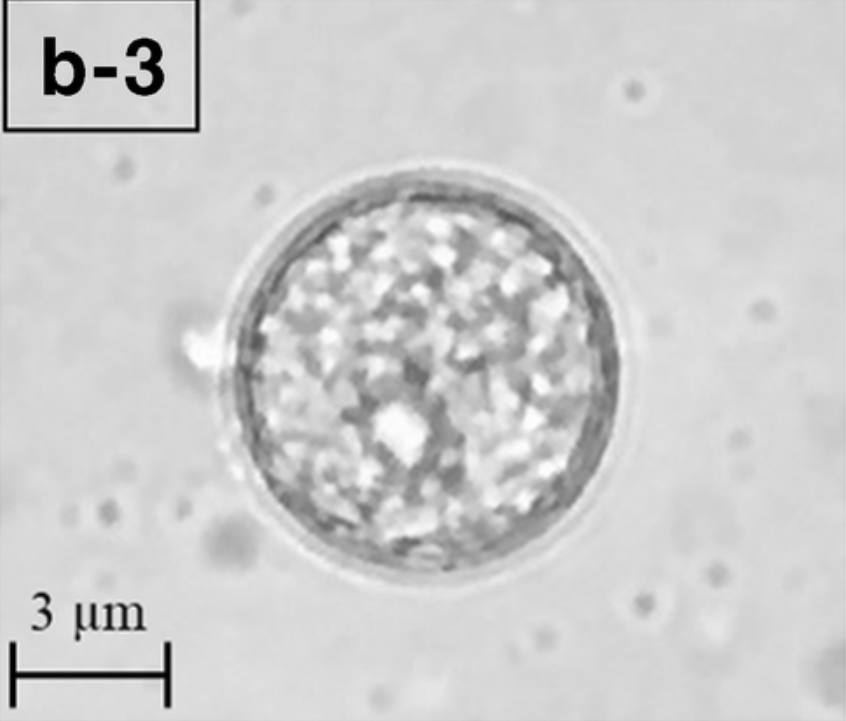
- A Balamuthia mandrillaris cyst

Scientific classification
- Domain: Eukaryota
- Phylum: Amoebozoa
- Class: Discosea
- Order: Centramoebida
- Family: Balamuthiidae
- Genus: Balamuthia; Visvesvara et al., 1993
- Species: B. mandrillaris

Binomial name
- Balamuthia mandrillaris Visvesvara et al., 1993

= Balamuthia mandrillaris =

Species of pathogenic Amoebozoa

Balamuthia mandrillaris is a free-living amoeba that causes the rare but deadly infectious disease granulomatous amoebic encephalitis (GAE). B. mandrillaris is a soil-dwelling amoeba and was first discovered in 1986 in the brain of a mandrill that died in the San Diego Wild Animal Park.

B. mandrillaris can infect the body through open wounds or possibly by inhalation. Balamuthia has been isolated from soil. It is believed to be distributed throughout the soils of temperate regions of the world. This is supported somewhat by the detection of antibodies to the protist in healthy individuals.

The generic name Balamuthia was given by Govinda Visvesvara, after his mentor, parasitologist William Balamuth, for his contributions to the study of amoebae. Visvesvara isolated and studied the pathogen for the first time in 1993.

== Morphology ==
B. mandrillaris is a free-living, heterotrophic amoeba, consisting of a standard complement of organelles surrounded by a three-layered cell wall (thought to be made of cellulose), and with an abnormally large cell nucleus. On average, a Balamuthia trophozoite is about 30 to 120 μm in diameter. The cysts fall around this range, as well.

== Life cycle ==
Balamuthia's lifecycle, like the Acanthamoeba, consists of a cystic stage and a non-flagellated trophozoite stage, both of which are infectious, and both of which can be identified in the brain tissue on microscopic examination of brain biopsies performed on infected individuals. The trophozoite is pleomorphic and uninucleated, but binucleated cells are occasionally seen. Cysts are also uninucleated, possessing three walls: an outer thin irregular ectocyst, an inner thick endocyst, and a middle amorphous fibrillar mesocyst.

== Pathology ==
B. mandrillaris is larger than human leukocytes, thus making phagocytosis impossible. Instead, the immune system attempts to contain them at the portal of entry (usually an open wound) by mounting a type IV hypersensitivity reaction. Upon introduction, the amoeba may form a skin lesion, or in some cases, may migrate to the brain, causing a condition known as granulomatous amoebic encephalitis (GAE), which is usually fatal. This granulomatous feature is mostly seen in immunocompetent patients; immunocompromised individuals exhibit a "perivascular cuffing". Balamuthia-induced GAE can cause focal paralysis, seizures, and brainstem symptoms such as facial paralysis, difficulty swallowing, and double vision.

Balamuthia may also cause a variety of non-neurological symptoms, including skin lesions, which can progress to GAE. Patients experiencing this particular syndrome may report a skin lesion (often similar to those caused by MRSA), which does not respond well to antibiotics. The lesion is usually localized and very slow to heal, or fails to heal altogether. In some presentations, this infection may be mistaken for certain forms of skin cancer or cutaneous leishmaniasis. Balamuthia lesions are most often painless.

== Culturing and identification ==
Biopsies of skin lesions, sinuses, lungs, and the brain can detect B. mandrillaris infection. The amoeba cannot be cultured on an agar plate coated with E. coli because, unlike Naegleria or Acanthamoeba, Balamuthia mandrillaris does not feed on bacteria. Instead, Balamuthia must be cultured on primate hepatocytes or human brain microvascular endothelial cells. Formalin-fixed paraffinized biopsy specimens may indicate Balamuthia trophozoites in the perivascular space. The cysts can be visualized by calcofluor white, which binds to polysaccharides on the cyst wall. Trophozoites appear circular during infection.

Vero cells have been suggested as a possible cheaper and faster alternative to culture the organism. Several types of animal cells have been used in B. mandrillaris culturing including rat glioma cells, human lung cells, and human brain microvascular endothelial cells. These animal cells are added to a specified sterilized growth medium for co culturing with the pathogen. This can also help differentiate between Balamuthia and other protozoa.

Axenic culture methods that are of importance to antiprotozoal drug development have also been reported within the last decade

== Treatment ==
Infection seems to be survivable if treated early. Two individuals, a 5-year-old girl and a 64-year-old man, developed GAE. After diagnosis, they were treated with flucytosine, pentamidine, fluconazole, sulfadiazine, a macrolide antibiotic and trifluoperazine. Both patients recovered. In 2018, an unsuccessful attempt at treatment of a Balamuthia infection after nasal lavage with untreated tap water was reported.

Nitroxoline has shown interesting properties in vitro and might be a possible treatment for this infection. A man treated with nitroxoline at UCSF Medical Center in 2021, following a seizure that was identified to have resulted from CNS invasive Balamuthia infection, survived and recovered from the disease, indicating that nitroxoline might be a promising medication. An opinion article published in the Washington Post in 2025 mentions a pediatric patient who recovered from the infection after being administered nitroxoline.

== Organ transplantation ==
According to a report published in Morbidity and Mortality Weekly Report in September 2010, two confirmed cases of Balamuthia transmission occurred through organ transplantation in December 2009 in Mississippi. Two kidney recipients, a 31-year-old woman and a 27-year-old man, suffered from post-transplant encephalitis due to Balamuthia. The woman died in February 2010 and the man survived with partial paralysis of his right arm. The CDC was notified by a physician on December 14, 2009, about possible transplant transmission in these two patients. Histopathologic testing of donor and recipient tissues confirmed the transmission. Two other patients who received heart and liver transplants from the same donor, but in different hospitals, were placed on preemptive therapy and remain unaffected. A second cluster of transplant-transmitted Balamuthia in Arizona was reported in the same weekly report. Four recipients were identified, two from Arizona (liver and kidney-pancreas), one from California (kidney), and another from Utah (heart). Recipients from Arizona—a 56-year-old male and a 24-year-old male—both succumbed to GAE within a span of 40 days from transplantation. The other two were placed on preemptive therapy after the first two were reported and remain unaffected.
