= Granulomatous amoebic encephalitis =

Rare and usually fatal brain infection by certain amoebae

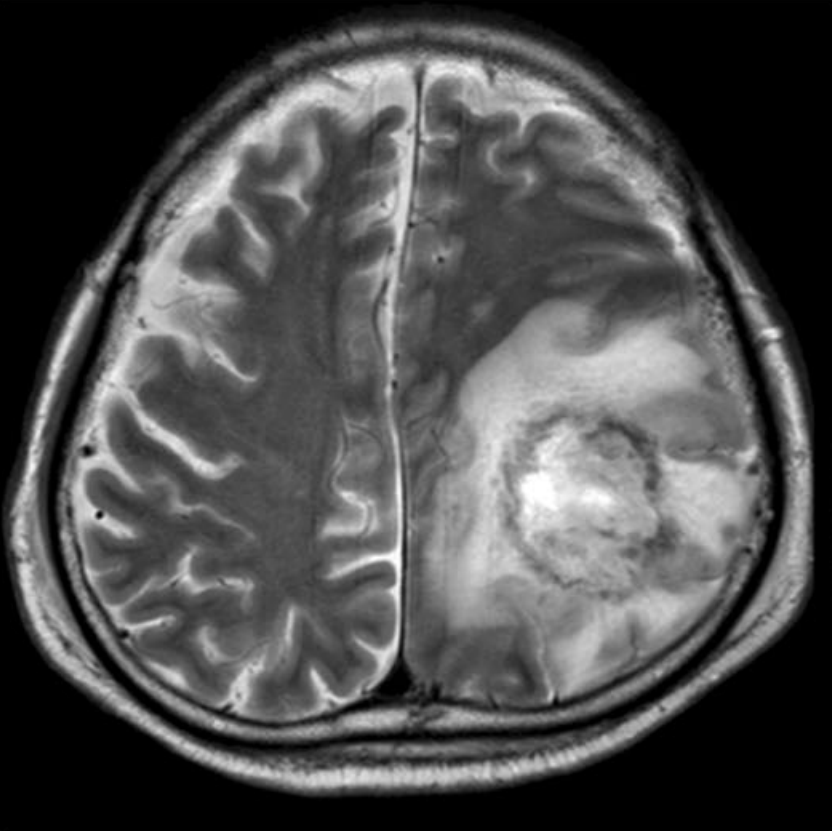
- T2-weighted MRI showing a necrotic brain abscess caused by Acanthamoeba.
- Specialty: Infectious diseases
- Symptoms: Fever, headaches, personality changes
- Complications: seizures, coma, risk of death
- Causes: Acanthamoeba spp., Balamuthia mandrillaris, and Sappinia pedata
- Medication: Nitroxoline, miltefosine, azole antifungals

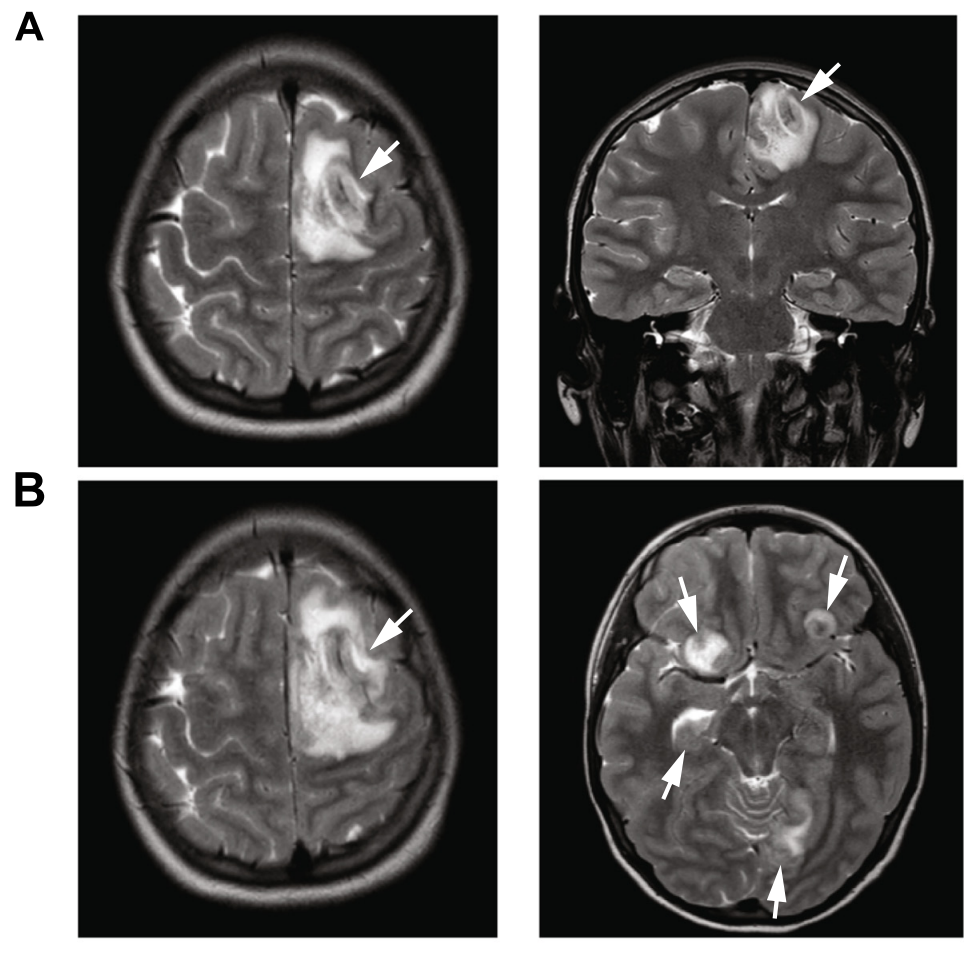
A: T2-weighted MRI showing multiple necrotic brain abscesses as a result of a Balamuthia mandrillaris infection. B: T1-weighted MRI showing expansion of the brain infection 4 days later

Granulomatous amoebic encephalitis (GAE) is a rare, nearly invariably fatal, subacute-to-chronic central nervous system (CNS) disease caused by certain species of free-living amoebae of the genera Acanthamoeba, Balamuthia and Sappinia. The term is most commonly used with Acanthamoeba. In more modern references, the term "balamuthia amoebic encephalitis" (BAE) is commonly used when Balamuthia mandrillaris is the cause. Similarly, Sappinia amoebic encephalitis (SAE) is the name for amoebic encephalitis caused by species of Sappinia.

== Signs and symptoms ==
GAE begins slowly, with symptoms like headache, nausea, dizziness, irritability, and a low-grade fever. The CNS symptoms depend on the part of the brain that is infected. Changes in behavior are an important sign. Other CNS signs may include seizures, focal neurologic signs, diplopia (double vision), cranial nerve palsies, ataxia, confusion, and personality changes.

The clinical presentation of GAE may mimic glioma (especially brainstem glioma), or other brain diseases, which may hamper timely diagnosis. The symptoms are caused by inflammatory necrosis of brain tissue brought on by compounds released from the organisms.

== Diagnosis ==
The condition can be difficult for doctors to diagnose because it is a rare disease. A brain biopsy will reveal the presence of infection by pathogenic amoebas. In GAE, these present as general inflammation and sparse granules. On microscopic examination, infiltrates of amoebic cysts and/or trophozoites will be visible.

== Pathophysiology ==
The causative organism for SAE was originally identified as Sappinia diploidea, but is now considered to be Sappinia pedata.

== Treatment ==
=== Acanthamoeba ===
Antifungal drugs including ketoconazole, miconazole, 5-flucytosine and pentamidine have been shown to be effective against Acanthamoeba in vitro.

=== Balamuthia ===
Like with Acanthamoeba, infection of the brain with this organism rapidly turns fatal in most cases. However some survivors have been reported:

Two patients survived after being successfully treated with a therapy consisting of flucytosine, pentamidine, fluconazole, sulfadiazine, and azithromycin. Thioridazine or trifluoperazine was also given. Successful treatment in these cases was credited to "awareness of Balamuthia as the causative agent of encephalitis and early initiation of antimicrobial therapy."

In one case, cloxacillin, ceftriaxone, and amphotericin B were tried, but this treatment protocol did not prove effective.

Nitroxoline has shown interesting properties in vitro and might be a possible treatment for this infection. A man treated with nitroxoline at UCSF Medical Center in 2021, following a seizure that was identified to have resulted from CNS invasive Balamuthia infection, survived and recovered from the disease, indicating that nitroxoline might be a promising medication. An opinion article published in the Washington Post in 2025 mentions a pediatric patient who survived and recovered from a CNS invasive Balamuthia infection after taking nitroxoline.

=== Sappinia ===
It has been treated with azithromycin, pentamidine, itraconazole, and flucytosine.

== Prognosis ==
Even with treatment, CNS infection with Acanthamoeba is often fatal, and there are very few recorded survivors, almost all of whom had permanent neurocognitive deficits. The prognosis is largely influenced by the time of diagnosis, how virulent and sensitive the Acanthamoeba strain is, and, most crucially, the immune status of the affected person. Due to it commonly being an opportunistic infection, the prognosis is generally poor, with a mortality rate approaching 90%.

Sappinia pedata can cause GAE; however, only one case of GAE due to S. pedata infection has ever been reported, and the patient survived without any long-term consequences.

== See also ==
- Naegleriasis, an almost invariably fatal infection of the brain by the percolozoan Naegleria fowleri
