= Protist (journal) =

Scientific journal focusing on protists

- Discipline: Protists
- Language: English
- Edited by: Michael Melkonian

Publication details
- Former name(s): Archiv für Protistenkunde
- History: 1902-present
- Publisher: Elsevier
- Frequency: Bimonthly
- Impact factor: 2.702 (2017)

Standard abbreviations
- ISO 4: Protist

Indexing
- ISSN: 1434-4610 (print); 1618-0941 (web)
- OCLC no.: 39018023

Links
- Journal homepage; Protist archives; Archiv für Protistenkunde archives

Protist is a peer-reviewed scientific journal focusing on protists. It was founded as Archiv für Protistenkunde by editor Fritz Schaudinn in 1902, and originally published by Gustav Fischer and later Jena. The journal is now published by Elsevier, and is currently edited by Michael Melkonian (Botanical Institute, University of Cologne). The journal changed its name to Protist in 1998.

== Abstracting and indexing ==
The journal is abstracted and indexed in the following bibliographic databases:

- Abridged Index Medicus
- Abstracts on Hygiene and Communicable Diseases
- BIOSIS
- Biological Abstracts
- CAB Abstracts
- Cambridge Scientific Abstracts
- Chemical Abstracts
- Current Advances in Ecological and Environmental Sciences
- Current Contents/Agriculture, Biology & Environmental Sciences
- Current Contents/Life Sciences
- EMBASE/Excerpta Medica
- Elsevier BIOBASE/Current Awareness in Biological Sciences
- Helminthological Abstracts
- Index Veterinarius
- MEDLINE
- Oceanographic Literature Review
- Protozoological Abstracts
- Referativnyi Zhurnal
- Research Alert
- Science Citation Index Expanded
- Science Citation Index
- Scopus
- Tropical Diseases Bulletin
- Veterinary Bulletin

According to the Journal Citation Reports, the journal has a 2017 impact factor of 2.702.
