= European Journal of Protistology =

- Discipline: Biology
- Language: English

Publication details
- Publisher: Elsevier
- Impact factor: 3.471 (2021)

Standard abbreviations
- ISO 4: Eur. J. Protistol.

Indexing
- ISSN: 0932-4739

Links
- Journal homepage; Online archive

The European Journal of Protistology is a scientific journal that covers the entire scope of protistology, from their development and ecology to molecular biology. The journal is published by Elsevier. It is official journal of the Federation of European Protistological Societies.

== Abstracting and indexing ==
The journal is abstracted and indexed for example in:

- Web of Science
- Elsevier BIOBASE

According to the Journal Citation Reports, the journal has a 2021 impact factor of 3.471.
