= Louis Dangeard =

French geologist and oceanographer

- Born: April 29, 1898; Poitiers, France
- Died: April 15, 1987; Paris, France
- Education: University of Paris
- Known for: studies on seabed sediments
- Scientific career
- Fields: Geology and Oceanography
- Workplaces: University of Paris; University of Clermont-Ferrand; University of Caen

Louis Marie Bernard Dangeard (April 29, 1898, in Poitiers, France – April 15, 1987, in Paris, France) was a French geologist and oceanographer. He was son of the botanist and mycologist Pierre Augustin Dangeard. His brother was the botanist Pierre Dangeard. Louis Dangeard was one of the founders of modern oceanography.

== Biography ==
Louis Dangeard was born on April 29, 1898, in Poitiers. He was the youngest of four siblings. His father had come from Caen in 1891 to take up a professorship at the Académie des Sciences, the scientific faculty of the University of Poitiers. In 1909 the family moved to Paris, where his father had been offered a post at the prestigious scientific faculty of the University of Paris.

Louis Dangeard studied geology in Paris and, in 1919 moved to the scientific faculty of the University of Rennes working as an academic assistant. In 1923 he was offered a permanent position and, in 1928, he was promoted to assistant professor. From 1922 to 1927 he took part in seven oceanographic expeditions organized by Jean Charcot with the research vessel Pourquoi Pas?. These research trips covered the North Sea, the Bay of Biscay and in particular the English Channel. Dangeard's main focus of research was the investigation of the seabed. In 1928 he received his doctorate with a thesis on the geology of the seabed of the English Channel.

In 1930 Dangeard was appointed professor of geology at the scientific faculty of the University of Clermont-Ferrand, but switched in 1933 to the Chair of Geology at the Faculté des Sciences at the University of Caen, Lower Normandy, where he succeeded Alexandre Bigot. His scientific work concentrated mainly on sedimentology and petrography.

By January 1926, Louis Dangeard had married the 22-year-old Louise Marie Joseph Marcille (1902 to 1980). The couple had six children: Henri, Yves, Alain, Anne, Armelle and Gilles Louise Marie. He retired from his professorial chair at the University of Caen in 1968. His wife died in 1980, and Dangeard died in 1987 at the age of 88.

== Memberships and honors ==
- Dangeard was a member of the French Geological Society. During his lifetime a valley system of the eastern English Channel was named the Fosse Dangeard in his honor.
- 1955 elected President of the French Geological Society

== Works ==
- Louis Dangeard: La Normandie. Vol. 7 of the series edited by Albert F. de Lapparant (Directeur de CNRS): Actualités Scientifiques et Industrielles 1140 Géologie Régionale de la France. Hermann & Cie, Paris 1951.
- Suez, Hurghada, Djibouti : Mission Louis Dangeard-Paul Budker dans la mer rouge et en Somalie francaise: 7 decembre 1938 - 9 fevrier 1939 / par Louis Dangeard Volume 1. 1941
- "Carte lithologique des mers de France," in Geologie der Meere und Binnengewässer. Berlin: Bornträger, 1937-44. Vol. 3, Pt. 2, pp. 129–142, 1939
- Observations De Géologie Sous-Marine et D'océanographie Relatives à La Manche. Ed. Blondel La Rougery, Paris et Lyon. 1928

Dangeard also published numerous academic articles throughout his career.
