= Sappinia diploidea =

Scientific classification
- Domain: Eukaryota
- Phylum: Amoebozoa
- Class: Discosea
- Order: Thecamoebida
- Family: Thecamoebidae
- Genus: Sappinia
- Species: S. diploidea

Binomial name
- Sappinia diploidea (Hartmann & Nägler, 1908)

Species of amoeba

Sappinia diploidea is a free-living amoeba species.

== Background ==
Sappinia can be found worldwide. It usually occurs in elk and buffalo feces, places where farm animals are known to eat, soil containing rotting plants, and fresh water sources.

== Clinical significance ==
It is capable of causing infectious disease in humans.

=== Symptoms of Sappinia infection ===
Symptoms of a Sappinia infection include headache, photophobia, nausea or upset stomach, vomiting, blurred vision, and loss of consciousness. A scan of the one, infected patient’s brain also revealed a 2-centimeter tumor-like mass on the back left section of his brain.

=== Treatment ===
Treatment for the one identified case of Sappinia infection included the removal of a tumor in the brain and a series of drugs given to the patient after surgery. This treatment led to the patient’s full recovery.
