= Michael Melkonian =

German botanist (born 1948)

- Occupation: Senior Professor of Phycology

Academic background
- Education: University of Hamburg

Academic work
- Discipline: Phycologist
- Institutions: University of Duisburg-Essen University of Cologne University of Münster

Michael Melkonian (born 1948) is a German botanist and phycologist. He was a professor of botany at the University of Cologne from 1988 to 2017. He is currently a senior professor of phycology at the University of Duisburg-Essen.

== Early life and education ==
Michael Melkonian was born in 1948 in Hamburg. He earned his bachelor's degree in botany at the University of Hamburg in 1974. He received a doctorate in Botany with a focus in plant physiology in 1978 from the University of Hamburg.

== Career ==
From 1978 to 1988 Melkonian was an Assistant Professor to the Botany Department at the University of Münster. In 1982, he was a visiting assistant professor at the Albert Einstein College of Medicine of Yeshiva University. From 1986–1988 he was a Heisenberg Fellow of the German Research Foundation (DFG).

In 1988, he moved to the University of Cologne as a full professor and Chair of the Botany department. In 2001 Melkonian became the Director of the Central Collection of Algal Cultures (CCAC). Melkonian became a Professor Emeritus in 2017. In 2019, he became a Senior Professor of Phycology at the University of Duisburg-Essen.

Melkonian played a role in establishing multiple phycological societies in Europe, including organizing the first European Phycological Congress and encouraging the founding of the Hellenic Phycological Society.

Melkonian holds 16 patents and is a co-founder of Algenion GmbH & Co. KG, an algal biotech company.

== Research ==
Melkonian's research primarily focuses on microalgae and has researched specific areas including cell biology, systematics and evolution, and the development of biotechnologies. He has published more than 240 refereed research papers and book articles, edited several books, including the Handbook of Protoctista (1990). He also authored German textbooks including General Botany (1974, 1984) and Illustrated Guide to Freshwater Algae (2004, 2012).

Melkonian studied the structure, function and development of the flagellar apparatus in algae and co-discovered several centrosomal proteins novel for eukaryotes (e.g. centrin, SF-assemblin). He further provided evidence that flagellar development in unicellular eukaryotes extends over more than one cell cycle generating flagella with different functions in the same cell. Through the study of the biogenesis of extracellular scales in green algae led to the revival of the cisternal maturation model of intra-Golgi apparatus. Studies on the eyespot apparatus of green algae led to the identification of the photoreceptor channelrhodopsin.

Melkonian also studied the systematics, diversity and evolution of algae with emphasis on green algae, cryptophytes, and euglenophytes but also heterotrophic protists, such as the Picozoa. Molecular phylogenetic analyses helped to identify the flagellate Mesostigma as the earliest divergence in the Streptophyta and the Zygnematophyceae as the likely sister group to the embryophyte land plants. Melkonian also worked on early research understanding the cercozoan photosynthetic amoeba Paulinella chromatophora, which has an independently evolved chloroplast called a chromatophore, and is an important example for the evolution of endosymbiotic organelles.

Additionally, his group developed a novel technique to grow microalgae at technical scale immobilized on Twin-Layers.

== Activity in International Organizations ==
- 1992–1994 - President, International Society for Evolutionary Protistology
- 1993–1994 - Vice-President, British Phycological Society
- 1996 - Organizer of the First European Phycological Congress
- 2002–2004 - President, International Phycological Society
- 2011–2012 - Vice-President, International Society of Protistologists
- 1998–present - Editor-in-Chief Emeritus Protist

== Academic Memberships ==
- 2003 - elected as a Corresponding Member of the Botanical Society of America
- 2014 - Honorary Member, Hellenic Phycological Society

== Awards ==
- 1984 - Biology Prize, Göttingen Academy of Sciences
- 2004 - Fritz Schaudinn Award for the best original paper published during 2002 and 2003 in the journal Protist
- 2014 - Hans-Adolf von Stosch Medal, Section of Phycology (German Botanical Society), for outstanding service to Phycology in Germany

== Selected books ==
- Algal Cell Motility
- Allgemeine Botanik. Nach einer Vorlesung von H. Drawert
- Handbook of Protoctista: The Structure, Cultivation, Habitats and Life Histories of the Eukaryotic, Microorganisms and Their Descendants Exclusive O (The Jones and Bartlett series in life sciences)
- Der Kosmos-Algenführer
