= Pierre Augustin Dangeard =

French botanist and mycologist (1862–1947)

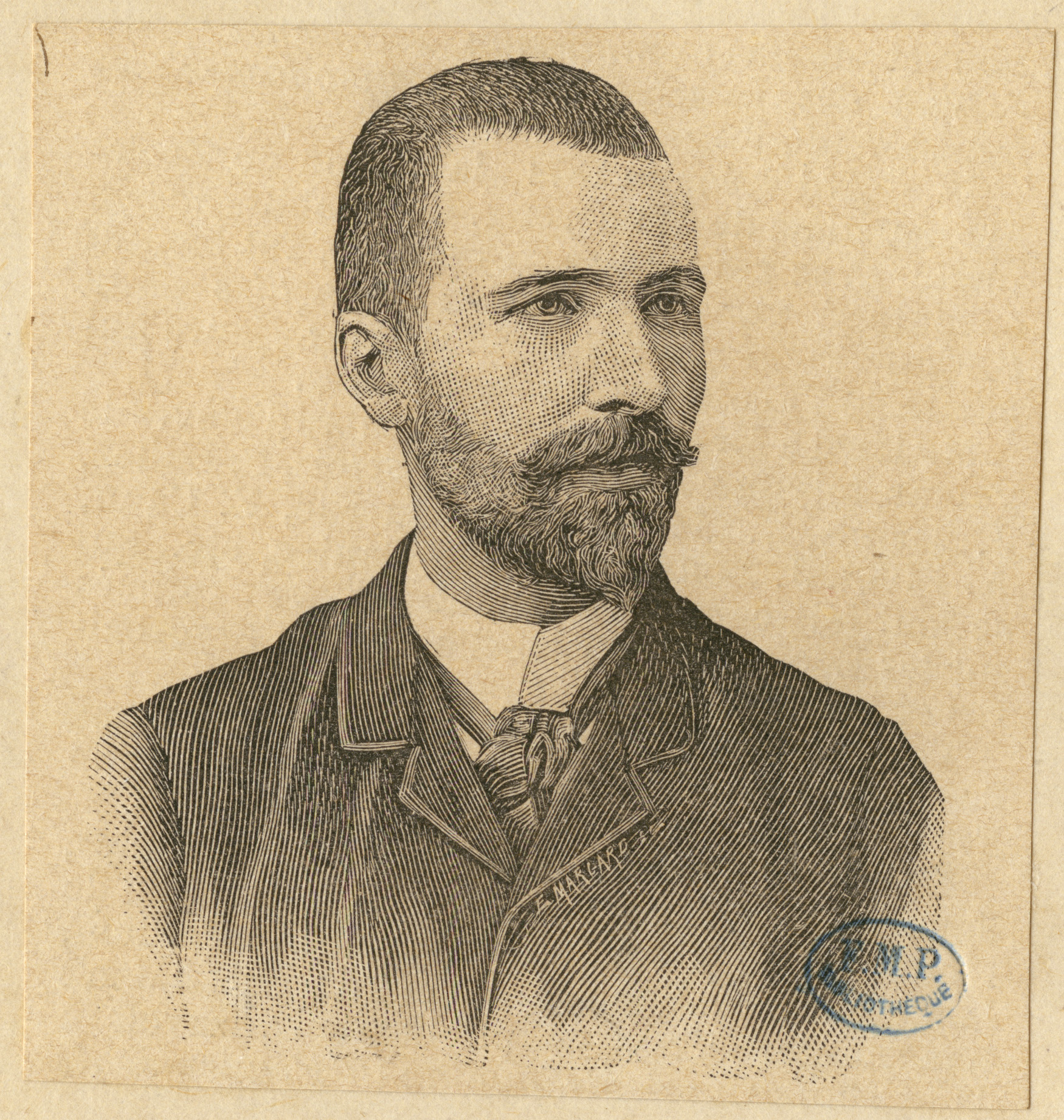
Pierre Augustin Dangeard

Pierre Clement Augustin Dangeard (23 November 1862, Ségrie – 10 November 1947, Ségrie) was a botanist and mycologist known for his investigations of sexual reproduction in fungi. He was the father of botanist Pierre Dangeard (1895–1970) and geologist Louis Dangeard (1898–1987).

Beginning in 1883, he worked as a préparateur to the faculty at Caen, earning his doctorate in 1886. Following graduation, he served as chief of travaux de botanique. In 1891 he was appointed associate professor of botany at the University of Poitiers, later relocating to Paris as a lecturer at the faculty of sciences. In 1921 he attained the title of professor in Paris.

In 1887 he founded the scientific journal Le Botaniste. He was the member of several learned societies, such as the Académie des sciences (1917), the Société botanique de France (president 1914–18) and the Société mycologique de France. He was the circumscriber of the mycological genus Amoebophilus.

He was honoured in 1899, when botanists Pier Andrea Saccardo and Paul Sydow published Dangeardiella, which is a genus of fungi in the class Dothideomycetes.

== Published works ==
- Mémoire sur la reproduction sexuelle des Basidiomycètes, in Le Botaniste 4 pp. 119–181. (1894) – Report on sexual reproduction in Basidiomycetes.
- La reproduction sexuelle des Ascomycètes, in Le Botaniste 4:1 pp. 21–58. (1894) – Sexual reproduction of Ascomycetes.
- Les ancêtres des champignons supérieurs, in Le Botaniste 9 pp. 1 – 263, (1903) – The ancestors of the higher fungi.
- Recherches sur le développement du périthèce chez les Ascomycètes, in Le Botaniste 9 pp. 59–303 (1907) – Research on the development of the perithecium in Ascomycetes.
- L'origine du périthèce chez les Ascomycètes, in Le Botaniste 10 pp. 1 – 385, (1907) – The origin of the perithecium in Ascomycetes.
- Observations sur la famille des Labyrinthulées et sur quelques autres parasites des Cladophora, in Le Botaniste 24:3 pp. 217 – 258, (1932) – Observations on the family Labyrinthules and some other parasites of Cladophora.
