= Pierre Dangeard =

French botanist (1895–1970)

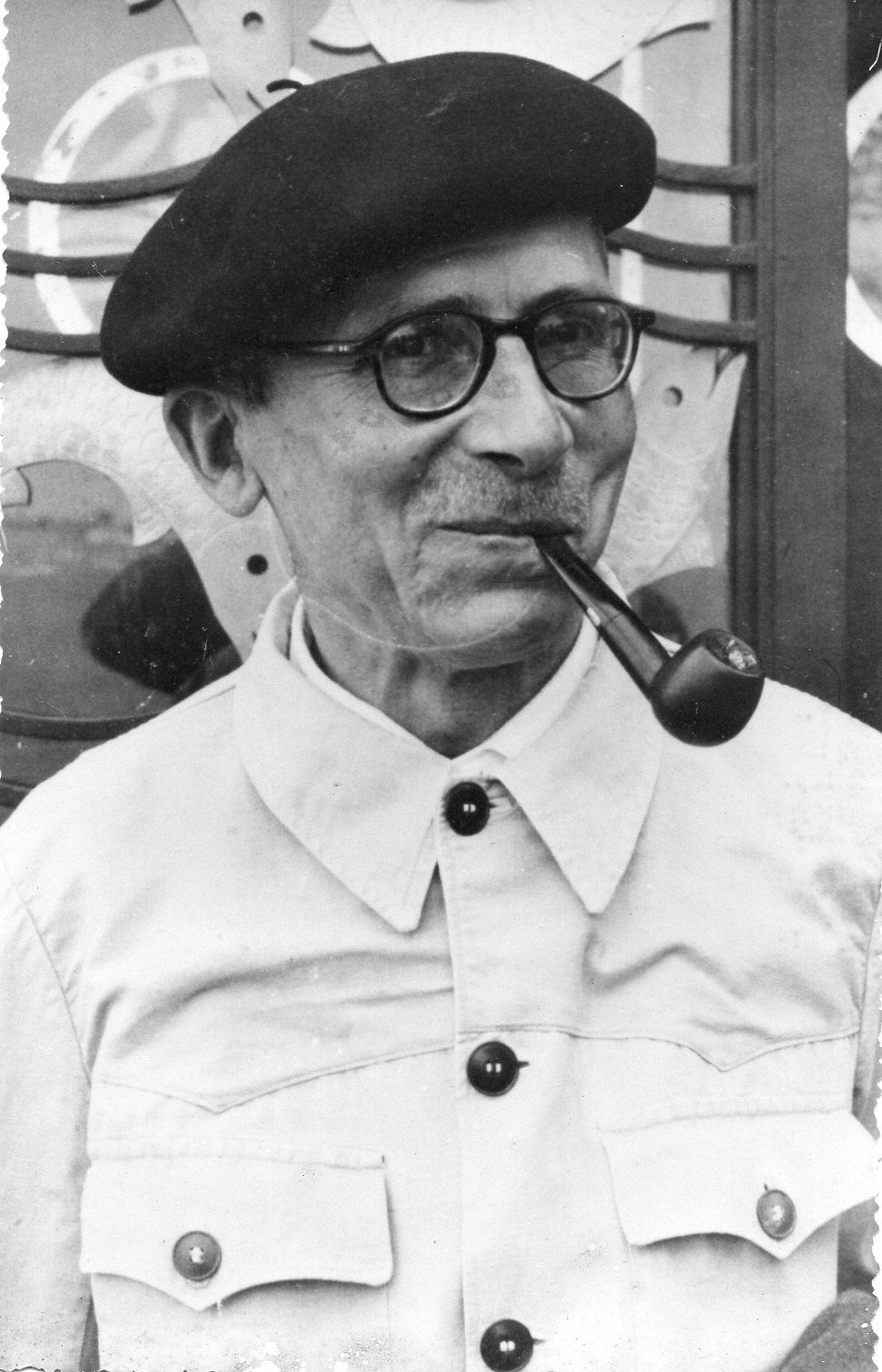
- Pierre Dangeard
- Born: 18 February 1895; Poitiers, France
- Died: 23 August 1970; Pléneuf-Val-André, France
- Education: University of Paris
- Known for: studies on marine algae
- Scientific career
- Fields: Botany
- Workplaces: University of Paris; University of Bordeaux
- Author abbrev. (botany): P.J.L.Dang.

Pierre Jean-Louis Dangeard (18 February 1895 in Poitiers, France – 23 August 1970 in Pléneuf-Val-André, France) was a French botanist. He was the son of botanist and mycologist Pierre Augustin Dangeard and brother of geologist and oceanographer, Louis Dangeard.

== Biography ==
Pierre Dangeard was born on 18 February 1895 in Poitiers, France. Four years earlier his father had relocated from Caen to take up a botany professorship at the Académie des Sciences, the scientific faculty of the University of Poitiers, and a year after his move, had married the 20-year-old Henriette Louise Labrosse. Dangeard was the second of four siblings. His elder brother Henri died in 1899 at the age of six. Pierre thus became the eldest of the children and followed in his father's footsteps to become a botanist.

In 1909 the family moved to Paris after Dangeard's father was offered and accepted a position at the prestigious Académie des Sciences. After receiving a baccalaureate, Dangeard began to study biology at the University of Paris. In 1914 he finished with the license. From 1915 to 1918 Dangeard fought in the First World War and was wounded. In 1922 he was appointed a member of the Legion of Honor. After his military service and his recovery Dangeard continued his nature studies. In 1923 he received a doctorate and published his doctoral thesis in his father's magazine Le Botaniste.

In October 1924 Dangeard was married to Madeleine Colin (1899–1944). They had one daughter, Geneviéve. However, Colin wife died in 1944. Three years later, in March 1947, Dangeard married again, this time to Anne Marie Coville (1908–1998) with whom he had a son, Bernard.

After earning his PhD, Dangeard remained in Paris and in 1928 received an appointment as an assistant at the Faculty of Science, later graduating to a professorship chair of botany in 1932 at the Faculte des Sciences of the University of Bordeaux. Dangeard specialized in marine algae. He took part in various marine expeditions conducted by Jean Charcot and his research vessel Pourquoi pas?. He is thought to have worked closely with his brother, geologist and oceanographer Louis Dangeard, who also took part in marine expeditions.

After his retirement from the chair of the Department of Botany at Bordeaux University, Dangeard lived in Pléneuf-Val-André, Brittany. He died on 23 August 1970 at the age of 75.

== Memberships and honors ==
Dangeard was member of such scientific societies as:

- 1922 Member of the Légion d'honneur
- 1929 Prix Montagne
- 1935 Prix Desmazières Acad. Sci.
- 1948 Corresponding member of the French Academy of Sciences
- 1964 Member of the French Academy of Sciences

In 2002, botanist Thomas Friedl and Charles J. O'Kelly, circumscribed Dangemannia, which is a genus of green algae in the family Oltmannsiellopsidaceae. Also Neodangemannia (also in the family Oltmannsiellopsidaceae), was published in 2014.

== Works and collection ==
In succession to his father, who died in 1947, Pierre Dangeard was editor of the botanic journal Le Botanist.

- Plant collection and types: at Bordeaux

== Notes ==
Not only were father and son both botanists, but in addition they had the same first name, namely Pierre. This led to confusion, even within the academic community. The elder Dangeard foresaw the name problem and confronted it on the occasion of his publishing his son's thesis in the journal Le Botaniste:

„Je suis heureux de présenter aujourd’hui dans cette 15 série du Botaniste un mémoire de mon fils ainé, dont les travaux ultérieurs porteront comme celui-ci la signature Pierre Dangeard, alors que les miens ont toujours été présentés sous la signature P. A. Dangeard : de la sorte, aucune confusion ne pourra se produire dans l’esprit des lecteurs.“

(I am glad to present now in this 15th volume of the Botanist a treatise by my elder son, whose future works, like the present paper, will appear under the signature of Pierre Dangeard, while my own have always been published under that of P. A. Dangeard: thus, no confusion should arise in readers' minds.)
