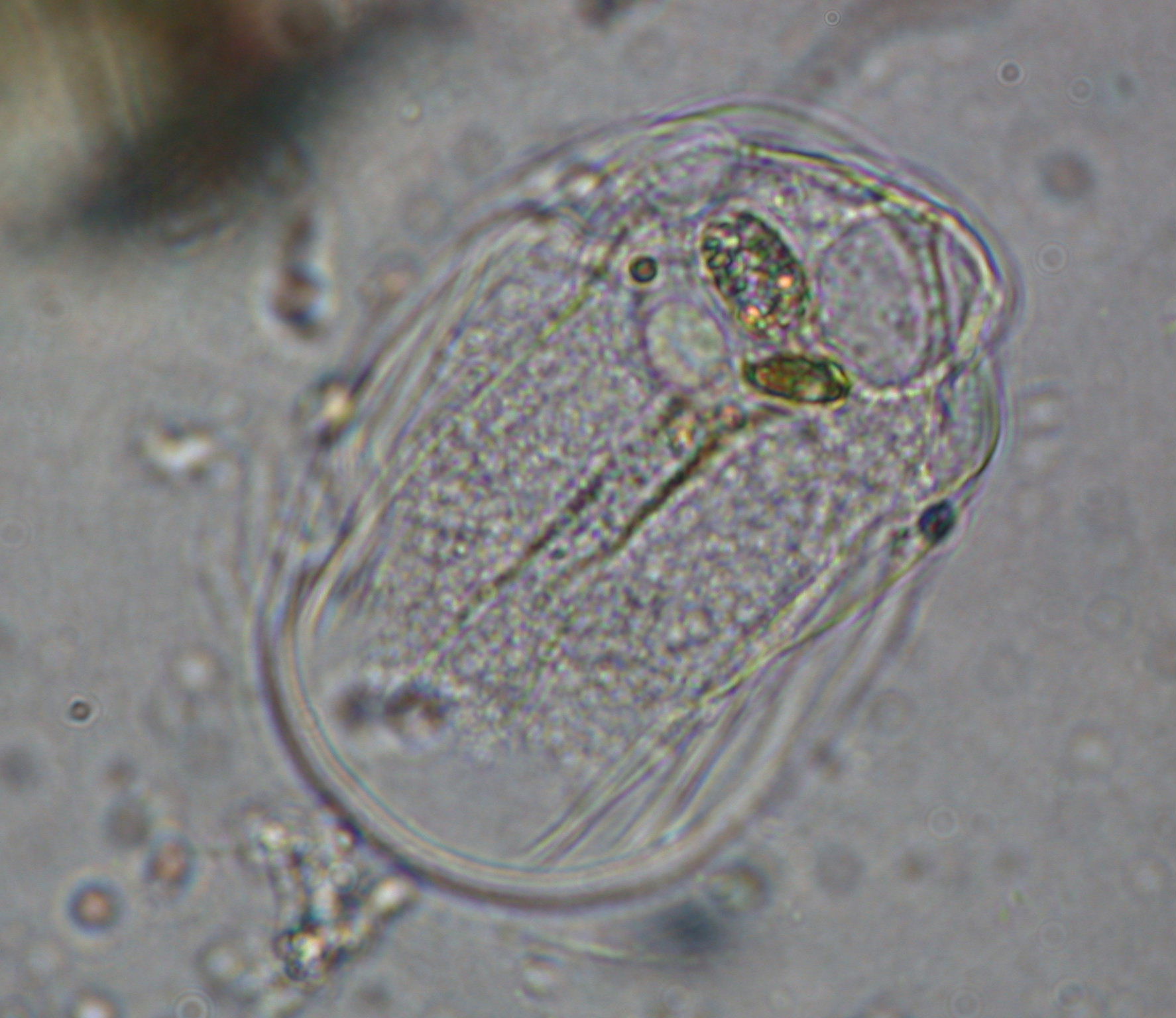
- Thecamoeba striata

Scientific classification
- Domain: Eukaryota
- Phylum: Amoebozoa
- Class: Discosea
- Order: Thecamoebida
- Family: Thecamoebidae; Chatton 1925 em. Smirnov et al. 2011

Genera
- Pseudothecamoeba; Stratorugosa; Thecochaos; Thecamoeba

Synonyms
- Striamoebidae Jahn, Bovee & Griffith 1974

= Thecamoebidae =

Family of amoebae

Thecamoebidae is an Amoebozoa family.

Dermamoeba has been classified in this group. However, there is recent evidence that it is not closely related to the other members of this group.

== See also ==
- Sappinia diploidea
