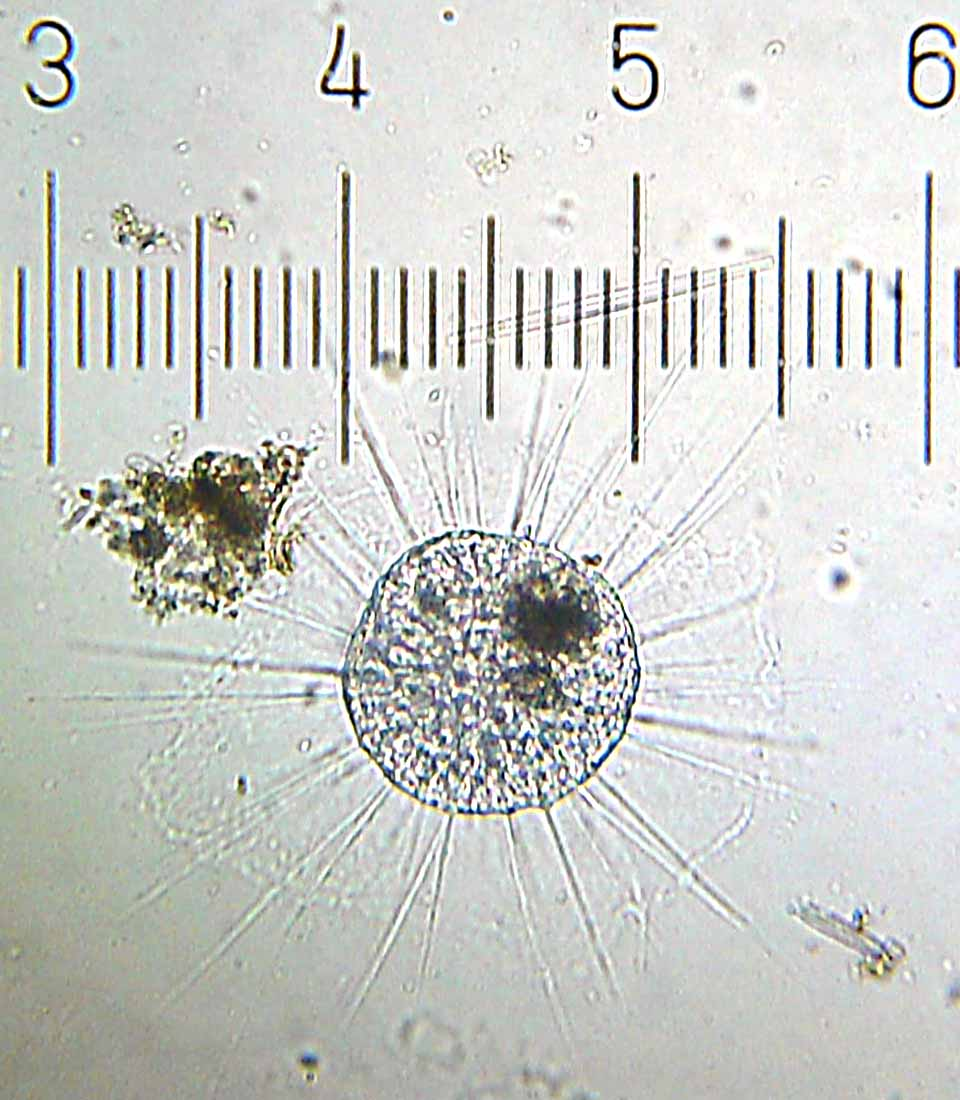
- An actinophryid

Scientific classification
- Domain: Eukaryota
- Clade: Diaphoretickes
- Clade: SAR
- Clade: Stramenopiles
- Phylum: Gyrista
- Subphylum: Ochrophytina
- Class: Dictyochophyceae
- Subclass: Pedinellia; Cavalier-Smith 1986 stat. nov. 2017

Genera
- Dictyochales/Silicoflagellates; Dictyocha; Rhizochromulinales; Rhizochromulina; Actinodines; Pedinellales; Pedinella; Apedinella; Pseudopedinella; Mesopedinella; Parapedinella; Actinomonas; Pteridomonas; Ciliophrys; Actinophryida; Actinophrys; Actinosphaerium; Florenciellales; Pseudochattonella

Synonyms
- Actinochrysea Cavalier-Smith 1995; Axodines Patterson, 1994

= Axodine =

Axodines

Class of single-celled organisms

The axodines are a group of unicellular stramenopiles that includes silicoflagellate and rhizochromulinid algae, actinomonad heterotrophic flagellates and actinophryid heliozoa. Alternative classifications treat the dictyochophytes as heterokont algae, or as Chrysophyceae. Other overlapping taxonomic concepts include the Actinochrysophyceae, Actinochrysea or Dictyochophyceae sensu lato. The grouping was proposed on the basis of ultrastructural similarities, and is consistent with subsequent molecular comparisons.

The Axodine grouping was unusual in breaking with the traditions of botanical and protozoological taxonomy to include the actinophryid heliozoa as part of the lineage that also contained the pedinellid algae along with colorless relatives such as Actinomonas, Pteridomonas, and Ciliophrys; the axodines further included the silicoflagellates, and Rhizochromulinales. This followed a growing consensus that the actinophryid heliozoa were not related to other types of heliozoa.

== Characteristics ==
The name points to a character that is deemed to be synapomorphic for the group: that is the microtubular arrays that extend from the surface of the nucleus. Many flagellated forms have a single emergent flagellum, that lacks the root structure found in related chrysophytes.

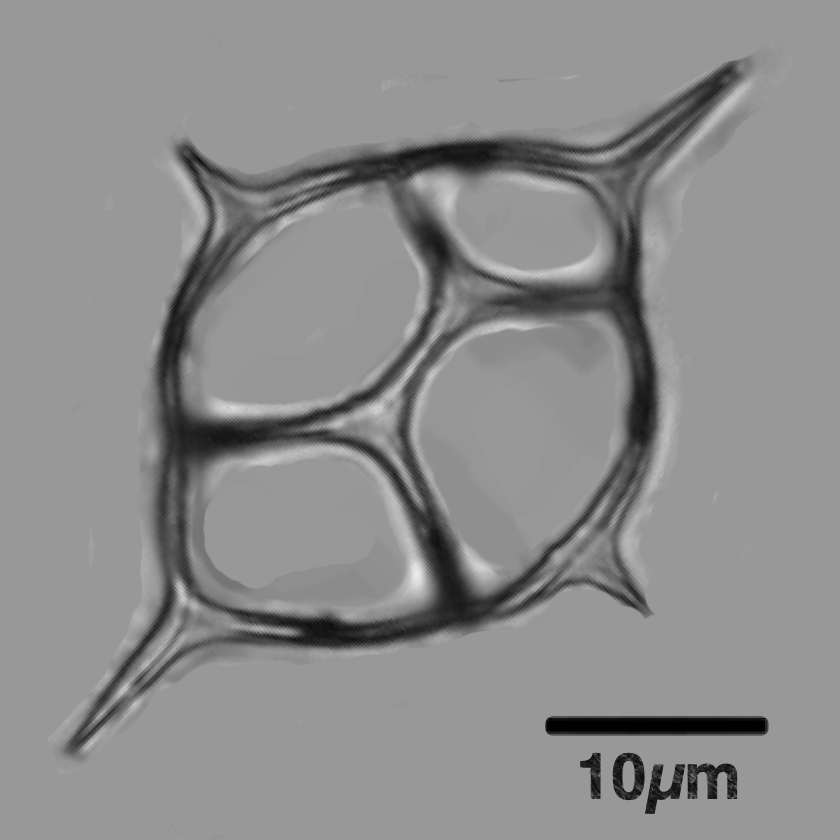
Siliceous skeleton of the dictyochid flagellate, Dictyocha fibula

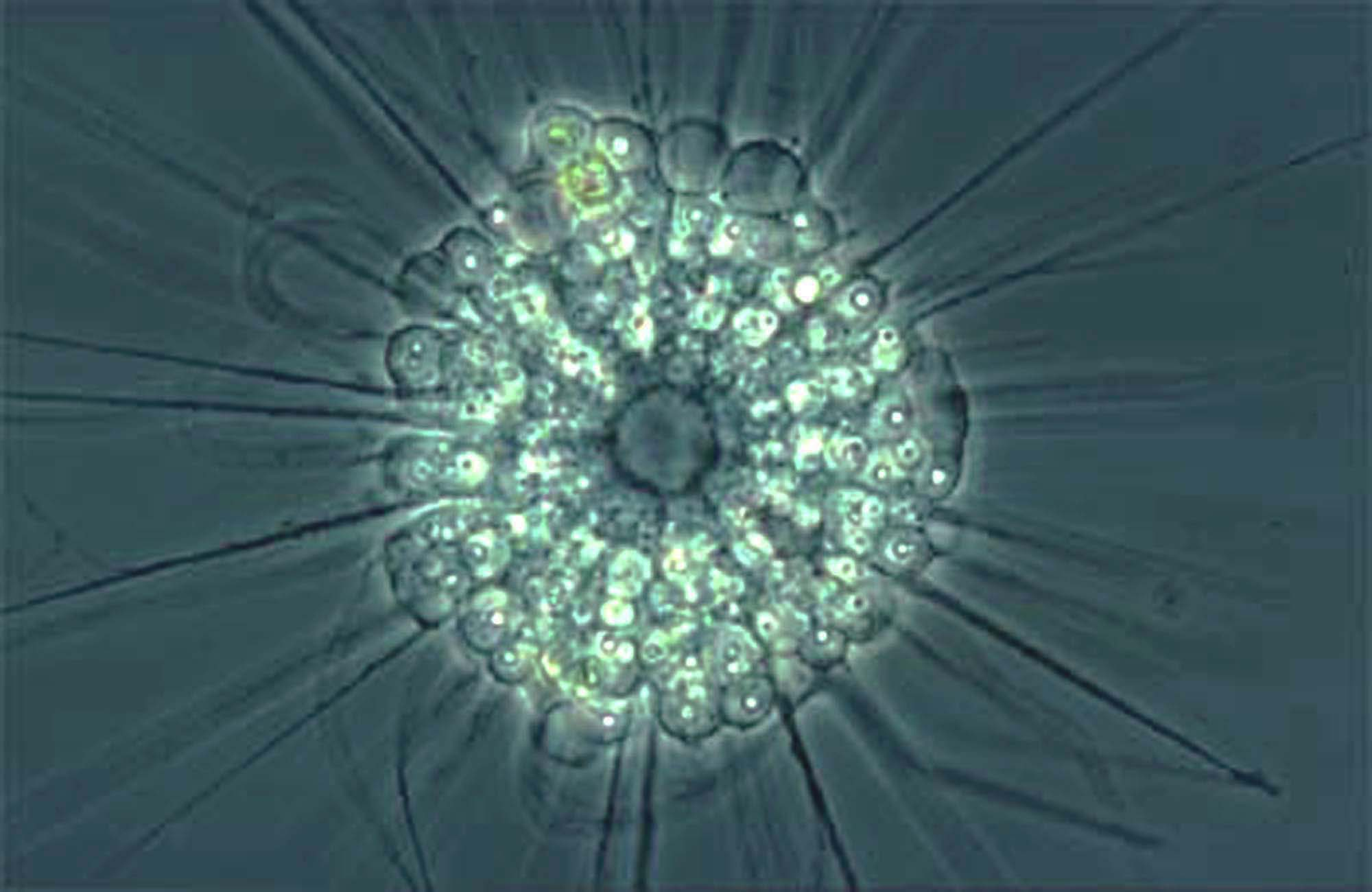
Actinophrys sol, living heliozoon

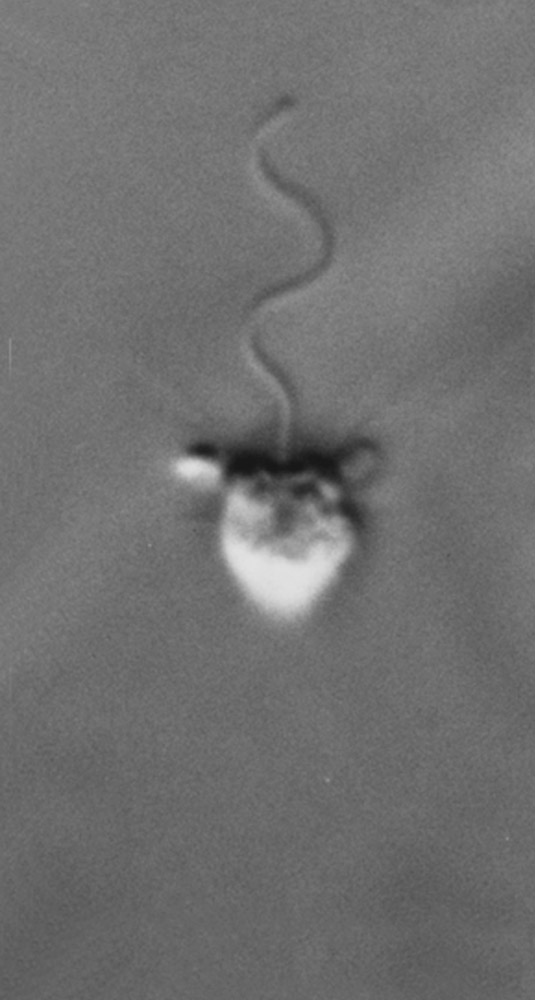
Actinomonas - heterotrophic flagellate with single flagellum and stiff arms

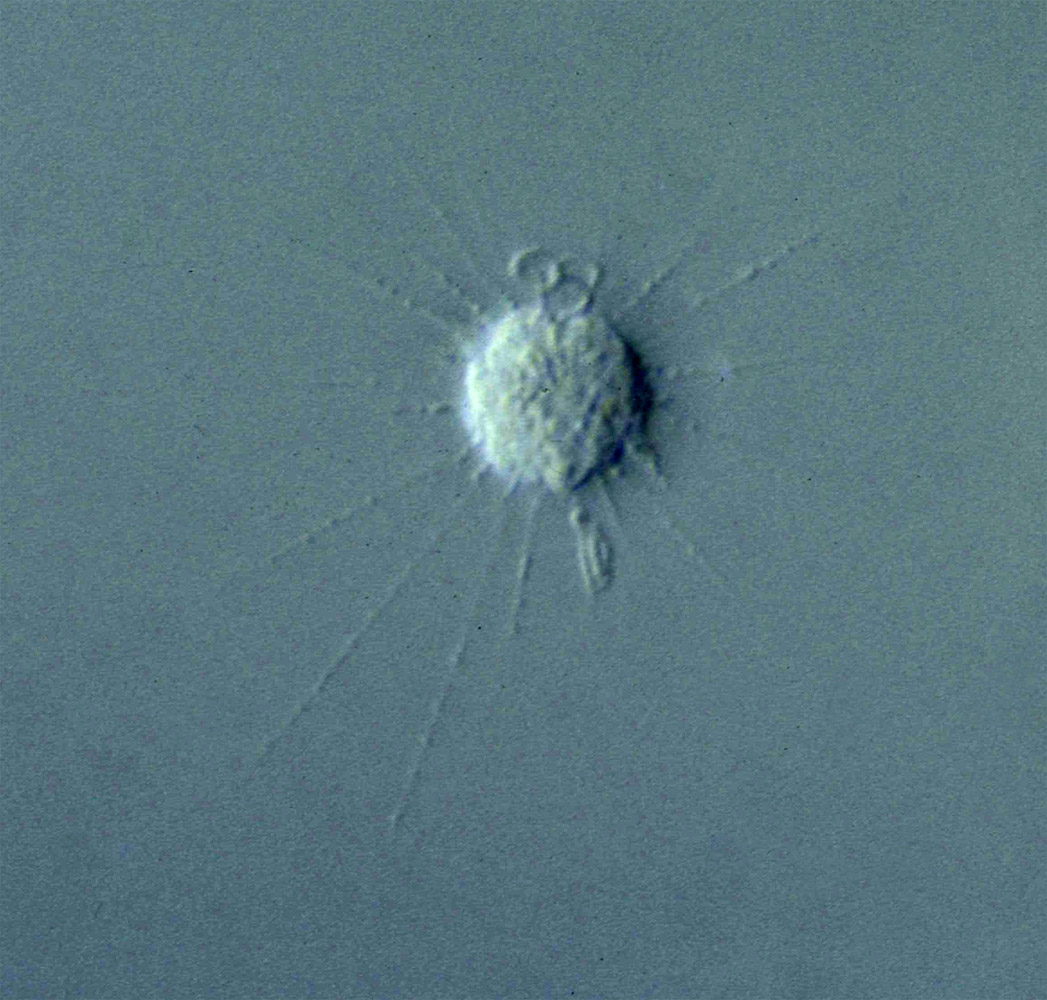
Ciliophrys infusionum, living flagellate

== Classification and history ==
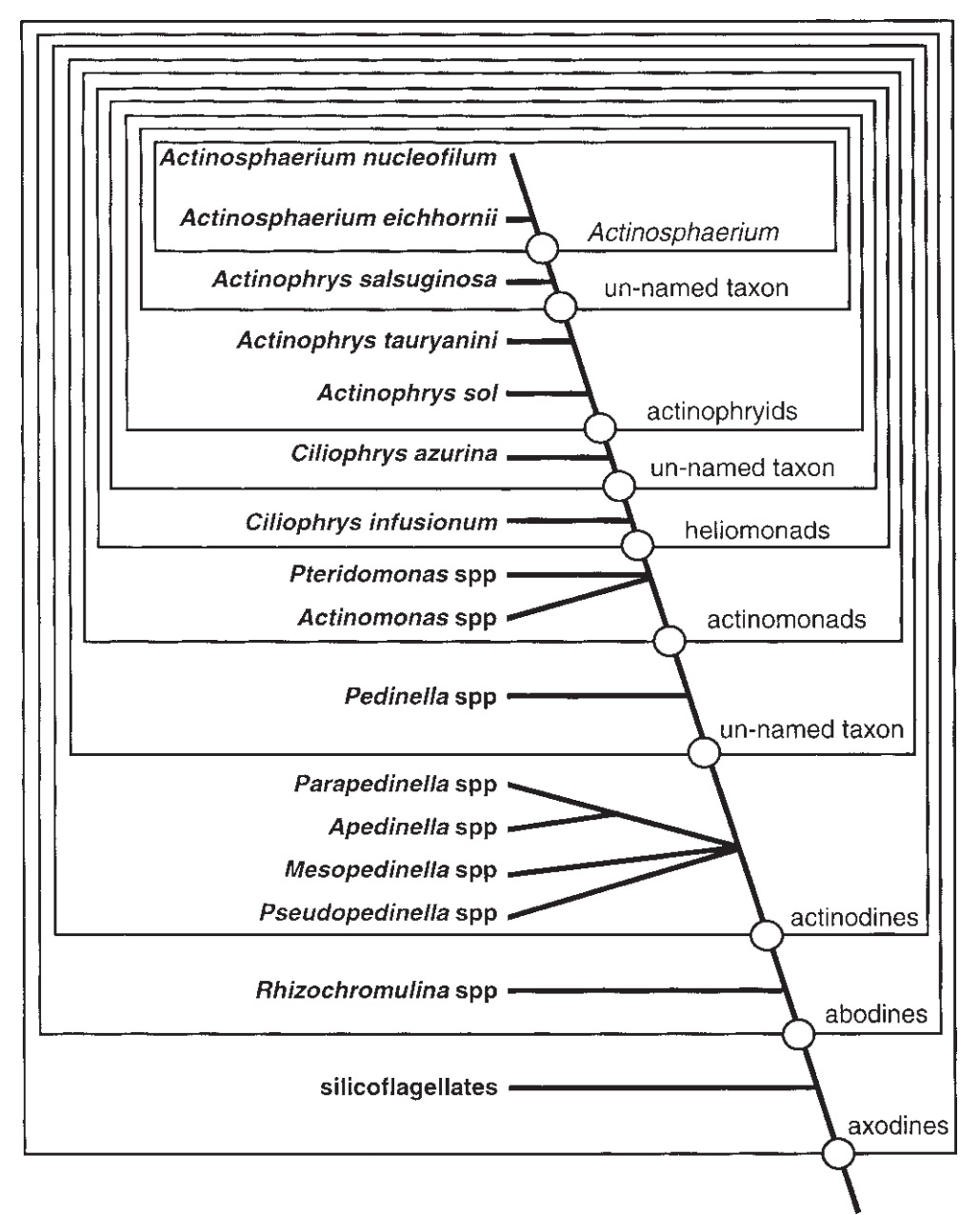
Diagram by Mikrjukov and Patterson to show the relationships of, and within, axodines, together with the proposed synapomorphies of the clades.

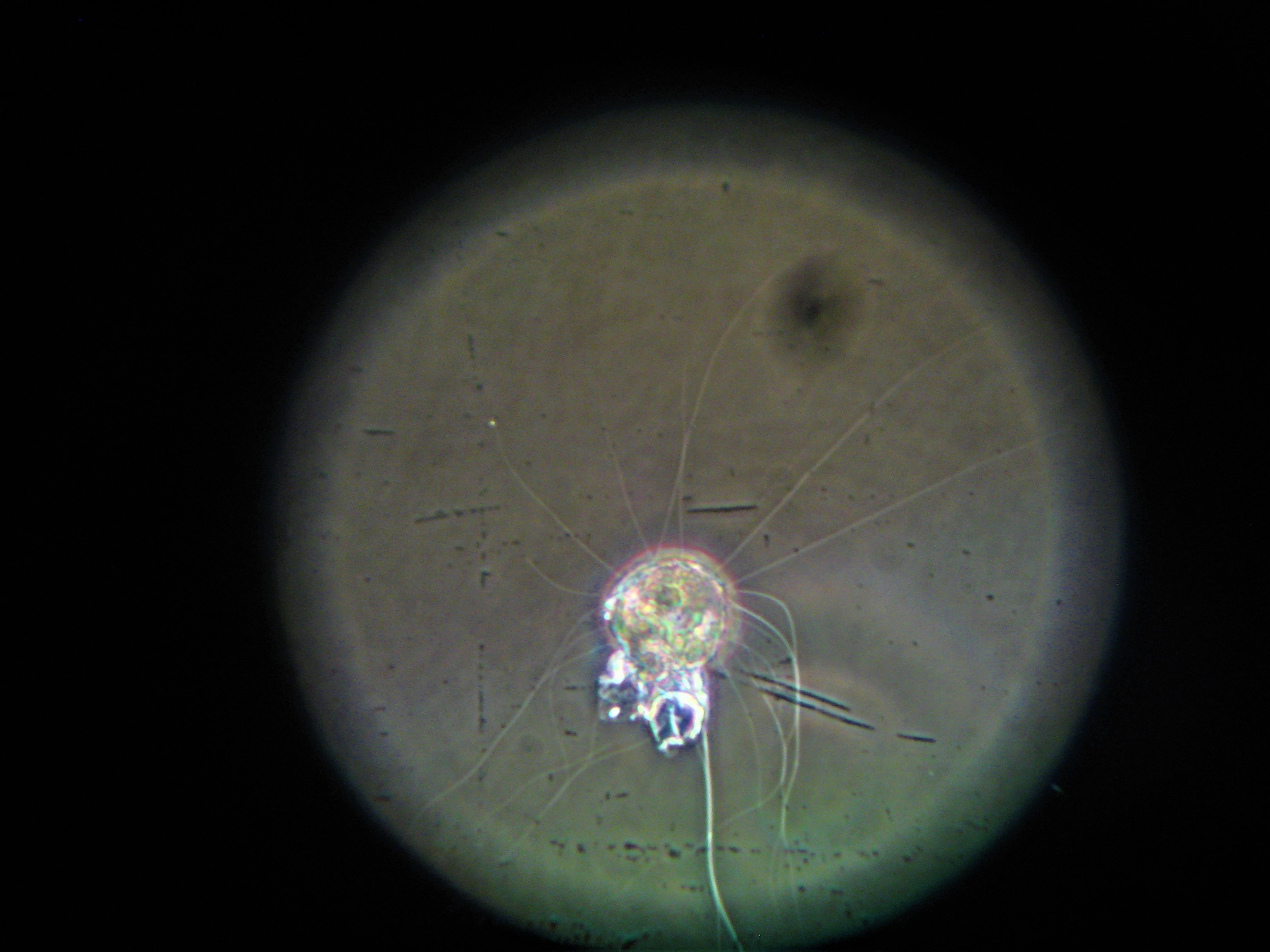

The traditional botanical treatment of the group follows

=== Order Dictyochales ===
The most notable group is the silicoflagellates, marine plankton that form siliceous skeletons and are well known as fossils.

=== Order Pedinellales ===
Most other axodines form a group variously called the pedinellids.

=== Order Rhizochromulinales ===
In addition to the silicoflagellates and actinodines, the marine amoeboid Rhizochromulina marina is included here based on the structure of its zoospores. It is considered closer to the latter group than the former.
