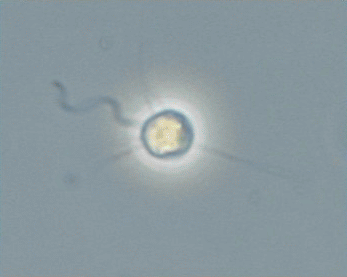
- Light micrograph of Pteridomonas danica

Scientific classification
- Domain: Eukaryota
- Clade: Sar
- Clade: Stramenopiles
- Division: Ochrophyta
- Class: Dictyochophyceae
- Order: Pedinellales; Zimmermann, Moestrup & Hallfors 1985
- Family: Actinomonadaceae; Kent 1880

Genera
- Actinomonas; Apedinella; Cyrtophora; Helicopedinella; Mesopedinella; Palatinella; Parapedinella; Pedinella; Pseudopedinella; Pteridomonas

Synonyms
- As class: Pedinellea (ICZN) Cavalier-Smith, 1986; Pedinellophyceae (ICN) Cavalier-Smith, 1986; As subclass: Pedinellidae Cavalier-Smith, 1995; As order: Ciliophryida (ICZN) Febvre-Chevalier 1985; Ciliophryales (ICN) Cavalier-Smith, 1995; As suborder: Actinomonadineae Cavalier-Smith 2006; Ciliophryineae Febvre-Chevalier ex Cavalier-Smith, 2006; As family: Apedinellaceae Cavalier-Smith, 1995; Cyrtophoraceae Pascher, 1911; Pedinellidae (ICZN) Pascher, 1910; Pedinellaceae (ICN) Pascher, 1910 orthog. emend. Cavalier-Sith, 1995; Ciliophryidae (ICZN) Poche, 1913; Ciliophryaceae (ICN) Poche, 1913 orthog. emend. Cavalier-Smith, 1995

= Pedinellales =

Order of single-celled organisms

Pedinellales (ICN) or Pedinellida (ICZN) is a group of single-celled algae found in both marine environments and freshwater.

These are found in both freshwater and marine environments, and most genera are sessile, attached by posterior stalks. The flagellum is at the anterior of the cell, and the tentacles surround it, often capturing small prey drawn in by its current. The colored genera are Pedinella, Apedinella, Pseudopedinella, and Mesopedinella. Several more genera have lost their chloroplasts and feed entirely by phagocytosis. These are Parapedinella, Actinomonas, and Pteridomonas.

It also appears that certain heliozoa are actually derived pedinellids. Ciliophrys alternates between a mobile flagellate stage and a heliozoan feeding stage, where the body is contracted with extended axopods all over its surface, and the flagellum is curled up into a tight figure eight. The actinophryids, Actinophrys and Actinosphaerium, exist only in a heliozoan form with no flagellum and with more elaborate bundles of microtubules supporting their axopods. Their inclusion was argued by Mikrjukov and Patterson, who coined the term actinodine to refer specifically to this extended group.

Pedinellids were classified as heliozoans by some authors. The colored pedinellids were originally treated as a family of golden algae in the order Ochromonadales, promoted to an order Pedinellales by Zimmerman in 1984. Their relationship to the silicoflagellates became apparent some time later, and Patterson defined this rankless group for the two in 1994. Moestrup treated it as the class Dictyochophyceae, previously restricted to the silicoflagellates, while Cavalier-Smith defined a new class Actinochrysophyceae for them.

== Systematics ==
=== Taxonomic history ===
Pedinellids have been known since the 19th century, but were classified as either algae or heliozoan protozoa due to the absence of chloroplasts in some species. Before the taxonomic revisions that took place in the late 20th century, pedinellids were treated as a single family Pedinellaceae, described in 1910 by Pascher. Some authors classified pedinellids within the order Ochromonadales, together with a variety of unrelated heterokonts such as Synuraceae and Bicosoecaceae, as part of the class Chrysophyceae or golden algae. In 1985, phycologists Birthe Zimmermann, Øjvind Moestrup and Guy Hällfors classified them as an independent order, Pedinellales. The same year, John J. Lee and coauthors segregated the phagotrophic (i.e. without chloroplasts) pedinellids as a different order Ciliophryida under the polyphyletic class Heliozoea. Other authors, such as Thomas Cavalier-Smith, went a step further and proposed treating pedinellids as a separate class, under the name of Pedinellea (spelt Pedinellophyceae under botanical nomenclature).

In 1995, Charles J. O'Kelly and Daniel E. Wujek classified the Dictyochophyceae in three orders: Rhizochromulinales (containing the sole genus Rhizochromulina), Pedinellales (containing all pedinellids) and Dictyochales (silicoflagellates), separating them from golden algae. Simultaneously, Cavalier-Smith proposed a slightly different classification where he created a new class Actinochrysea to embrace these three groups, avoiding the usage of Dictyochophyceae as a name. He considered pedinellids as subclass Pedinellidae, with two orders: Pedinellales (with chloroplasts), containing the families Pedinellaceae and Apedinellaceae; and Ciliophryales (without chloroplasts), containing Actinomonadaceae and Ciliophryaceae. The remaining two groups, Rhizochromulinales and Dictyochales, were transferred to a separate subclass Dictyochidae. The next year, Cavalier-Smith and Ema E. Chao recognized that the chloroplast losses were polyphyletic, and the family Actinomonadaceae was transferred to Pedinellales on the basis of a molecular phylogenetic analysis.

In 2006, Cavalier-Smith once again rearranged the classification. He lowered Actinochrysea to a subclass Actinochrysia within a new class Hypogyristea, which also included pelagophytes as subclass Pelagophycia. He lumped together all pedinellid genera in the family Actinomonadaceae and new suborder Actinomonadineae, with the exception of Ciliophrys, which he included with the non-pedinellid Rhizochromulina in two families of a new suborder Ciliophryineae. He maintained this classification in later years. In 2018, he finally recognized class Dictyochophyceae, and created the subclass Pedinellia or Pedinellophycidae (equivalent to his earlier Actinochrysea/Actinochrysia) to lump together pedinellids and silicoflagellates. Pelagophytes remained under the subclass Pelagophycidae, and two genera of more uncertain placement under a third subclass Sulcophycidae: Olisthodiscus and Sulcochrysis.

Cavalier-Smith's taxonomic scheme is not accepted by the scientific community. Instead, Moestrup's 1995 classification is more commonly supported, where pedinellids are all contained in the order Pedinellales, rendering Ciliophryales a junior synonym. They are considered part of Dictyochophyceae, along with orders Dictyochales (silicoflagellates), Rhizochromulinales (Rhizochromulina), and a more recent fourth order Florenciellales. In addition, pelagophytes are rejected as members of Dictyochophyceae, and instead form an independent class Pelagophyceae. Within pedinellids, there have been several attempts to establish different families according to morphological data such as the presence or absence of stalks and chloroplasts. However, molecular analyses do not support these internal divisions. Consequently, all pedinellids have been grouped into a single family, Actinomonadaceae, which has taxonomic preference due to being the earliest described, and all other proposed families (Pedinellaceae, Apedinellaceae, etc.) have become junior synonyms.

History of pedinellid classification
Cavalier-Smith (1995)			Cavalier-Smith (2006)			Present		Includes
Pedinellidae	Pedinellales	Pedinellaceae	Pedinellales	Actinomonadineae	Actinomonadaceae	Pedinellales	Actinomonadaceae	Pedinella
Pedinellidae	Pedinellales	Pedinellaceae	Pedinellales	Actinomonadineae	Actinomonadaceae	Pedinellales	Actinomonadaceae	Pseudopedinella
Pedinellidae	Pedinellales	Apedinellaceae	Pedinellales	Actinomonadineae	Actinomonadaceae	Pedinellales	Actinomonadaceae	Apedinella
Pedinellidae	Ciliophryales	Actinomonadaceae	Pedinellales	Actinomonadineae	Actinomonadaceae	Pedinellales	Actinomonadaceae	Actinomonas
Pedinellidae	Ciliophryales	Actinomonadaceae	Pedinellales	Actinomonadineae	Actinomonadaceae	Pedinellales	Actinomonadaceae	Pteridomonas
Pedinellidae	Ciliophryales	Ciliophryaceae	Pedinellales	Ciliophryineae	Ciliophryaceae	excluded		Ciliophrys
excluded			Pedinellales	Ciliophryineae	Rhizochromulinaceae	excluded		Rhizochromulina

=== Classification ===
Pedinellids currently sum the following genera:

- Actinomonas Kent 1880
- Apedinella Throndsen 1971
- Cyrtophora Strand 1929
- Helicopedinella Sekiguchi et al. 2003
- Mesopedinella Daugbjerg 1996
- Palatinella Lauterborn 1906
- Parapedinella Pedersen, Beech & Thomsen 1986
- Pedinella Wyssotzki 1887 non Dahl 1909
- Pseudopedinella Carter 1937
- Pteridomonas Penard 1889
