= Aureoumbra lagunensis =

Scientific classification
- Domain: Eukaryota
- Supergroup: Stramenopiles
- Division: Ochrophyta
- Class: Dictyochophyceae
- Order: Sarcinochrysidales
- Family: Sarcinochrysidaceae
- Genus: Aureoumbra
- Species: A. lagunensis

Binomial name
- Aureoumbra lagunensis D.A.Stockwell, DeYoe, Hargraves & P.W.Johnson

Species of single-celled organism

Aureoumbra lagunensis is a unicellular planktonic marine microalga that belongs to the genus Aureoumbra under the class Pelagophyceae. It is similar in morphology and pigments to Aureococcus anophagefferens and Pelagococcus subviridis. The cell shape is spherical to subspherical and is 2.5 to 5.0 μm in diameter. It is golden-coloured and is encapsulated with extracellular polysaccharide layers and has a single chloroplast structure with pigments.

Aureoumbra lagunensis thrives in a warm hypersaline environment as the greatest cell density has been found in water with salinity higher than 40 PSU and with temperatures between 25–30 °C (77–86 °F). Generally, the density of A. lagunensis is in the order of 10^{6} cells mL^{−1}, being higher in the summer months with lower abundance during the winter.

Aureoumbra lagunensis causes harmful algal blooms and was the dominant microalga in the 7 year long brown tide (1990 - 1997) that happened in Laguna Madre, Texas. Its dominance over other coexisting phytoplankton is in part associated with its encapsulating mucus layer of exopolymer secretions (EPS) and its ability to revert from vegetative and resting cell forms. The A. lagunensis blooms cause a substantial increase in light attenuation, which in turn contributes to marine biodiversity loss, particularly phytoplankton communities and benthic invertebrates. A. lagunensis thrives in low-light conditions, where it can maintain high growth rates at 150 umol photons m^{−2} s^{−1}, thus an increase in light attenuation causes a positive feedback which further perpetuates blooms.

Aureoumbra lagunensis nutrient uptake is unlike other common microalgae. It uptakes inorganic nitrogen in the form of ammonium (NH_{4}^{+}) and nitrite (NO_{2}^{−}) and organic nitrogen in the form of urea, but does not utilize nitrate (NO_{3}^{−}). It uses environment dissolved organic phosphorus as the sole source to regenerate phosphate for growth.

== Nomenclature ==
The name Aureoumbra lagunensis is Latin derived, where "Aureo" comes from the word Aureus meaning golden, pertaining to the colour of A. lagunensis populations; umbra refers to the reduction in light penetration that occurs when blooms occur, and lagunensis refers to the lagoon environment, namely Laguna Madre, Texas, from which this organism was first isolated.

== Pigment characterization ==
- Chlorophyll a
- Chlorophyll c
- Fucoxanthin
- Diatoxanthin
- Diadinoxanthin
- 19'-butanoyloxyfucoxanthin
- β,β-Carotene

== Distribution ==
Aureoumbra lagunensis causes harmful algal blooms, most notably in Laguna Madre, Texas from 1990 to 1997, where it was first isolated. For over 20 years, A. lagunensis was confined to this bay system in Texas. More recently, small background concentrations of the species have been found in coastal bay regions along the rest of the Mexican Gulf coast, with larger populations found in Florida, Texas, and Mexico. In 2012 and 2013, A. lagunensis also caused brown tides in the Indian River Lagoon and Mosquito Lagoon, in Florida, USA. A. lagunensis brown tides have expanded as far as the Caribbean Sea into Guantánamo Bay, Cuba in 2013.

=== The Texas brown tide ===
Aureoumbra lagunensis cause a bloom in Laguna Madre, Texas for seven years where it maintained densities from 0.5 million cells/mL to 5 million cells/mL. The hypersaline conditions of Laguna Madre (45 – 75 PSU) is thought to be the cause of the bloom which allowed A. lagunensis to thrive, as they achieve maximal growth at 70 PSU and can continue to grow in environments of 10 – 90 PSU. The development of these hypersaline conditions was due to a period of drought which caused a loss of benthic and planktonic grazers. This effectively reduced the grazing pressure on phytoplankton like A. lagunensis. In December 1990 a large fish die-off occurred upon severe freezing which served to release nutrients like ammonium to further support the phytoplankton population. By October 1997, The Texas Brown Tide was disrupted, after seven years of uninterrupted growth, due to heavy rainfall.

=== The Florida brown tides ===
The first brown tide in Florida began during the summer of 2012 and collapsed a few months thereafter, and the second brown tide began in the spring of 2013 and collapsed in mid-summer 2013. During the brown tides in Florida, A. lagunensis consisted of 98% of the phytoplankton community with abundances greater than 2 million cells/mL. Similar to the causes of the Texas brown tides, the Florida brown tides were proliferated by high salinity, low grazing pressure, high dissolved organic nitrogen and low inorganic nutrients, and competitive advantage over other phytoplankton. However, these brown tides were short-lived compared to that in Texas, lasting no more than a few months.

=== The Cuba brown tide ===
In January 2013, A. lagunensis populations sharply increased in Guantanamo Bay, sparking a brown tide in Cuba. This in turn led to many shutdowns of the plant which supplied freshwater to the US Naval Base in Guantanamo Bay. Similar to the Florida brown tides, this A. lagunensis bloom was short lived compared to that in Texas, only lasting from January 2013 to November 2013. Unlike the Florida and Texas brown tides, hypersalinity was not found in the Caribbean waters where A. lagunensis bloomed. In the Texas and Florida brown tides, high primary productivity was always correlated with high A. lagunensis density, but in Cuba high primary productivity correlated with high A. lagunensis density only initially. After some time, productivity in Cuba remained high, but the dominant phytoplankton shifted from A. lagunensis to Synechococcus sp..

== Competitive advantages ==
Aureoumbra lagunensis has competitive advantages that may allow it to persist in unfavourable marine environments such as low light intensities, nutrient limitations and high temperatures. A. lagunensis has an encapsulating mucus layer of exopolymer secretions (EPS) and is able to revert from vegetative to resting cell forms in unfavorable conditions. Allelopathic effects have also been observed that can cause cell lysis, reduced growth rates and reduced photosynthetic efficiency of co-existing phytoplankton. A. lagunensis experiences low mortality losses via its ability to discourage grazing by zooplankton and filter-feeding mollusks. Positive feedback involved in A. lagunensis’ ability to grow competitively in low-nutrient environments and low light levels and its ability to discourage grazing further contributes to brown tide blooms.

=== The EPS layer ===
The adhesive EPS layer surrounding A. lagunensis reduces grazing by hypotrichous filter-feeding protozoans such as Aspidisca sp and Euplotes, as marked by these protozoan's reduction in growth rate with increasing levels of EPS coating. It is speculated that the effects on grazing may be caused by the adherence of the exopolymer to cilia on the surface of protozoans thus affecting swimming abilities and clogging feeding apparatus, both of which may decrease grazing efficiency.

With increasing salinity, the EPS layer of A. lagunensis increases. It has been hypothesized that with the hypersaline conditions of Laguna Madre during the bloom, A. lagunensis was able to out-compete other organisms due to a reduction in grazing pressure, which allowed it to thrive and further contribute to the Texas Brown Tide.

The polysaccharide sheath is hypothesized to protect A. lagunensis from being digested in the guts of some zooplankton like that of the copepod Acartia tonsa as viable cells can be detected in its fecal pellets.

=== Vegetative and resting cell forms ===
Aureoumbra lagunensis has vegetative and resting cell forms in response to optimal conditions and environmental stressors respectively. Such a capability allows this organism to tolerate nutrient limitations, temperature fluctuations and light intensity variations. Relative to the vegetative form of A. lagunensis, the resting cell is larger, more round, has fewer and more aggregated plastids, lower chlorophyll A concentrations, decreased respiration rates and growth rates, reduced photosynthetic efficiency, greater vacuolar space and lower RNA:DNA ratio due to a decrease in RNA content but not DNA content. Red accumulation bodies have also been observed in resting cells but not vegetative cells. Such accumulation bodies are associated with increased sterol concentrations. Vegetative cells are described as irregularly shaped and containing sterols characterized as (E)-24-propylidenecholesterol, stigmasterol, sitosterol, cholesterol, (24R)-24-propylcholesterol with trace amounts of 24-methylenecholesterol, crinosterol, clerosterol, campesterol, dihydrobrassicasterol, and 24-isopropylcholesterol.

== Loss of biodiversity ==
Brown tides caused by A. lagunensis lead to substantial light attenuation, a loss in intensity of light travelling to the bottom of water. In the Texas Brown tide, the increase in light attenuation caused a decrease in seagrass beds which was abundant prior to the brown tide. This contributed to a loss in biomass in terms of primary producers and in turn the diversity of benthic invertebrates in Laguna Madre. The benthic phototrophs compete with A. lagunensis for nutrients, especially those regenerated in sediments, an important source of recycled nutrient in shallow lagoons that host these blooms. As a result, decrease in benthic biomass further contributes to the dispersion of benthic nutrient input to overlying water, fueling bloom development and causing more severe shading of the bottom water which further limits the growth of benthic phototrophs.

Aureoumbra lagunensis favors a low light environment, thus an increase in light attenuation results in an increase in Aureoumbra populations on surface water which causes more severe shading. A. lagunensis could discourage grazing of zooplankton and filter-feeding mollusks to increase the chance of its survival. Brown tide blooms caused by A. lagunensis decrease the grazing activity, growth and egg release rates of the initially abundant mesozooplankton Acartia tonsa. The dominant clam, Mulinia lateralis, also experienced population declines during the Texas brown tide bloom, however, this decrease in abundance was initiated before the beginning of the bloom. In addition to Mulinia lateralis, the dominant polychaete, Streblospio Benedict, an important grazer of phytoplankton, also decreased in abundance.

== Nitrogen uptake ==
Aureoumbra lagunensis are not able to use nitrate (NO_{3}^{−}) as a sole source of nitrogen and instead utilize inorganic nitrogen in the form of ammonium (NH_{4}^{+}) and nitrite (NO_{2}^{−}) and organic nitrogen in the form of urea.

Aureoumbra lagunensis is found in high abundance where there is high organic to inorganic nitrogen ratios but growth rates of A. lagunensis are greater when grown with ammonium than urea. Collectively, ammonium and urea make up more than 90% of nitrogen uptake in bloom populations. A. lagunensis has higher affinity for and greater productivity with low levels of organic and inorganic nitrogen as opposed to high levels such that they are unable to increase growth rates in high ammonium concentrations (≈40 μM) which can ultimately cause them to be out-competed by Synechococcus species which thrive in such conditions. Low levels of ammonium (≈10uM) has been shown to enhance growth rates of A. lagunensis to a greater degree than phycoerythrin-containing cyanobacteria.

Aureoumbra lagunensis is more productive when utilizing NH_{4}^{+} or NO_{2}^{−} than with NO_{3}^{−}. A. lagunensis’ inability to use NO_{3}^{−} as the sole source of nitrogen is maintained when samples are supplied with iron and other trace metals. When nitrate is in excess the effects on A. lagunensis can be detrimental as it has been found that phycocyanin-containing cyanobacteria can thrive in such environments causing for an increase in its abundance and a decline in A. lagunensis abundance.

Baffin Bay, Texas has seasonally and yearly stable levels of organic and inorganic nitrogen; however, when the large fish die-off occurred in 1990 due to severe freezing, more urea and ammonium became available to A. lagunensis, thus potentially initiating the brown tide.

== Phosphorus uptake ==
Aureoumbra lagunensis blooms at a low phosphorus concentration. It has the ability to regenerate phosphate from environmental dissolved organic phosphorus (DOP), a significant part of marine total dissolved phosphorus pool. It could use DOP as the sole source of phosphate for growth as a result.

The mechanisms of phosphate acquisition in A. lagunensis remain unconfirmed, but it is hypothesized that A. lagunensis uses a common phosphorus-limitation specific protein, alkaline phosphatase, to dephosphorylate DOP compounds to alleviate the low phosphate bioavailability. High alkaline phosphatase activity accompanied with very low dissolved inorganic phosphorus concentration were measured in the A. lagunensis populations in the Texas Brown Tide at Laguna Madre.

Aureoumbra lagunensis is capable of growing under a wide range of N:P ratios, but forms dense blooms when the water column N:P ratio increases to high levels (≈140). In cultures, A.lagunensis have a C:P ratio greater than 2000 when grown under severe phosphorus limiting environment.

== Chloroplast genome ==
The chloroplast genome is non-circular. Strain CCMP1507 has a chloroplast genome size of 94,346 bp, encoding 110 proteins and containing 10 tandem repeats, 8 of which are adjacent to photosynthetic and energy production genes. The genome lacks large inverted repeats commonly found in chloroplast.

Although A. lagunensis is similar to A. anophagefferens, it contains five chloroplast genes psaF, ycf45 and light independent chlorophyll biosynthesis genes chlL, chlN, and chlB which are not present in A. anophagefferens’ chloroplast genome. It is speculated that the presence of the light independent genes for chlorophyll biosynthesis is what allows A.lagunensis to persist in low light intensities.
