= Ciliophrys azurina =

Scientific classification
- Domain: Eukaryota
- Clade: Sar
- Clade: Stramenopiles
- Division: Ochrophyta
- Class: Dictyochophyceae
- Order: Rhizochromulinales
- Genus: Ciliophrys
- Species: C. azurina

Binomial name
- Ciliophrys azurina Patterson in Mikrjukov & Patterson 2001

Synonyms
- Heliorapha azurina (Patterson in Mikrjukov & Patterson 2001) Cavalier-Smith in Scoble & Cavalier-Smith 2013

Species of heliozoan protists

Ciliophrys azurina is a species of heliozoan protists, amoeboid eukaryotes with stiff axopodia radiating from their cells.

== Morphology ==
Ciliophrys azurina is a heliozoan, a unicellular protist with tapering arms called axopodia sustained by axonemes. Cells of C. azurina have a large, prominent cell nucleus containing a central nucleolus surrounded by peripheral clumps of heterochromatin. The cell body measures 15 μm in diameter, with radiating arms that contain extrusomes. Each cell has a single flagellum that appears at the front of swimming cells or, in non-swimming cells (i.e. during feeding), appears tightly curled, typically in a double "8" shape. Both its large size and the length and shape of its flagellum make it similar to Actinophrys, specifically A. pontica.

== Ecology ==
Ciliophrys azurina is a heterotrophic flagellate exclusively found in tropical climates, in both marine and terrestrial habitats. It was isolated from Darwin, Northern Territory, Australia, where it was observed consuming diatoms. It is present in intertidal sediments and surface waters of Darwin. It has also been observed in Ascension Island.

== Systematics ==
Ciliophrys azurina is a species previously assigned to the genus Ciliophrys of the Pedinellales, a heliozoan order assigned to Dictyochophyceae, a class of ochrophytes. It was created in 2001 by biologist David J. Patterson to describe cells collected in 1994 from East Point and Lee Point, Darwin, Northern Territory, Australia. In its initial publication, C. azurina (then Ciliophrys azurina) was considered an "evolutionary link" between the Pedinellales and the order Actinophryida, on the basis of presenting traits previously thought as exclusive to each order. The species differs from other Ciliophrys by the presence of tapering axopodia that are too broad at the base to be sustained solely by a triad of microtubules, a characteristic of Pedinellales. The genus Ciliophrys is now classified in the dictyochophyte order Rhizochromulinales.
