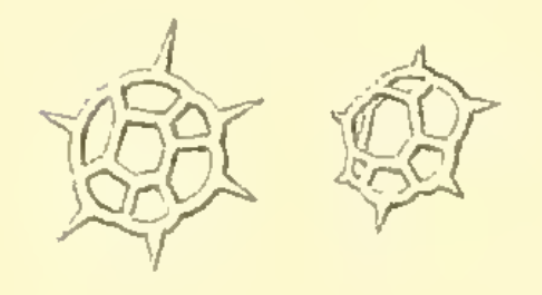
- Illustration of Octactis speculum silica skeletons by Stöhr (1880)

Scientific classification
- Domain: Eukaryota
- Clade: Sar
- Clade: Stramenopiles
- Division: Ochrophyta
- Class: Dictyochophyceae
- Order: Dictyochales
- Family: Dictyochaceae
- Genus: Octactis; Schiller, 1925 emend. F.H.Chang, J.M.Grieve & J.E.Sutherland, 2017

Species
- O. octonaria; O. speculum

= Octactis =

Genus of unicellular protists

Octactis is a genus of silicoflagellates, marine photosynthetic unicellular protists that take the form of either flagellates or axopodial amoebae. Described by Josef Schiller in 1925, Octactis contains various species of marine phytoplankton, some of them responsible for algal blooms that are toxic to fish.

== Characteristics ==
Octactis species are unicellular protists that appear as several different multinucleate forms (i.e. with multiple nuclei). The most prevalent form is as amoebae surrounded by an external, basket-like siliceous skeleton, consisting of two conspicuous rings: a smaller apical ring supported by short struts that are attached to a larger basal ring. The skeleton pikes sometimes occur on the surface of the basal ring. The large window that the apical ring encloses is undivided. Other forms also present are naked amoebae and sometimes mucocyst-bearing amoebae. Both skeleton-bearing and naked cells present a long flagellum. The mucocysts appear on the periphery of skeleton-bearing cells, absent in the naked cells.

Within each Octactis cell there is a pyrenoid embedded within a chloroplast. The chloroplast has a short thylakoid intrusion. The skeleton-bearing cells contain between 6 and 8 Golgi bodies. The chloroplasts contain all three accessory chlorophylls, c_{1}, c_{2} and c_{3}, as well as fucoxanthin as the main carotenoid, with diadinoxanthin and one or two oxyfucoxanthin derivatives. They lack lutein.

== Ecology ==
Octactis species are unicellular algae found in typically cold marine waters as part of the phytoplankton. Like other silicoflagellates, Octactis cells are surrounded by a siliceous skeleton composed of various spikes arranged in specific shapes. One species, O. speculum, is considered harmful for marine fauna, due to appearing in harmful algal blooms that have caused high mortality of fish such as salmon and trout. The silica skeletons provoke irritation and secretion of mucus in fish gills, which leads to death. It has also been suggested that the mortality was caused by excessive cellular respiration during algal blooms of O. speculum, which decreased the dissolved oxygen in the water.

== Systematics ==
=== Taxonomic history ===
The genus Octactis was described in 1925 by phycologist Josef Schiller as a member of the Silicoflagellata, now known as the order Dictyochales, a group of stramenopile algae with siliceous skeletons. Several species have been described, but they have been rearranged between this genus and two more genera, Dictyocha and Stephanocha (formerly under the invalid Distephanus name due to being homonymous with the flowering plant Distephanus) multiple times.

The first Octactis species to be described was O. pulchra, proposed by Schiller himself in 1925. It was described from superficial marine samples of the middle to southern Adriatic Sea, and remained its type and only species. In 1985 the entire genus with all its species were synonymised to Distephanus (later Stephanocha). On the basis of molecular phylogeny, researchers in 2017 emended the definition of Octactis and transferred two species of Dictyocha, D. octonaria and D. speculum, to it.

=== Classification ===
There are two species of Octactis currently accepted:

- Octactis octonaria (Ehrenberg, 1844) Hovasse, 1946

= Dictyocha octonaria Ehrenberg, 1844

- Octactis speculum (Ehrenberg, 1839) F.H.Chang, J.M.Grieve & J.E.Sutherland, 2017

= Dictyocha speculum Ehrenberg, 1839
= Distephanus speculum (Ehrenberg, 1839) Haeckel, 1887
= Stephanocha speculum (Ehrenberg, 1839) McCartney & R.W.Jordan, 2015
