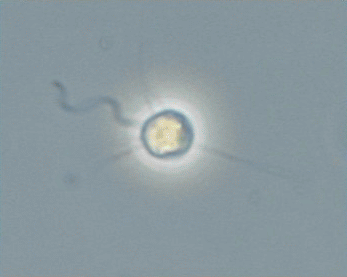
- Light micrograph of Pteridomonas danica

Scientific classification
- Domain: Eukaryota
- Clade: Diaphoretickes
- Clade: SAR
- Clade: Stramenopiles
- Phylum: Gyrista
- Subphylum: Ochrophytina
- Class: Dictyochophyceae
- Order: Pedinellales
- Family: Actinomonadaceae
- Genus: Pteridomonas; Penard, 1890

Type species
- Pteridomonas pulex Penard, 1890

Species
- P. danica; P. pulex; P. salina; P. scherffelii

= Pteridomonas =

Genus of flagellates

Pteridomonas is a genus of heterotrophic flagellates belonging to the phylum Ochrophyta. It was described in 1890 by Eugène Penard. Species of this genus descend from a group of photosynthetic algae but have secondarily lost their chloroplasts. They are single-celled flagellates, attached to the substrate by a stalk and distinguished by a ring of tentacles around the single flagellum. They can be found in marine, brackish or freshwater environments.

== Description ==
Species of the genus Pteridomonas are unicellular protists or eukaryotes that descend from algae but lack chloroplasts. Cells are usually attached to the substrate by a long stalk, and have a single flagellum at the opposite end from the stalk. They are very similar to Actinomonas, with stiff 'arms' or 'tentacles' that emanate from the cell body, but these are mainly confined to an anterior ring that surrounds the flagellum, unlike Actinomonas where they emanate in all directions. They are also distinguished by the presence of a very reduced flagellar 'wing' and paraxonemal rod, and by having two ring-like structures below the transverse septum of the ciliary transition zone such as in Apedinella.

== Ecology ==
Pteridomonas species are heterotrophic. They feed on bacteria and other protists by means of phagocytosis, making them phagotrophs. They are aquatic organisms found in marine, freshwater and brackish environments, living at different depths.

== Taxonomy ==
The genus Pteridomonas was described in 1890 by Swiss biologist Eugène Penard in a work on the protozoa found near Wiesbaden, published in the German journal Jahrbücher des Nassauischen Vereins für Naturkunde. Currently four species are accepted within the genus:

- Pteridomonas danica Patterson & Fenchel, 1985
- Pteridomonas pulex Penard, 1890
- Pteridomonas salina Bourrelly, 1953
- Pteridomonas scherffelii Lemmermann, 1913
