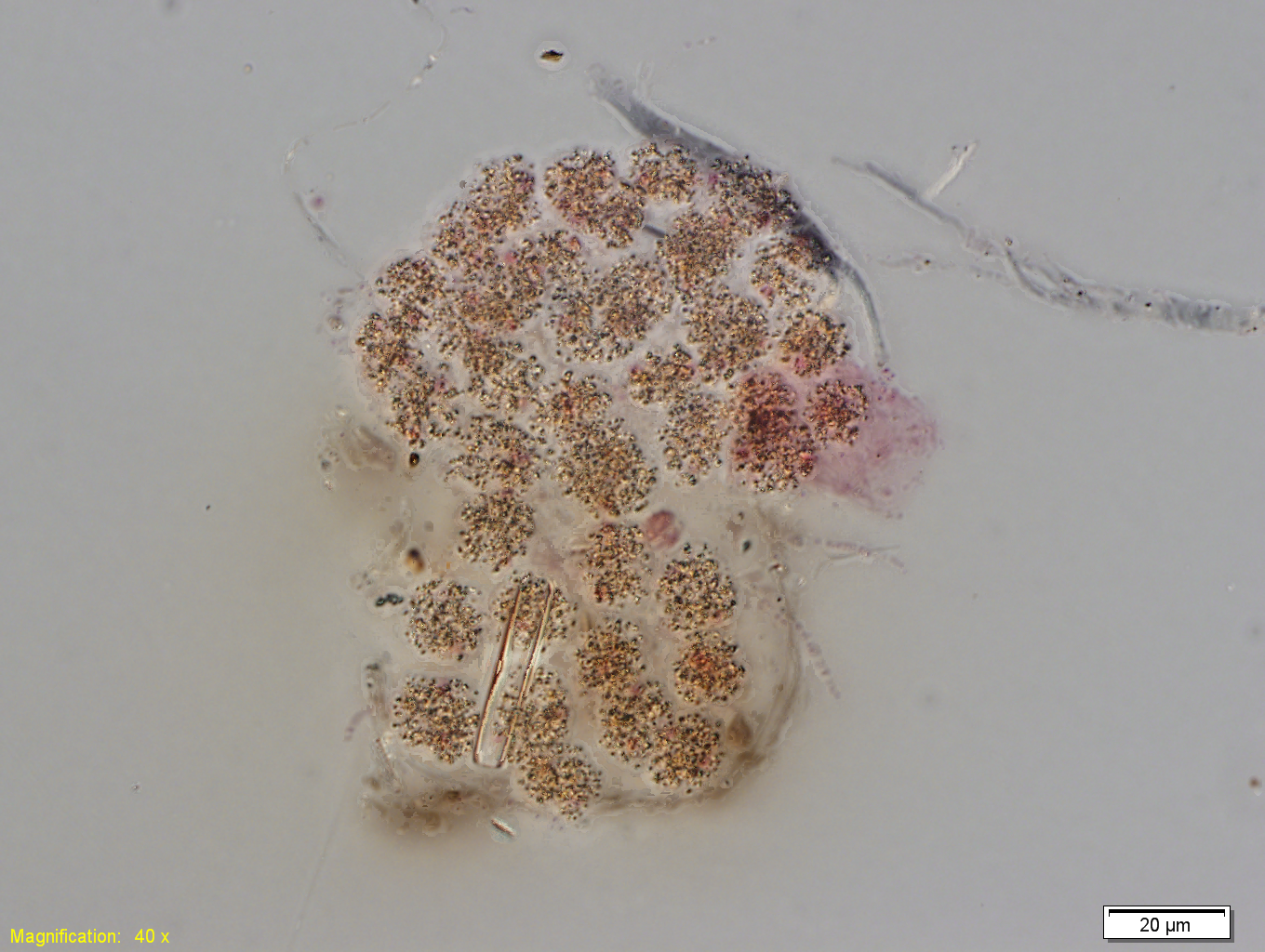
- Chlamydomyxa montana

Scientific classification
- Domain: Eukaryota
- Clade: Sar
- Clade: Stramenopiles
- Division: Ochrophyta
- Clade: SII
- Class: Synchromophyceae; S.Horn & C.Wilhelm 2007

Orders
- Synchromales; Chlamydomyxales; Leucomyxales

= Synchromophyceae =

Class of algae

Synchromophyceae is a class of photosynthetic stramenopiles. The chloroplast of the Synchromophyceae are surrounded by two membranes and arranged in a way where they share the outer pair of membranes. The entire chloroplast complex is surrounded by an additional two outer membranes.

== Evolution ==
Synchromophyceae is a class within the Ochrophyta that contains a few genera of amoeboid organisms, such as the mixotrophic Synchromonas and the heterotrophic Chlamydomyxa and Leucomyxa. It is phylogenetically close to the classes Chrysophyceae and Picophagea, within the SII clade.

- Ochrophyta
  - SIII
    Diatoms and relatives
  - - SI
      Phaeophytes, xanthophytes, etc.
    - SII
      - - Olisthodiscophyceae
        - Pinguiophyceae
      - - - Chrysophyceae
          - Synchromophyceae
        - Picophagea

== Taxonomy ==
The class Synchromophyceae was described in 2007 to include the genus Synchroma. Since then, other closely-related organisms have been added. As of 2024, three orders are recognized, each containing one genus, and two additional incertae sedis genera.

- Order Chlamydomyxales Archer 1875
  - Family Chlamydomyxaceae Engler 1897
    - Chlamydomyxa Archer 1875.
- Order Leucomyxales D.Barcytė & M.Eliáš 2024
  - Family Leucomyxaceae D.Barcytė & M.Eliáš 2024
    - Leucomyxa D.Barcytė & M.Eliáš 2024
- Order Synchromales R.Schnetter & Ehlers in Horn et al. 2007
  - Family Synchromaceae R.Schnetter & Ehlers in Horn et al. 2007
    - Synchroma R.Schnetter & Ehlers in Horn et al. 2007
- Synchromophyceae incertae sedis (possibly part of Synchromales)
  - Chrysopodocystis Billard 1978
  - Guanchochroma R.Schnetter & M.Schmidt 2015
