= Aureoumbra =

Scientific classification
- Domain: Eukaryota
- Clade: Diaphoretickes
- Clade: SAR
- Clade: Stramenopiles
- Phylum: Gyrista
- Subphylum: Ochrophytina
- Class: Dictyochophyceae
- Order: Sarcinochrysidales
- Family: Sarcinochrysidaceae
- Genus: Aureoumbra; D.A.Stockwell, DeYoe, Hargraves & P.W.Johnson, 1997

Genus of algae

Aureoumbra is a genus of algae belonging to the family Sarcinochrysidaceae.

Species:

- Aureoumbra geitleri M.Melkonian & C.P.Reyes
- Aureoumbra lagunensis D.A.Stockwell, DeYoe, Hargraves & P.W.Johnson
