= Rhizochromulina =

Scientific classification
- Domain: Eukaryota
- Clade: Diaphoretickes
- Clade: Sar
- Clade: Stramenopiles
- Phylum: Gyrista
- Subphylum: Ochrophytina
- Class: Dictyochophyceae
- Order: Rhizochromulinales
- Family: Rhizochromulinaceae
- Genus: Rhizochromulina; D.J.Hibberd & Chrétiennot-Dinet
- Species: R. marina

Binomial name
- Rhizochromulina marina D.J.Hibberd & Chrétiennot-Dinet

Genus of single-celled organisms

Rhizochromulina is an unusual genus of marine heterokont algae, with one species, Rhizocromulina marina. They are colored amoeboids with a single flagellum, and produce distinctive spindle-shaped zoospores. These have a cell structure typical of the axodines. Before it was studied in detail, Rhizochromulina was included among the superficially similar golden algae in the order Chrysamoebales, but these produce zoospores which are similar to flagellate golden algae in form.
