= Pinguiococcus =

Scientific classification
- Domain: Eukaryota
- Clade: Diaphoretickes
- Clade: Sar
- Clade: Stramenopiles
- Phylum: Gyrista
- Subphylum: Ochrophytina
- Class: Pinguiophyceae
- Order: Pinguiochrysidales
- Family: Pinguiochrysidaceae
- Genus: Pinguiococcus; R.A.Andersen, D.Potter, D.& J.C.Bailey
- Species: P. pyrenoidosus

Binomial name
- Pinguiococcus pyrenoidosus R.A.Andersen, D.Potter, D.& J.C.Bailey

Genus of algae

Pinguiococcus is a genus within Ochrophytina, a group of algae that also includes brown algae (seaweeds) and diatoms. The genus includes a single species, Pinguiococcus pyrenoidosus, which was first described in 2002.
