= Parapedinella =

Scientific classification
- Domain: Eukaryota
- Clade: Sar
- Clade: Stramenopiles
- Division: Ochrophyta
- Class: Dictyochophyceae
- Order: Pedinellales
- Family: Pedinellaceae
- Genus: Parapedinella; S.M.Pedersen, P.L.Beech & H.A.Thomsen
- Species: P. reticulata

Binomial name
- Parapedinella reticulata S.M.Pedersen & H.A.Thomsen

Genus of single-celled organisms

Parapedinella is a genus of heterokonts.

It includes a single species, Parapedinella reticulata.
