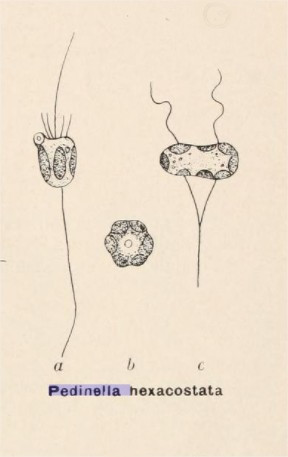
- Pedinella hexacostata

Scientific classification
- Domain: Eukaryota
- Clade: Diaphoretickes
- Clade: SAR
- Clade: Stramenopiles
- Phylum: Gyrista
- Subphylum: Ochrophytina
- Class: Dictyochophyceae
- Order: Pedinellales
- Family: Pedinellaceae
- Genus: Pedinella; Vysotskij, 1887

= Pedinella =

Genus of single-celled organisms

Pedinella is a genus of small, unicellular planktonic or attached, flagellated heterokonts first described in 1888 by A. V. Vysotskij. The genus is monospecific, and the single species is Pedinella hexacostata Vysotskij. Pedinella has an inverted bell or apple shape with a stalk arising from the posterior end, and has a single, long, ribbon-like, apical flagellum and, a second apical flagellum that is reduced to its basal body. The cells are radially symmetrical, with a large central nucleus, surrounded equatorially by a number of chloroplasts that cause the body to bulge out where the plastids are pushed up against the plasma membrane. The organism is found in freshwater and brackish freshwater habitats. Pedinella is a mixotroph and functions through either photosynthesis or by ingesting organic substances from its environment.
