= Mesopedinella =

Scientific classification
- Domain: Eukaryota
- Clade: Diaphoretickes
- Clade: SAR
- Clade: Stramenopiles
- Phylum: Gyrista
- Subphylum: Ochrophytina
- Class: Dictyochophyceae
- Order: Pedinellales
- Family: Pedinellaceae
- Genus: Mesopedinella; Daugbjerg
- Species: M. arctica

Binomial name
- Mesopedinella arctica Daugbjerg

Genus of single-celled organisms

Mesopedinella is a genus of heterokonts.

It includes a single species, Mesopedinella arctica.
