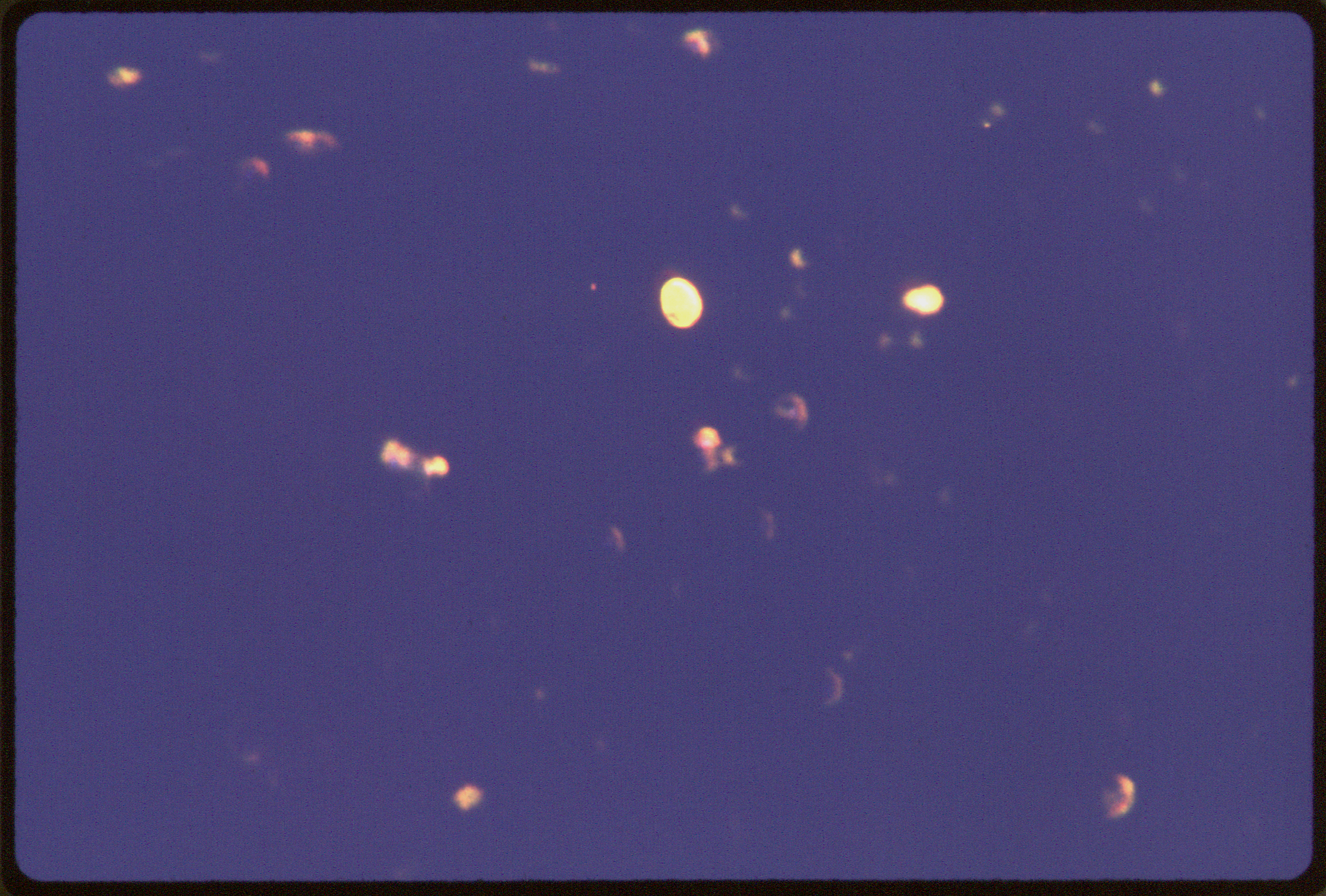

Scientific classification
- Domain: Eukaryota
- Clade: Sar
- Clade: Stramenopiles
- Division: Ochrophyta
- Clade: SII
- Class: Olisthodiscophyceae; Barcytė, Eikrem & M. Eliáš, 2021
- Order: Olisthodiscales; Cavalier-Smith, 2013 emend. Barcytė, Eikrem & M. Eliáš, 2021
- Family: Olisthodiscaceae; Cavalier-Smith, 2013 emend. Barcytė, Eikrem & M. Eliáš, 2021
- Genus: Olisthodiscus; Carter 1937

Type species
- Olisthodiscus luteus Carter 1937

Species
- Olisthodiscus luteus; Olisthodiscus tomasii

= Olisthodiscus =

Genus of heterokont algae

Olisthodiscus is a genus of heterokont algae, present in marine or brackish waters. It is the only genus in the family Olisthodiscaceae, the order Olisthodiscales, and the class Olisthodiscophyceae. After a long history of controversial classifications, in 2021 it was recognized as a phylogenetically distinct lineage from the rest of ochrophyte classes.

== Description ==
Olisthodiscus is a unicellular organism. Cells are rounded or pear-shaped, flattened and curved somewhat inwards. The cell membrane is covered in scales, fibrils, and bead-shaped protrusions; just underneath the plasma membrane are numerous vesicles. Cells have two flagella: one leads in front of the cell and is somewhat longer than the cell body, while the other trails behind and is equal in length to slightly shorter than the cell body. When swimming, Olisthodiscus glides along a substrate and does not rotate. Multiple plastids are present, and are parietally located; they contain pyrenoids. Olisthodiscus lacks eyespots or contractile vacuoles. However, it has a colored globule which is similar to lipid-storing vacuoles of other species. Olisthodiscus can produce cysts.

== Reproduction ==
Olisthodiscus reproduces asexually by longitudinal fission. It also produces zoospores. Sexual reproduction has not been observed in Olisthodiscus.

== Systematics ==
=== History of taxonomy ===
After its description in 1937, Olisthodiscus was placed in Xanthophyceae. In 1985, a study of the ultrastructure of a Japanese strain of Olisthodiscus concluded that it would be more appropriately placed in the Raphidophyceae. However, publications from 1980 to 1992 noted the differences between Olisthodiscus and other raphidophytes, since it lacked ejectile organelles and had a yellowish colour; additionally, it was observed that the flagellar root system was more similar to chrysophytes and brown algae than to raphidophytes. Despite the differences, a revision in 1992 did not accept these arguments and preferred to maintain Olisthodiscus in Raphidophyceae. A thesis from 1999 proposed Olisthodiscophyceae as a separate class for the first time, but it was never published in a peer-reviewed journal.

With the use of molecular phylogenetic analyses, Olisthodiscus appeared as a branch outside Raphidophyceae or any other described ochrophyte class. Because of this, in 2013 it was assigned to a new subclass Sulcophycidae as part of class Hypogyristea, along with pelagophytes and dictyophytes, although with low support for the monophyly of this class. It was proposed that Sulcochrysis belonged to this class along with Olisthodiscus, but due to lack of DNA sequences from this organism it could not be confirmed. In 2021 a study investigated Olisthodiscus and proved it is a separate phylogenetic lineage. It was then placed in its own class, Olisthodiscophyceae.

- Ochrophyta
  - SIII
    - Bacillariophyceae
    - - Pelagophyceae
      - Dictyochophyceae
  - - SI
      - Raphidophyceae
      - - Xanthophyceae
        - Phaeophyceae
    - SII
      - - Olisthodiscophyceae
        - Pinguiophyceae
      - Limnista
        - - Synchromophyceae
          - Chrysophyceae
        - Eustigmatophyceae

=== Species ===
Apart from the type species described in 1937, Olisthodiscus luteus, two other species were added in the 20th century: O. carterae and O. magnus, which were later recognized as conspecific with Heterosigma akashiwo and Chattonella marina respectively. This rendered Olisthodiscus monotypic, with O. luteus as its only species, until 2021, when a new species was described: O. tomasii.

- Olisthodiscus luteus Carter, 1937
- Olisthodiscus tomasii Barcytė, Eikrem & M. Eliáš, 2021
