= Pseudopedinella =

Scientific classification
- Domain: Eukaryota
- Clade: Diaphoretickes
- Clade: SAR
- Clade: Stramenopiles
- Phylum: Gyrista
- Subphylum: Ochrophytina
- Class: Dictyochophyceae
- Order: Pedinellales
- Family: Pedinellaceae
- Genus: Pseudopedinella; N.Carter

Genus of single-celled organisms

Pseudopedinella is a heterokont genus found in brackish waters. It includes the species Pseudopedinella elastica.
