= Glossomastix =

Scientific classification
- Domain: Eukaryota
- Clade: Diaphoretickes
- Clade: SAR
- Clade: Stramenopiles
- Phylum: Gyrista
- Subphylum: Ochrophytina
- Class: Pinguiophyceae
- Order: Pinguiochrysidales
- Family: Pinguiochrysidaceae
- Genus: Glossomastix; C.J.O'Kelly
- Species: G. chrysoplasta

Binomial name
- Glossomastix chrysoplasta C.J.O'Kelly

Genus of algae

Glossomastix is a genus of heterokont.

It includes a single species, Glossomastix chrysoplasta.
