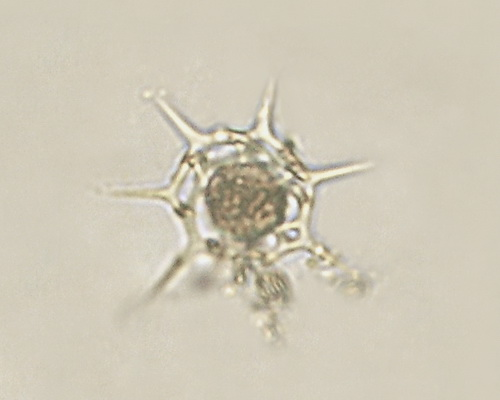
- D. speculum

Scientific classification
- Domain: Eukaryota
- Clade: Sar
- Clade: Stramenopiles
- Division: Ochrophyta
- Class: Dictyochophyceae
- Order: Dictyochales
- Family: Dictyochaceae
- Genus: Dictyocha; Ehrenberg, 1837

Type species
- Dictyocha speculum Ehrenberg, 1837

Species
- D. speculum; D. fibula; D. octonaria

Synonyms
- Hannaites Mandra, 1969; Akbuluta Özdikmen, 2009

= Dictyocha =

Genus of unicellular algae

Dictyocha is a genus of silicoflagellates, marine photosynthetic unicellular protists that take the form of either flagellates or axopodial amoebae. Described by Ehrenberg in 1837, Dictyocha contains many important species of the marine phytoplankton, some of them responsible for algal blooms that are toxic to fish.

== Systematics ==
The genus Dictyocha was described in 1837 by Ehrenberg from Algerian fossil material, and its taxonomy has been based exclusively on the morphology of their siliceous skeletons. Dictyocha was regarded as the sole genus of the entire family Dictyochaceae and order Dictyochales (known as silicoflagellates sensu stricto) until 2012, when a second genus Vicicitus was described. There are currently four accepted species of Dictyocha:

- Dictyocha speculum Ehrenberg, 1837
- Dictyocha fibula Ehrenberg, 1837
- Dictyocha octonaria Ehrenberg, 1837
- Dictyocha californica Schrader & Murray, 1983
