= Synchroma =

Scientific classification
- Domain: Eukaryota
- Clade: Sar
- Clade: Stramenopiles
- Phylum: Ochrophyta
- Class: Synchromophyceae
- Order: Synchromales; Schnetter & Ehlers in Horn et al., 2007
- Family: Synchromaceae; Schnetter & Ehlers in Horn et al., 2007
- Genus: Synchroma; Schnetter in Horn et al., 2007

Type species
- Synchroma grande Schnetter in Horn et al., 2007

Species
- Synchroma grande; Synchroma pusillum

Genus of algae

Synchroma (from Greek syn- 'with, together' and chroma 'color') is a genus of marine stramenopile algae containing two species with amoeboid morphology. They are grouped within the monotypic family Synchromaceae and order Synchromales as part of an independent clade of ochrophytes known as Synchromophyceae.

They are distinguished by their plastid complexes, composed of several chloroplasts grouped together and collectively enveloped by the same membranes. Within their life cycle, Synchroma cells are usually sessile and protected by a lorica. These cells can join their reticulopodia in a network known as meroplasmodium, or they can become migrating amoebae capable of fusing to each other.

== Cellular structure ==
Synchroma are eukaryotic algae composed of amoeboid cells with no flagella and multiple yellowish-green chloroplasts containing chlorophyll a and c_{2}, fucoxanthin, violaxanthin, antheraxanthin, zeaxanthin and b-carotene. Each cell presents plastid complexes of 6-8 chloroplasts each. Within the complexes, the pigmented lobes of the chloroplasts radiate from the center. Each pigmented lobe has longitudinally arranged lamellae, without a girdle lamella (i.e. a peripherical lamella that surrounds all other lamellae, characteristic of some ochrophytes). In the center of the complex, the non-pigmented pyrenoids of all chloroplasts are tightly grouped and surrounded by a single vesicle. Each chloroplast is surrounded by two 'inner' membranes, while the entire plastid complex is surrounded by two 'outer' membranes, with the outermost membrane as the rough endoplasmic reticulum.

== Life cycle of Synchroma ==
=== Sessile stages and meroplasmodium ===
The main appearance of Synchroma is as sessile, amoeboid cells of around 16 or 22 μm in diameter on average, depending on the culture conditions. The cell body is attached through cytoplasmic strands to a flattened spherical lorica, 26 μm in diameter, which in turn is attached to the substrate. Multiple sessile cells can form a meroplasmodium, an association of several spherical cell bodies through a common network of reticulopodia, which allows the capture and transport of food particles. The sessile cells can undergo binary cell division (asexual reproduction).

Another sessile stage of Synchroma is the cyst, a spherical cell with a highly granular cytoplasm and no reticulopodia, surrounded by a multilayered cell wall. This has been interpreted as the resting stage of Synchroma, sometimes occurring within a lorica.

=== Non-sessile stages and aggregates ===
After binary cell division of a sessile Synchroma cell, while one of the daughter cells remains in the lorica, the other one hatches through the opening and becomes a migrating amoeba. These migrating cells without a lorica have a dynamic cell shape and size, capable of stretching and reaching five times their initial length. When attached to the substrate, they appear flattened. Within minutes, they can begin to float on the medium and switch to a 'heliozoa'-like form, with a spherical cell shape and 6-30 axopodia, sometimes fixing to the substrate through one or two of these axopodia. The floating cells can switch back into the migrating amoebae. After some period of time, the hatched amoebae form a lorica and become sessile cells.

The migrating amoeboid cells can fuse by contacting their filopodia together, then fusing the ectoplasm of several cells, then fusing the endoplasm. The fused cells can become sessile by forming a lorica. If two cells merge, they can undergo karyogamy (sexual reproduction) and differentiate into a tetrad, and three or all four of the daughter cells can hatch out of the lorica. Large cell aggregates can reach over 60 μm in size.

== Ecology ==
Synchroma cells feed by phagotrophy of bacteria and other algae such as Phaeodactylum tricornutum. The cytoplasmic strands attach to the prey cells and are then hauled toward the main cell body until they reach the lorica, where they are digested. The reticulopodia can absorb cytoplasmic material of other cells without killing them.

This marine genus of algae displays sessile and non-sessile cell stages within its life cycle, with a dominating sessile amoeboid stage. It is assumed that it lives mainly benthic on sublittoral rocks. The strong adhesion of the lorica on the substrate could prevent cells from being washed away.

== Evolution ==
Synchroma is a genus of stramenopile algae belonging to the class Synchromophyceae. The evolutionary origin of the plastid complexes found in Synchroma is still an enigma. Synchroma is the only case of multiplastidic stramenopile algae where the plastids are retained together in a common compartment.

== Classification ==
Synchroma contains two species:

- Synchroma grande Schnetter in Horn et al., 2007
- Synchroma pusillum Schnetter in Schmidt et al., 2012
