= Pelagomonas =

Scientific classification
- Domain: Eukaryota
- Clade: Sar
- Clade: Stramenopiles
- Division: Ochrophyta
- Class: Dictyochophyceae
- Order: Pelagomonadales
- Family: Pelagomonadaceae
- Genus: Pelagomonas; R.A.Andersen & G.W.Saunders
- Species: P. calceolata

Binomial name
- Pelagomonas calceolata R.A.Andersen & G.W.Saunders

Genus of single-celled organisms

Pelagomonas is a genus of heterokont algae. It is a monotypic genus and includes a single species, Pelagomonas calceolata which is a unicellular flagellate organism, a ubiquitous constituent of marine picoplankton. It is an ultra-planktonic marine alga.

== Description ==
Pelagomonas calceolata is uniflagellate, about 1.5 × 3 μm in size. Microtubular roots, striated roots and a second basal body are absent. A thin organic theca surrounds most of the cell. There is a single chloroplast with a girdle lamella and a single, dense mitochondrion with tubular cristae. A single Golgi body with swelled cisternae lies beneath the flagellum, and each cell has an ejectile organelle that putatively releases a cylindrical structure. A vacuole, or cluster of vacuoles, contains the putative carbohydrate storage product.
