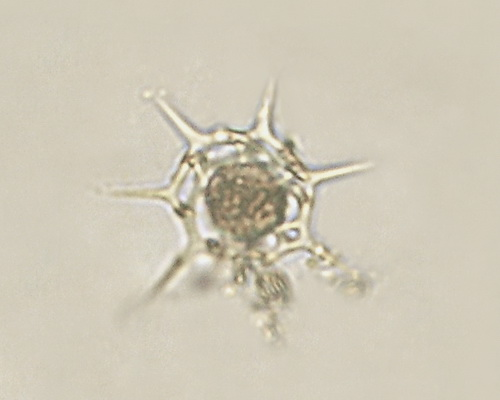
- Dictyocha speculum

Scientific classification
- Domain: Eukaryota
- Clade: Sar
- Clade: Stramenopiles
- Division: Ochrophyta
- Class: Dictyochophyceae
- Order: Dictyochales; Haeckel, 1894
- Family: Dictyochaceae; Lemmermann, 1901

Genera
- Dictyocha; Octactis; Stephanocha; Vicicitus

Synonyms
- Silicoflagellata Borgert, 1890; Dictyochida Borgert, 1891

= Dictyochales =

Silicoflagellates Temporal range: 115–0 Ma

Order of single-celled organisms

The silicoflagellates (order Dictyochales) are a small group of unicellular photosynthetic protists, or algae, belonging to the supergroup of eukaryotes known as Stramenopiles. They behave as phytoplankton and are present in oceanic waters. They are well known from harmful algal blooms that cause high mortality of fish. Additionally, they compose a rich fossil record represented by their silica skeletons.

== Morphology ==
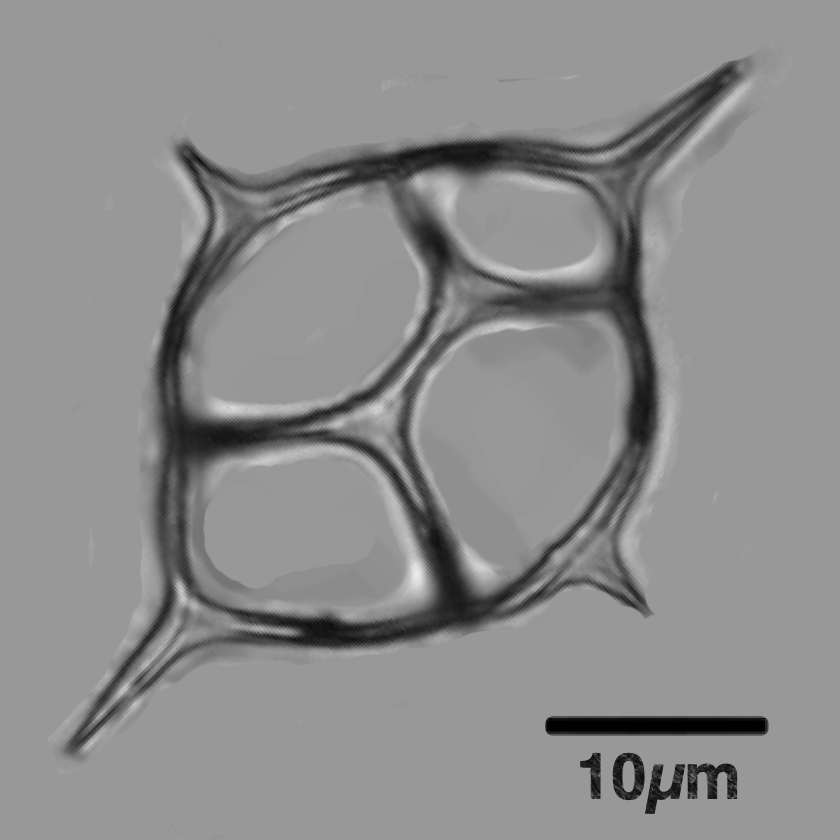
Dictyocha fibula

The silicoflagellates are unicellular protists, composed of cells with one emergent flagellum and a siliceous skeleton constructed from a network of hollow rods outside of the cytoplasm. The morphology of the skeleton can vary greatly, from a simple ring, an ellipse or triangle, to a more complex and complete arrangement of rods. For example, in Dictyocha fibula (pictured) the skeleton rods are arranged in a series of peripheral polygons surrounding a central hexagon. These skeletons form a small component of marine sediments, and are well-known microfossils dating as far back as the early Cretaceous.

The silicoflagellates are considered algae due to being photosynthetic. Their chloroplasts are usually present inside the numerous cytoplasmic processes that extend from the central mass of the cytoplasm, where the cell nucleus is located. There is a possibility that silicoflagellate chloroplasts are derived from haptophyte algae through tertiary endosymbiosis.

== Ecology ==
Silicoflagellates are photosynthetic microscopic algae present in the upper part of the marine water column, as phytoplankton. They are adapted to both warm and cold waters. Similarly to diatoms, silicoflagellates are most productive where high levels of silica and nutrients are present in near-surface waters. They are known to cause harmful algal blooms, or red tides, in many parts of Europe. Blooms of silicoflagellates cause fish mortality because their silica skeletons obstruct and abrade fish gills, leading to asphyxiation and subsequent death. Additionally, some silicoflagellates are thought to produce ichthyotoxins, i.e. substances toxic to fish, although their effect is debated. Apart from physical damage to fish, the depletion of dissolved oxygen in water due to their cellular respiration during bloom growth has also caused fish mortality in fisheries and aquaculture.

== Systematics ==
=== Taxonomy ===
Silicoflagellates compose the family Dictyochaceae (in botanical nomenclature) or Dictyochidae (in zoological nomenclature), contained within the order Dictyochales or Silicoflagellata. They were previously classified as Chrysophyceae (golden algae). Through morphological and molecular similarities, this group was eventually transferred to the Dictyochophyceae, which contains three additional orders, Pedinellales, Florenciellales and Rhizochromulinales. After decades of phylogenetic analyses, silicoflagellates and the rest of Dictyochophyceae are accepted as a class of the phylum Ochrophyta, within the eukaryotic supergroup Stramenopiles.

=== Genera ===
There are four living genera: Dictyocha, Octactis, Stephanocha (earlier known as Distephanus, homonymous with the flowering plant Distephanus) and Vicicitus, with 11 recognised living species. Dictyocha was previously the only member of the order, until Vicicitus was created for a species previously assigned to the raphidophyte Chattonella but later proven to be a Dictyochophyceae through phylogenetic analyses.

- Dictyocha Ehrenberg, 1837 — 4 spp.
- Octactis J. Schiller, 1925 — 2 spp.
- Stephanocha R.W.Jordan & McCartney, 2015 (=Distephanus Stöhr, 1880 nom. illeg.) — 4 spp.
- Vicicitus F.H.Chang, 2012 — 1 sp.

There are also several extinct genera, but their classification is difficult, since skeletons may show diverse forms within each living species.

- †Arctyocha Bukry, 1985 — 3 spp.
- †Corbisema Hanna, 1928 — 5 spp.
- †Cornua Schulz, 1928 — 6 spp.
- †Gleserocha McCartney, Witkowski & Harwood, 2014 — 3 spp.
- †Lyramula Hanna, 1928 — 2 spp.
- †Schulzyocha McCartney, Witkowski & Harwood, 2011 — 5 spp.
- †Umpiocha McCartney, Witkowski & Harwood, 2011 — 2 spp.
- †Vallacerta Hanna, 1928 — 5 spp.
- †Variramus McCartney, Wise, Harwood & Gersonde, 1990 ex McCartney, Witkowski & Harwood 2011 — 2 spp.

== Evolution ==
Proposed relationships among Cenozoic silicoflagellates

- - - † Cornua
    - 62.0 Ma
      - † Pseudonaviculopsis
      - † Corbisema archangelskiana group
  - 62.4 Ma
    - 61.5 Ma
      - 59.9 Ma
        - † Corbisema tracantha group
        - † Naviculopsis
      - 37.8 Ma
        - 37.1 Ma
          - † Distephanopsis
          - 18.4 Ma
            - † Caryocha
            - 13.0 Ma
              - † Paramesocena
              - 2.0 Ma?
                Octactis
              - Stephanocha
        - Dictyocha
    - 48.0 Ma
      - † four-sided star-of-David double skeletons
      - † Corbisema apiculata group
- - 55.5 Ma
    † Bachmannocena

Proposed evolutionary history for Cenozoic silicoflagellate genera based on their skeletal morphology, with estimated divergence ages in millions of years ago (Ma). The 4-sided fossils with star-of-David-shaped double skeletons presumably belong to the genus including Corbisema apiculata, while the 3-sided fossils currently placed in Corbisema are proposed to belong to multiple different genera not yet formally named.

The fossil record of silicoflagellates extends back to early Albian times, in the Early Cretaceous, around 115 million years ago. However, data on Late Cretaceous and Paleocene silicoflagellate evolution is sparse, and they are best known from the Eocene to Recent era. Silicoflagellate skeletons from the Cretaceous are markedly different from Cenozoic ones: before the Santonian (around 85 million years ago) they presented branched, non-ringed shapes. During the Cenozoic, silicoflagellates show an evolutionary trend towards more complicated apical and basal structures, resulting in a design that resembles a hemisphere. As a consequence, after mitosis, the pair of daughter cell skeletons resembles a near-sphere.
