= Apedinella =

Scientific classification
- Domain: Eukaryota
- Clade: Diaphoretickes
- Clade: SAR
- Clade: Stramenopiles
- Phylum: Gyrista
- Subphylum: Ochrophytina
- Class: Dictyochophyceae
- Order: Pedinellales
- Family: Pedinellaceae
- Genus: Apedinella; Throndsen
- Species: A. radians

Binomial name
- Apedinella radians (Lohmann) P.H.Campbell

Small group of heterokonts

Apedinella, also called Pedinellophyceae, is a small group of heterokonts (stramenopelis) with one species, the Apedinella radians. It is assigned to the class Dictyochophyceae and the order of Pedinellaceae. It is a single cell marine phytoflagellate algae with chloroplasts found in seas all over the world.

== Characteristics ==
The Apedinella cells have an apple like shape with one flagellum, containing mastigonemes, emerging as the stem. The cell diameter is about 7,5-12 micrometres and the calculated volume is between 221 and 904 micrometres ^3. The cell has radical symmetry. Each side had 3 symmetrical chloroplasts with big pyrenoids, which are laying more towards the inner side of the cell. The dictyosome is located more posterior and the nucleus is in the centre of the cell.

The cells have two kinds of scales: ovoid bodies and elongated spine-scales. The whole cell surface is covered in the ovoid bodies and the cell has six long and slender spine scales, which help the cell undergo reorientation while swimming. The cells are also capable of changing direction without repositioning these spine-scales. The cytoskeleton shows a high complexity for a cell this small. It has an extensive microtubular network and a system of both actin and centrin filamentous bundles.

== Spine scales ==
Spine scales are long cellulosic scales that are normally posterior in a cone shape behind the cell while swimming. When the cell changes swimming direction, the spine-scales reorientate laterally for a short amount of time and then they return to the posterior position. They vary in length from 10 micrometre to 26 micrometers.

The spine scales are attached to plaques, which lay in between the chloroplasts and on the upper half of the cell. The plaques are positioned just under the plasma membrane. This attachment is mediated via external micro ligaments. These micro ligaments themselves cannot contract, but they do act as a hinge for when the spine scales undergo reorientation.

Each plaque is attached too actin and centrin filamentous bundles. If these bundles shorten the opposite plaques will move about 30% closer to each other and move deeper into the cell, more in between the chloroplasts. This causes the spine-scales to be moved into a more lateral position.

== Cell cycle of the spine scales ==
The cell cycle of A. radians can be divided into four phases: interphase, pre-division, cell division and post-division.

During pre-division, six new spine scales are created and secreted. The new spine scales are formed in spine-scale forming vesicles (SSFV). Densely packed tubular material is present in the SSFV, and they run down the length of the SSFV as the spine-scale is formed. The tubular material forms one spine-scale at the time. When created, the spine-scales look like they are extracellular, but they are still surrounded by this SSFV extension and, which makes them not restricted by the cell size. The spine-scales are created posterior of the cell and then they are moved anteriorly below the cell equator, where they stay until the actual cell division. The new spine-scales are passively attached, so they can’t change position like the old spine-scales, because they are not attached to the plaques.

The second type of scales, the body scales, are formed in specialized body scale forming vesicles (BSFV). The BSFVs also contain actin around the circumference, and they are present on the posterior side of the cell and are secreted from this region as well.

A scale associated protein (SAP) is a cell surface component that has been found to play a role in adhesion of the scales
