= Picophagus =

Scientific classification
- Domain: Eukaryota
- Clade: Sar
- Clade: Stramenopiles
- Division: Ochrophyta
- Clade: SII
- Class: Picophagea; Cavalier-Smith 2006 emend. T.Pánek & M.Eliáš in Terpis et al. 2024
- Order: Picophagales; Cavalier-Smith 2006
- Family: Picophagaceae; Cavalier-Smith 2006
- Genus: Picophagus; Guillou & Chrétiennot-Dinet, 1999
- Species: P. flagellatus

Binomial name
- Picophagus flagellatus Guillou & Chrétiennot-Dinet, 1999

Genus of flagellates

Picophagus is a genus of marine heterotrophic flagellates described in 1999. It evolved from photosynthetic algae that lost their chloroplasts. It is classified in the monotypic family Picophagaceae, order Picophagales and class Picophagea.
