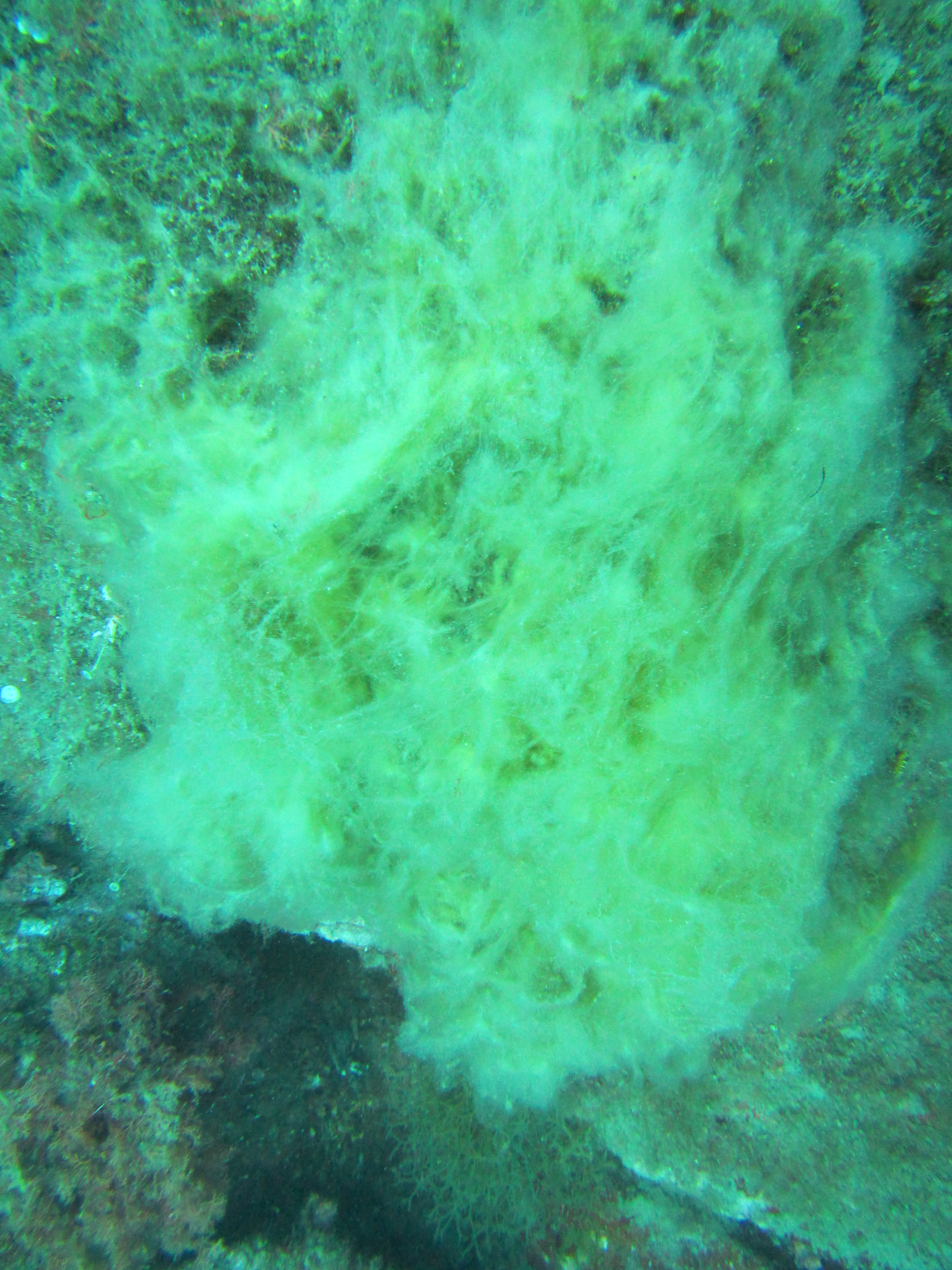

Scientific classification
- Domain: Eukaryota
- Clade: Sar
- Clade: Stramenopiles
- Division: Ochrophyta
- Clade: Diatomista
- Class: Pelagophyceae; R.A.Andersen & G.W.Saunders 1993

Orders
- Pelagomonadales; Sarcinochrysidales

Synonyms
- Pelagophycidae Andersen & Saunders 1993 ex Cavalier-Smith 2006; Sarcinochrysidae Cavalier-Smith 1993; Sarcinochrysidophyceae Van Den Hoek, Mann & Jahns 1995

= Pelagophyceae =

Class of algae

Pelagophyceae is a class of heterokont algae. It is the sister group of the Dictyochophyceae.

All known species are marine. They can be single-celled (coccoid or flagellate), palmelloid or filamentous. Some members (Pelagomonas) belong to picoplankton, and some other (Sarcinochrysis) are macroscopic attached organisms.

The class contains 13 genera, three families and two orders :

- Order Pelagomonadales Andersen & Saunders 1993
  - Family Pelagomonadaceae Andersen & Saunders 1993
    - Genus Aureococcus Hargraves & Sieburth 1988
    - Genus Chromopallida Wetherbee 2022
    - Genus Chrysophaeum Lewis & Bryan 1941 non Taylor 1951
    - Genus Pelagococcus Norris 1977
    - Genus Pelagomonas Andersen & Saunders 1993
    - Genus Wyeophycus Wetherbee 2022
- Order Sarcinochrysidales Gayral & Billard 1977
  - Family Chrysocystaceae Melkonian, Yoon & Andersen 2018
    - Genus Chrysocystis Lobban, Honda & Chihara 1995
    - Genus Chrysoreinhardia Billard 2000
    - Genus Sungminbooa Yoon & Andersen 2018
  - Family Nematochrysopsidaceae Gayral & Billard 1977
    - Genus Nematochrysopsis Chadefaud 1947
  - Family Sarcinochrysidaceae Gayral & Billard 1977
    - Genus Andersenia Wetherbee & Waller 2015
    - Genus Ankylochrysis Billard 1995
    - Genus Arachnochrysis Andersen & Han 2018
    - Genus Aureoscheda Wynne & Andersen 2014
    - Genus Aureoumbra Stockwell et al. 1997
    - Genus Chrysonephos Taylor 1952
    - Genus Gazia Wetherbee & Bringloe 2021
    - Genus Glomerochrysis Wetherbee & Bringloe 2021
    - Genus Pelagospilus Andersen & Graf 2018
    - Genus Sarcinochrysis Geitler 1930
    - Genus Sargassococcus Andersen & Han 2018
