= Epibrassicasterol =

Epibrassicasterol (also called crinosterol) is a type of cholesterol most commonly found in marine invertebrates. Epibrassicasterol is a 28 carbon cholesterol with an alpha oriented methyl group at carbon 24. It is often mixed isomerically with the more common beta-isomer, brassicasterol. Epibrassicasterol can be used as a biomarker to identify the presence of marine life in an environment and can be dated based on the location of fossilized remains in various rock structures.

== Early Findings ==
Studies in the late 1980s and 1990s focused on identifying multiple organic biomarkers commonly produced by marine life. Both epibrassicasterol and brassicasterol were found to be present in algae and mollusks. However, because many mollusks eat algae and mollusks often produce extra alkyl side chains on organic molecules that they create, it is believed that epibrassicasterol and brassicasterol originally come only from algae. The occurrence of both of these isomers simultaneously can indicate a high algal presence in the local environment.

Chemical Structure of Epibrassicasterol (also called Crinosterol)
IUPAC Name:	(3β,22E)-Ergosta-5,22-dien-3-ol
Other Names:	24α-methyl-22-dehydrocholesterol
ChemSpider ID:	4937703
PubChem ID:	5283660
Chemical Formula:	C_{28}H_{46}O
Molecular Weight:	398.675 g/mol
