= Pinguiochrysidaceae =

Scientific classification
- Domain: Eukaryota
- Clade: Sar
- Clade: Stramenopiles
- Division: Ochrophyta
- Clade: SII
- Class: Pinguiophyceae; Kawachi et al.
- Order: Pinguiochrysidales; Kawachi et al.
- Family: Pinguiochrysidaceae; Kawachi, Inouye, Honda, O'Kelly, Bailey, Bidigare & R.A.Andersen

Synonyms
- Pinguiophycidae Kawachi et al. 2002 stat. nov. Cavalier-Smith 2006

Family of algae

Pinguiochrysidaceae is a family of marine Heterokontophyta. It is the only family in the order Pinguiochrysidales, which is the only order in the class Pinguiophyceae. It includes five species of unicellular organisms with high concentration of polyunsaturated fatty acids in the cytoplasm. The other common features are the lack of cell wall and the tendency for flagella loss even on the stage of zoospore, which is unusual for heterokonts. One species (Polypodochrysis teissieri) inhabits benthic substates (sometimes found the mucilage of other algae) and is able to produce lorica with one or more tubular necks. The other species live in the plankton.

== Species ==
- Class Pinguiophyceae
  - Order Pinguiochrysidales Kawachi et al., 2002
    - Family Pinguiochrysidaceae Kawachi et al., 2002
      - Genus Glossomastix O’Kelly, 2002
        - Species Glossomastix chrysoplasta O’Kelly, 2002
      - Genus Phaeomonas Honda & Inouye, 2002
        - Species Phaeomonas parva Honda & Inouye, 2002
      - Genus Pinguiochrysis Kawachi, Atsumi, Ikemoto & Miyachi, 2002
        - Species Pinguiochrysis pyriformis Kawachi, Atsumi, Ikemoto & Miyachi, 2002
        - Species Pinguiochrysis rumoiana Kato & Masuda 2003
      - Genus Pinguiococcus Andersen, Potter & Bailey, 2002
        - Species Pinguiococcus pyrenoidosus Andersen, Potter & Bailey, 2002
      - Genus Polypodochrysis Magne, 1975
        - Species Polypodochrysis teissieri Magne, 1975
