= Rhizochromulinales =

Scientific classification
- Domain: Eukaryota
- Clade: Sar
- Clade: Stramenopiles
- Phylum: Ochrophyta
- Class: Dictyochophyceae
- Order: Rhizochromulinales; C.J.O'Kelly & D.E.Wujek

Order of single-celled organisms

Rhizochromulinales is an order of Dictyochophyceae. The order includes the genus, Rhizochromulina.

Ciliophrys is also sometimes included in this group.
