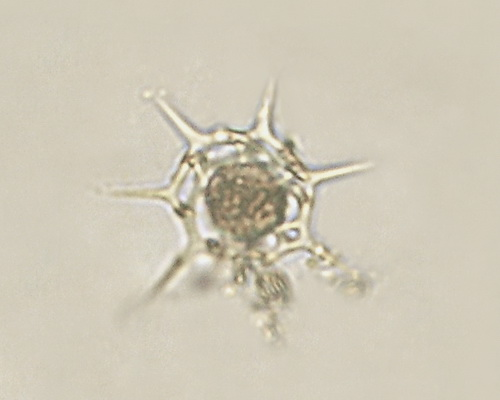
- Dictyocha speculum

Scientific classification
- Domain: Eukaryota
- Clade: Sar
- Clade: Stramenopiles
- Division: Ochrophyta
- Clade: Diatomista
- Class: Dictyochophyceae; P.C.Silva

Orders
- Sulcochrysidales; Pelagomonadales; Sarcinochrysidales; Dictyochales; Florenciellales; Pedinellales; Rhizochromulinales

Synonyms
- Hypogyristea Cavalier-Smith 2006; incl.: Pelagophyceae Andersen & Saunders 1993; Actinodinea Mikrjukov, 2001; Pedinellea Cavalier-Smith 1986; Pedinellophyceae Kristiansen 1986

= Dictyochophyceae =

Class of single-celled organisms

Dictyochophyceae sensu lato is a photosynthetic lineage of heterokont algae.

== Taxonomy ==
- Class Dictyochophyceae Silva 1980 s.l.
  - Subclass Sulcophycidae Cavalier-Smith 2013
    - Order Olisthodiscales Cavalier-Smith 2013
      - Family Olisthodiscaceae Cavalier-Smith 2013
    - Order Sulcochrysidales Cavalier-Smith 2013
      - Family Sulcochrysidaceae Cavalier-Smith 2013
  - Subclass Alophycidae Cavalier-Smith 2006 [Dictyochia Haeckel 1894 sensu Cavalier-Smith 1993]
    - Infraclass Pelagophycia Andersen & Saunders 1993 emend. 1995 stat. nov. [Pelagophyceae Andersen & Saunders 1993]
      - Order Pelagomonadales Andersen & Saunders 1993
        - Family Pelagomonadaceae Andersen & Saunders 1993
      - Order Sarcinochrysidales Gayral & Billard 1977
        - Family Sarcinochrysidaceae Gayral & Billard 1977
    - Infraclass Actinochrysia Cavalier-Smith 1995 stat. nov. 2006 [Axodines Patterson, 1994; Actinochrysea Cavalier-Smith 1995; Actinochrysophyceae Cavalier-Smith 1995; Dictyochophyceae Silva 1980 emend. Moestrup, 1995]
      - Superorder Silicoflagellata Borgert 1890 sensu Lemmermann, 1901 emend. Moestrup 1995 [Silicophycidae Rothmaler 1951; Silicoflagellida; Silicomastigota; Dictyochidae Haeckel 1894; Dictyochophycidae; Dictyochea; Dictyochophyceae Silva 1980 s.s.]
        - Order Florenciellales Eikrem, Edvardsen & Throndsen 2007
          - Family Florenciellaceae
        - Order Dictyochales Haeckel 1894
          - Family Dictyochaceae Lemmermann 1901
      - Superorder Abodines Patterson 2001 [Abaxodinae Mikrjukov 2001; Pedinellidae Cavalier-Smith 1986]
        - Order Rhizochromulinales O'Kelly & Wujek 1994
          - Family Rhizochromulinaceae O'Kelly & Wujek 1994
        - Order Pedinellales Zimmermann, Moestrup & Hällfors 1984 [Actinomonadineae Cavalier-Smith 2006; Ciliophryineae Febvre-Chevalier ex Cavalier-Smith 2006]
          - Family Cyrtophoraceae Pascher 1911
          - Family Pedinellaceae Pascher 1910 [Actinomonadaceae Kent 1880; Ciliophryidae Poche, 1913]
