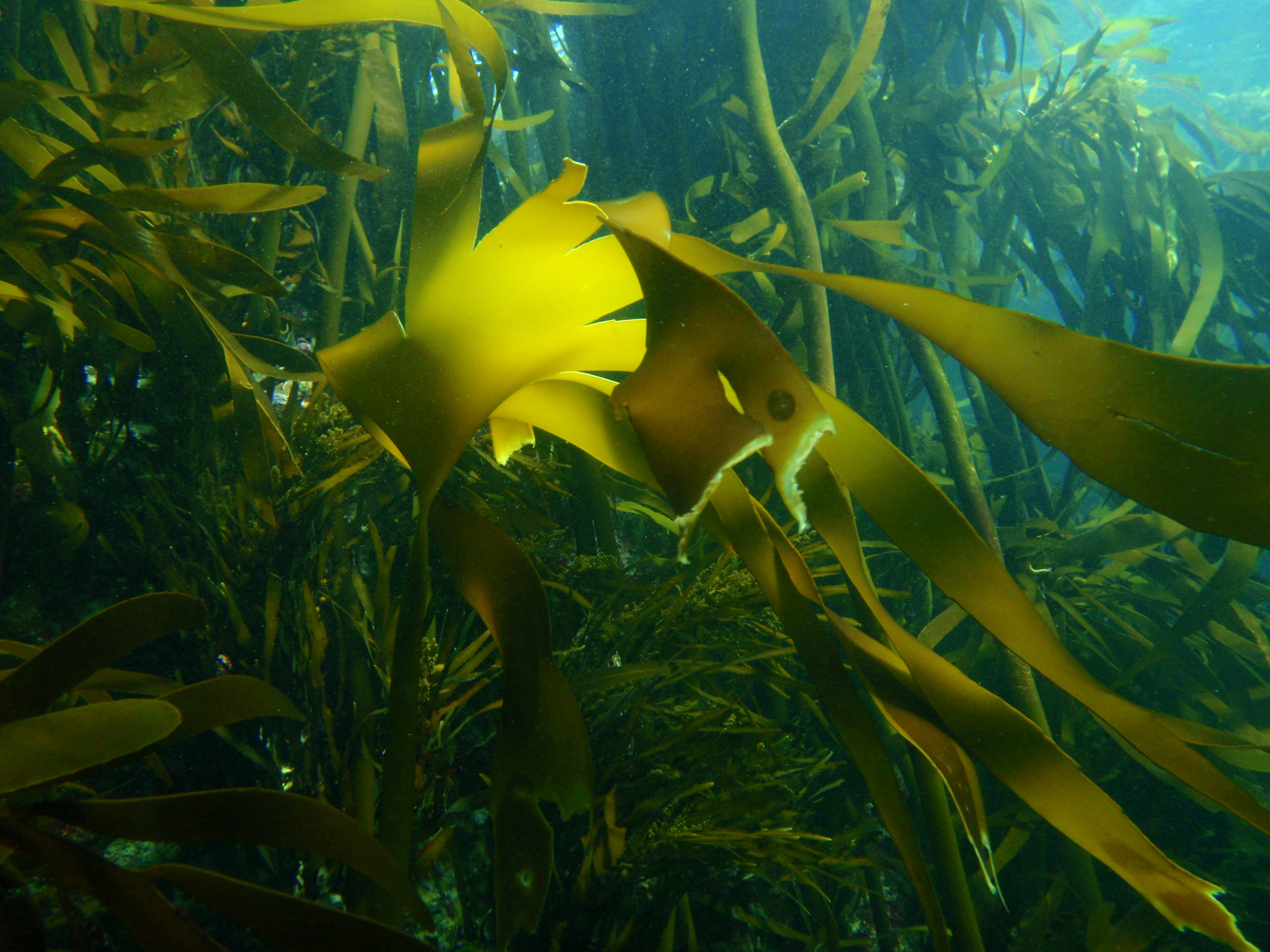
- Dense kelp forest with understory at Partridge Point near Dave's Caves, Cape Peninsula

Scientific classification
- Domain: Eukaryota
- Clade: Sar
- Clade: Stramenopiles
- Clade: Gyrista
- Division: Ochrophyta; Cavalier-Smith 1986, emend. Cavalier-Smith & Chao 1996

Type genus
- Ochromonas Vysotskij 1887

Subgroups
- Chrysista; Diatomista

Diversity
- 23,314 described species >100,000 estimated species

Synonyms
- Heterokontophyta Guiry, Andersen & Moestrup 2023; Ochrista Cavalier-Smith 1986; Stramenochromes Leipe et al. 1994

= Ochrophyte =

Ochrophytes Temporal range: Middle Proterozoic 1000–0 Ma

Phylum of algae

Ochrophytes, also known as heterokontophytes or stramenochromes, are a phylum of algae. They are the photosynthetic stramenopiles, a group of eukaryotes, organisms with a cell nucleus, characterized by the presence of two unequal flagella, one of which has tripartite hairs called mastigonemes. In particular, they are characterized by photosynthetic organelles or plastids enclosed by four membranes, with membrane-bound compartments called thylakoids organized in piles of three, chlorophyll a and c as their photosynthetic pigments, and additional pigments such as β-carotene and xanthophylls. Ochrophytes are one of the most diverse lineages of eukaryotes, containing ecologically important algae such as brown algae and diatoms. They are classified either as phylum Ochrophyta, Heterokontophyta or as subphylum Ochrophytina within phylum Gyrista. Their plastids are of red algal origin.

== Etymology ==
Throughout history, different names have been used to describe photosynthetic stramenopiles. The more widely used name is the phylum —or division, in botanical nomenclature— Ochrophyta, based on the golden alga Ochromonas. This name was first coined by evolutionary biologist Thomas Cavalier-Smith in 1986 as Ochrista, later renamed to Ochrophyta to comply with the recommendations of the International Code of Botanical Nomenclature. In 2018, the same author lowered it to a subphylum inside phylum Gyrista, and modified the name to Ochrophytina to match the -phytina suffix used for botanical subdivisions. Despite this, Ochrophyta is preferred over Ochrophytina by the scientific community.

The alternative name Heterokontophyta is more familiar among phycologists. The origin of this name is the class Heterokontæ (from Greek hetero 'different' and kontos 'pole'), introduced by Finnish biologist Alexander Ferdinand Luther in 1899 to include yellow-green freshwater algae, now part of Xanthophyceae and Raphidophyceae. This name referenced, among other traits, the two unequal flagella characteristic of all stramenopiles, also known as heterokonts. Eventually it was expanded to include more algae and became the division Heterokontophyta, coined by Christiaan van den Hoek in 1978 (Note: The name 'Heterokontophyta', as established in 1978 by van den Hoek, was not validly published. Before 2011, under the International Code of Botanical Nomenclature, a valid publication of a taxon required a description in Latin. Although after 2011 this was no longer a requirement, the change was not retroactive. In 2023, phycologists Michael Guiry, Øjvind Moestrup and Robert Andersen validated it.) and used to describe all photosynthetic stramenopiles.

== Characteristics ==
Ochrophytes are eukaryotic organisms composed of cells that are either naked or covered by scales, lorica or a cell wall. They can be single-celled, colonial, coenocytic or multicellular. Some Phaeophyceae (brown algae, seaweeds) develop as large multicellular thalli with differentiated tissues. All ochrophytes uniformly have tubular mitochondrial cristae. This is a common trait shared with their relatives, heterotrophic stramenopiles, as well as other closely related groups such as Rhizaria, Telonemia and Alveolata. As primarily photosynthetic eukaryotes, they are considered algae, distinguished from other groups of algae by specific morphological and ultrastructural traits, such as their flagella, chloroplasts and pigments.

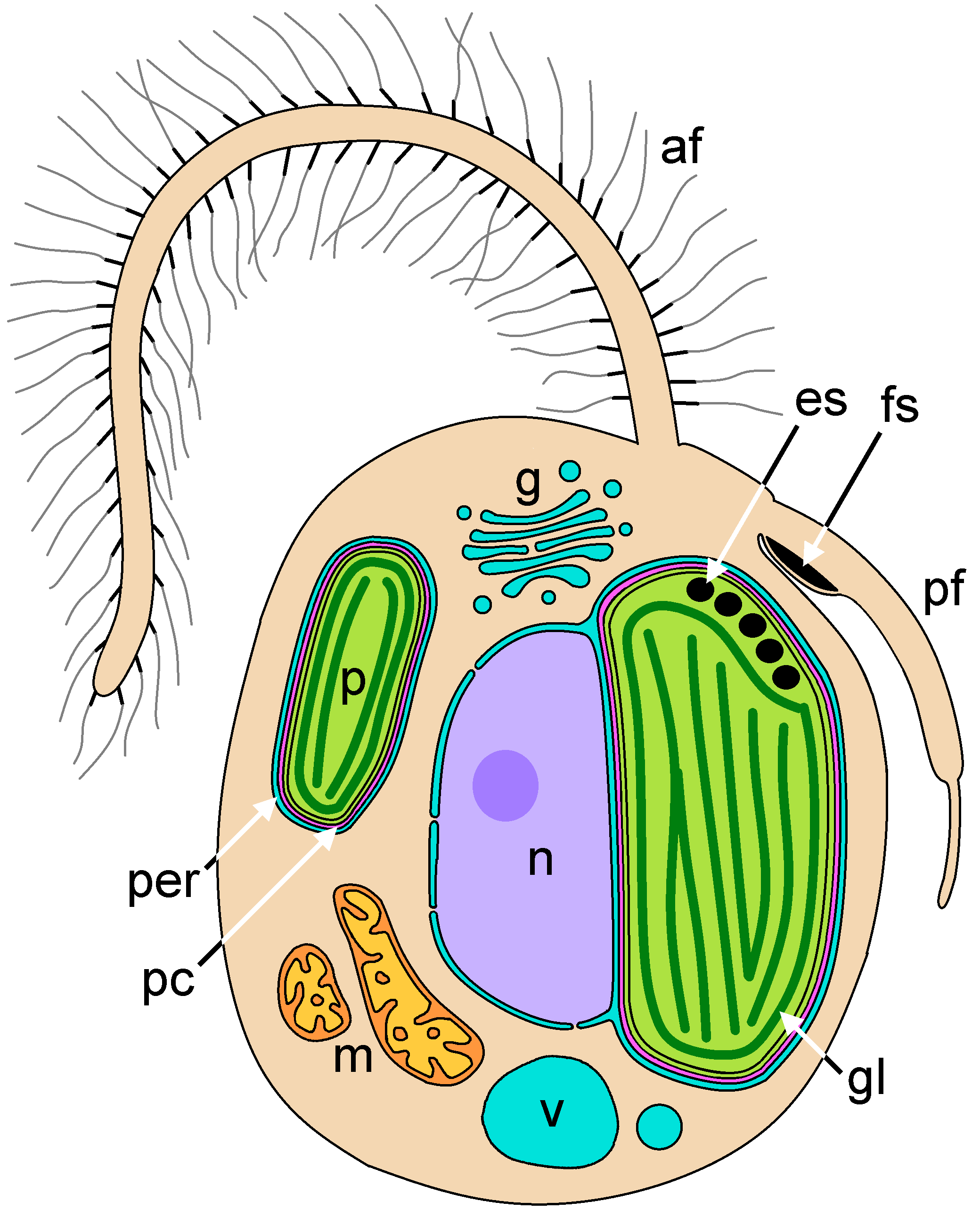
Diagram of a simplified ochrophyte cell showing the different compartments. af, anterior flagellum; es, eyespot; fs, flagellar swelling; g, Golgi apparatus; gl, girdle lamella; m, mitochondria (in orange); n, nucleus (in purple, nucleolus in darker purple); p, plastid (stroma in light green, thylakoids in dark green); pc, periplastidial compartment (in pink); per, periplastidial endoplasmic reticulum (in blue); pf, posterior flagellum; v, vacuole.

=== Flagella ===
As stramenopiles (=heterokonts), their swimming cells frequently display two markedly unequal flagella: an anterior flagellum ("tinsel") with straw-like hollow tripartite hairs called mastigonemes, and an immature posterior smooth flagellum ("whiplash") lacking these hairs. The ciliary transition zone of the flagellum generally has a transitional helix.

=== Chloroplasts ===
The ochrophytes are mostly photosynthetic. As such, they may possess one or more photosynthetic plastids (chloroplasts) per cell. Some groups contain species with leucoplasts, chloroplasts that have lost photosynthetic capacity and pigments but presumably continue to play a role in the synthesis of amino acids, lipids and heme groups. Ochrophytes have a distinct plastid ultrastructure in comparison to other algal groups. Their chloroplasts originate from an event of secondary endosymbiosis from a red alga, which lead to four (Note: The only known exception is Chrysoparadoxa, which contains chloroplasts surrounded by two membranes as opposed to four.) surrounding membranes: two inner membranes, corresponding to the primary plastid membranes; a third membrane, corresponding to the plasma membrane of the red alga; and an outermost layer, corresponding to the phagosome membrane. This characteristic differentiates them from archaeplastid algae (glaucophytes, red algae and green algae), whose chloroplasts have only two membranes. The two outer layers of ochrophyte plastids are contiguous with the endoplasmic reticulum (ER), together composing the chloroplast endoplasmic reticulum (CER), also known as the periplastidial endoplasmic reticulum (PER), which is often connected to the nuclear envelope. The tripartite flagellar hairs, characteristic of stramenopiles, are produced within either the PER or the nuclear envelope.

The periplastid compartment (PC), between the second and third layers, is a separate region that in other algal groups (i.e. cryptomonads and chlorarachniophytes) contains a nucleomorph, the vestigial nucleus of the secondary endosymbiont; however, no nucleomorphs are known within the ochrophytes. Instead, other structures have been observed within the PC, similarly to those seen in haptophytes and chromerid algae: "blob-like structures" where PC proteins are localized, and a vesicular network. Within the CER, there is a prominent region of tight direct contacts between the periplastid membrane and the inner nuclear envelope, where lipid transfers might occur, and perhaps exchange of other molecules.

Commonly, within the plastid stroma, three stacked thylakoids differentiate into the "girdle lamella", which runs around the periphery of the plastid, beneath the innermost membrane. The remaining thylakoids are arranged in stacks of three. In synchromophytes and aurearenophytes, a consortium of several plastids, each surrounded by two or three inner membranes respectively, is enveloped by a shared outer membrane.

=== Pigmentation ===
Chemical structure of fucoxanthin

Ochrophyte chloroplasts contain chlorophylls a and c as photosynthetic pigments, in addition to fucoxanthin. Chlorophyll a binds to thylakoids, while the c pigment is present in the stroma. The most frequent accessory pigment in ochrophytes is the yellow β-carotene. The golden-brown or brown pigmentation in diatoms, brown algae, golden algae and others is conferred by the xanthophyll fucoxanthin. In the yellow-green or yellow-brown raphidophyceans, eustigmatophyceans and xanthophyceans, vaucheriaxanthin is dominant instead. These pigment combinations extend their photosynthetic ability beyond chlorophyll a alone. Additionally, xanthophylls protect the photosystems from high intensity light.

=== Storage products ===
Ochrophyte algae accumulate chrysolaminarin, a carbohydrate consisting of short chains of β-1,3-linked glucose molecules, as a storage product. It is stored in vesicles located within the cytoplasm, outside plastids, unlike other algae. Cytoplasmic lipid droplets are also common. They lack starch, which is the common storage product in green algae and plants.

== Diversity ==
According to a 2024 survey, photosynthetic stramenopiles include 23,314 described species, with 490 species of uncertain position. However, they may amount to more than 100,000 estimated species, of which the majority are diatoms. They are divided into the following classes:

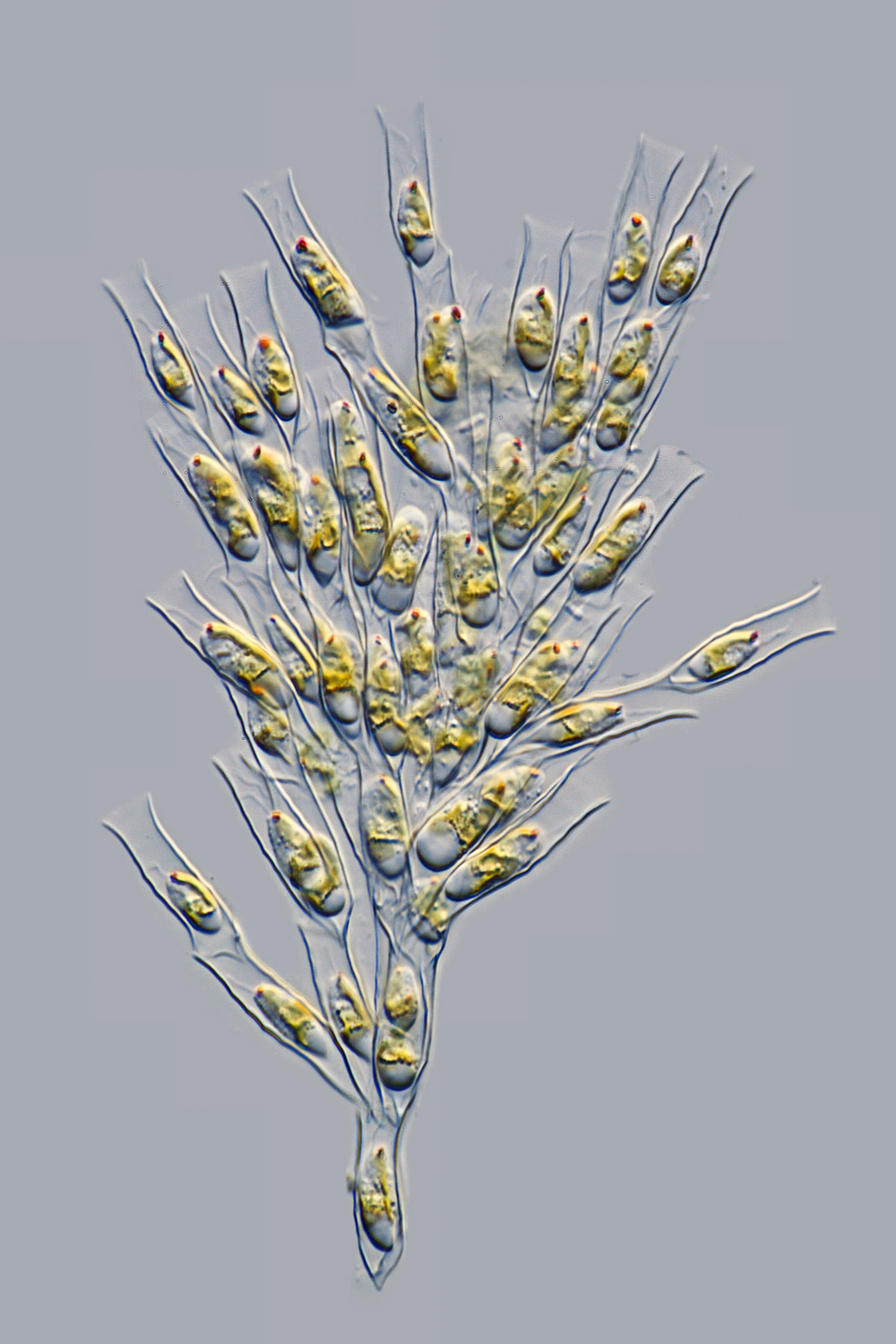
Dinobryon (Chrysophyceae)

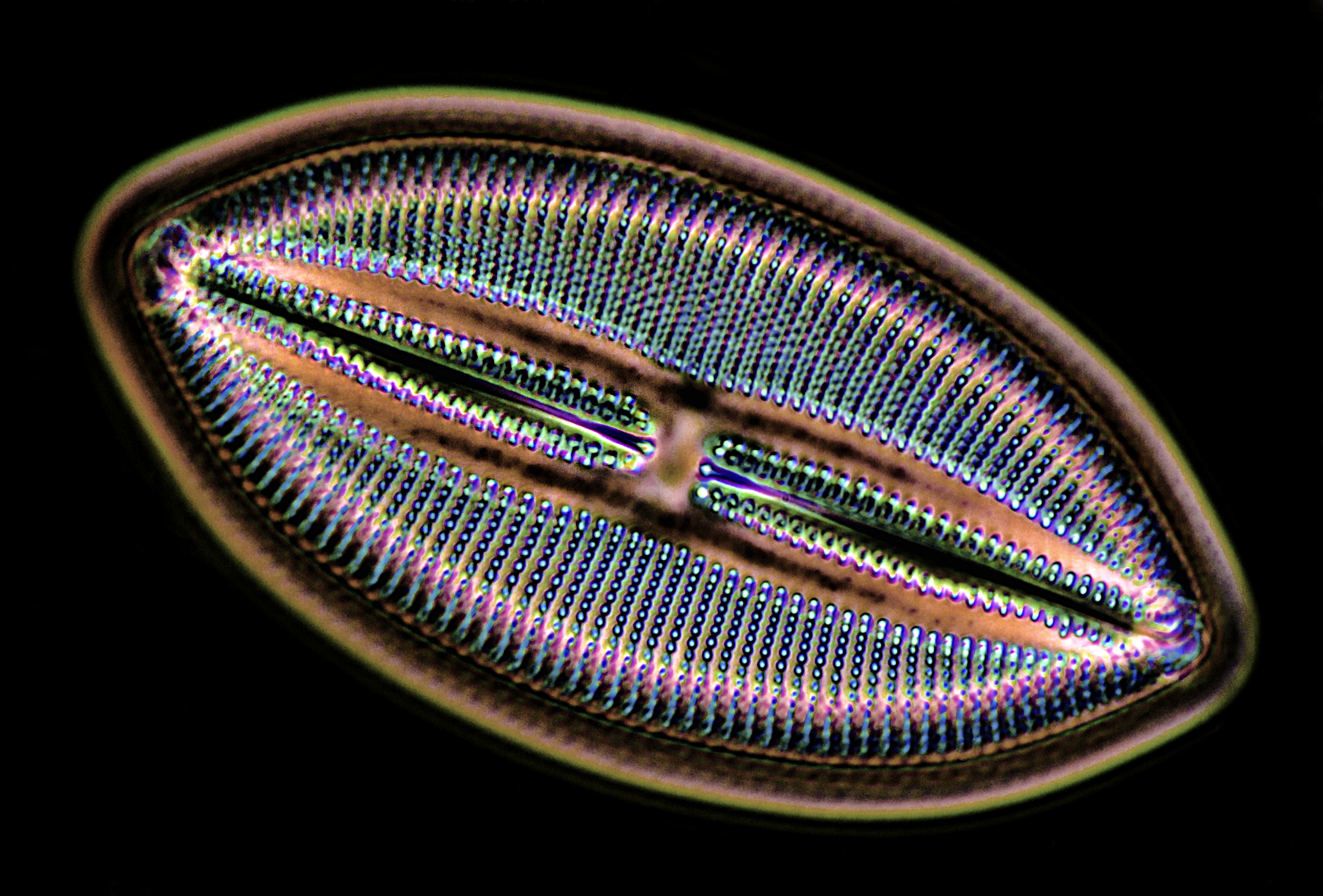
Lyrella (Diatomeae)

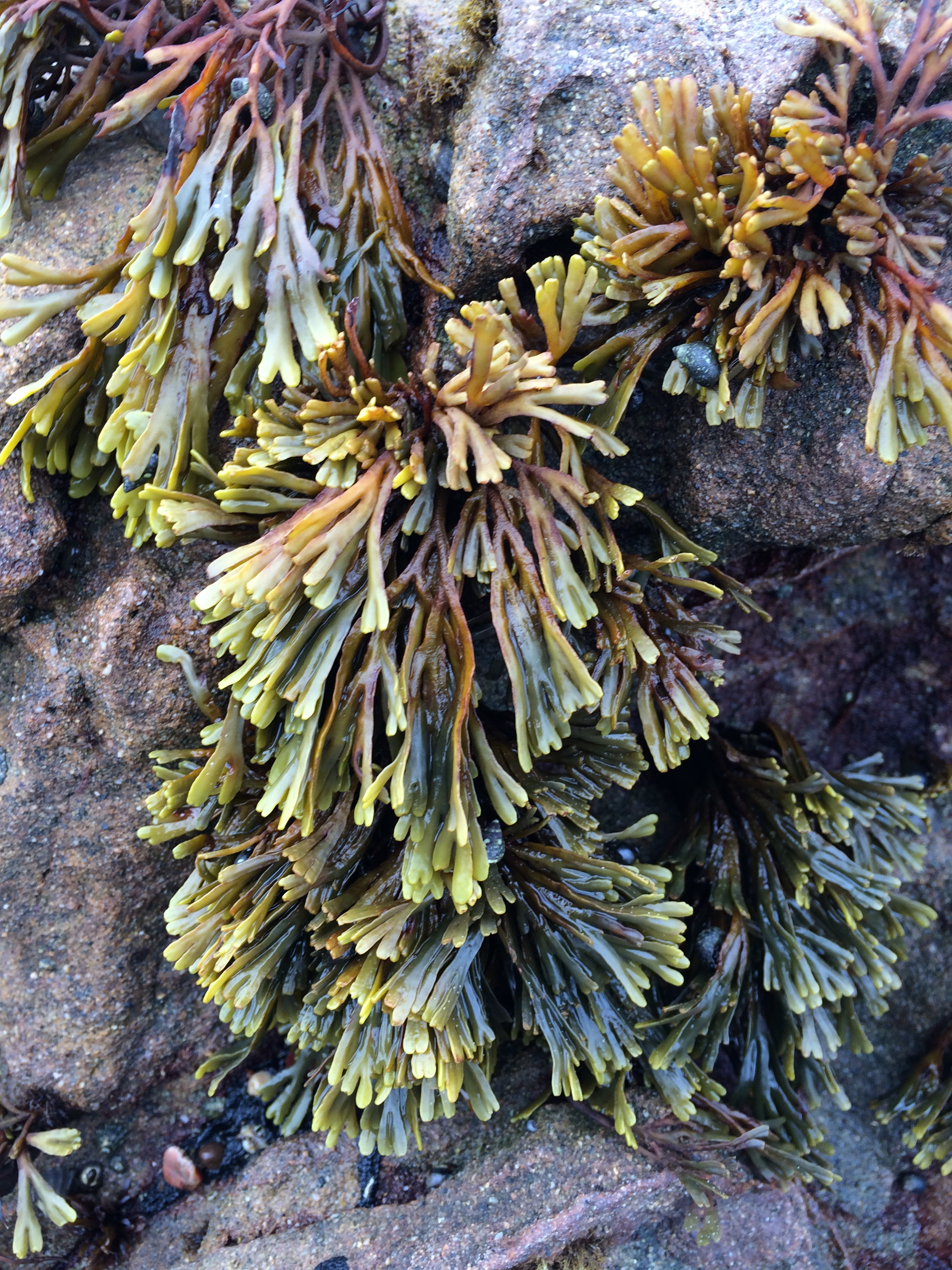
Pelvetiopsis (Phaeophyceae)

- Aurearenophyceae – One species of unicellular marine algae, Aurearena cruciata. Cells alternate between a naked, swimming stage and a non-motile stage covered in a cell wall.
- Bolidophyceae – 18 species of marine unicellular algae that may be naked and flagellated, or spherical and silicified, covered in silica "shields".
- Chrysoparadoxophyceae – One enigmatic species of sand-dwelling unicellular algae, Chrysoparadoxa australica. Cells have been observed covered in cell walls, from which they escape as naked zoospores instead of dividing. They are exceptional for only having two chloroplast membranes.
- Chrysophyceae – Commonly known as golden algae, they amount to 1,274 species of freshwater or terrestrial algae with diverse morphologies: unicellular, colonial, amoeboid, capsoid, and coccoid. A considerable portion are colorless heterotrophs. Cells may be naked or covered by cell walls, organic loricas, scales made of organic or siliceous material, or even be embedded in mucilage.
- Diatomeae (Note: Since 2019, diatoms do not form a single class, but numerous classes to reflect the phylogenetic advances over the previous decade.) – The diatoms are the most species-rich ochrophyte group, with 14,684 described species that occupy freshwater, marine, and terrestrial ecosystems. Primarily unicellular, with some forming colonies consisting of chains of cells. They are known for their two overlapping silica frustules that cover each cell.
- Dictyochophyceae – 217 species of mostly unicellular algae, which may be naked or covered in organic scales, and exhibit shapes from amoeboid to radially symmetrical. Some, known as silicoflagellates, grow basket-like silica skeletons that hold the cytoplasm.
- Eustigmatophyceae – 218 species of unicellular coccoid algae covered by cell walls, present in freshwater, terrestrial, and less frequently marine habitats. They lack the girdle lamella characteristic of all other ochrophytes. Both chlorophyll c and fucoxanthin is absent. They are known for their large eyespot, which lies outside the chloroplast.
- Olisthodiscophyceae – Two marine unicellular flagellated species with flattened gliding cells that live close to the substrate. They have been observed in various shallow marine habitats.
- Pelagophyceae – 31 species of marine flagellates characterised by a dense perforated theca. Many have highly reduced flagellar apparatuses.
- Phaeophyceae – Commonly known as brown algae, they are the second most species-rich group, with 2,124 primarily marine species. They are multicellular algae that exhibit tissue differentiation and a complex polysaccharide metabolism. Cells are covered in cell walls composed of cellulose, alginates, and other polymers.
- Phaeosacciophyceae – Eight species of unicellular, colonial, filamentous or thallic forms, typically covered with cell walls. They can be freshwater, marine, or soil-dwelling.
- Phaeothamniophyceae – 31 species of filamentous, pseudofilamentous, coccoid or capsoid algae, previously classified as golden algae and xanthophytes. Cells are covered in cell walls and surrounded by a gelatinous envelope.
- Picophagea – One species of tiny marine heterotrophic flagellates, Picophagus flagellatus.
- Pinguiophyceae – Five species of either flagellated or nonmotile unicellular marine algae, with an unusually high amount of fatty acids.
- Raphidophyceae – 58 species of marine and freshwater unicellular flagellated algae. Their cells are covered with multiple surface structures, such as mucocysts and trichocysts.
- Schizocladiophyceae – One species of filamentous alga, Schizocladia ischiensis. It is similar to the filamentous Phaeophyceae, but distinguished by the absence of cellulose in its cell wall, and the absence of intercellular cytoplasmic connections.
- Synchromophyceae – Five species of marine unicellular algae without flagella, that can join to form meroplasmodia. Some are colorless. One genus, Synchroma, has unique chloroplast complexes.
- Xanthophyceae – 616 species of algae with an unusual yellow-green coloration. Some are macroscopic, either filamentous or siphonous, while others are single-celled and coccoid.

== Reproduction ==
Ochrophytes are capable of asexual reproduction by fragmentation, propagules, vegetative cell division, sporogenesis or zoosporogenesis. In addition, they are capable of sexual reproduction through gametes, by three different modes: isogamy, anisogamy or oogamy.

== Ecology ==
Ochrophytes are present in nearly all environments. Some classes are more common in marine habitats, while others are more frequent in freshwater or soil. Among the ochrophyte lineages are the diatoms, the most abundant photosynthetic eukaryotes worldwide in marine habitats; multicellular seaweeds, such as brown algae (e.g., kelp) and golden algae; and an array of microscopic single-celled lineages that are also abundant, as evidenced by environmental sequencing. Regarding nutrition, various ochrophytes are mixotrophic, usually through phagocytosis.

=== Marine ===
Several classes of heterokont algae are exclusively known from marine habitats, such as Bolidophyceae, Pelagophyceae, Pinguiophyceae and Schizocladiophyceae. The brown algae (Phaeophyceae) are almost exclusively marine, with very few freshwater genera.

=== Freshwater ===
Chrysophyceae, Phaeothamniophyceae and Xanthophyceae are predominantly freshwater classes. In lotic habitats (rivers, streams), golden algae (Chrysophyceae) and yellow-green algae (Xanthophyceae) are common and occasionally abundant. The golden algal genus Hydrurus, in particular, can be widespread in some drainage basins and is common in cold, clear, fast-flowing mountain streams, where it attaches to a firm substrate. Xanthophycean genera commonly found in rivers include Vaucheria, Tribonema and Bumilleria, either freely floating or attached to filamentous algae and plants. Diatoms are more diverse, with more than 60 genera commonly found in rivers. Many river diatoms have developed different strategies to attach to the substrate to avoid being displaced by water currents. The most basic strategy is to produce extracellular polymeric substances, varied carbohydrate structures formed from the cell membrane. In faster-flowing waters, some diatoms (e.g., Cocconeis) grow directly attached to the substrate through adhesive films. Others (e.g., Eunotia, Nitzschia) grow stalks or colonial tubes capable of reaching higher into the water column to acquire more nutrients. Brown algae (Phaeophyceae), although highly diversified, contain only seven species present in rivers. These lack any complex multicellular thalli, and instead exist as benthic filamentous forms that have evolved independently from marine ancestors.

=== Harmful algae ===
Two main lineages of photosynthetic stramenopiles include many toxic species. Within the class Raphidophyceae, strains of Heterosigma and Chattonella at high concentrations are responsible for fish mortality, although the nature and action of their toxins is not resolved. Freshwater Gonyostomum species are capable of mucilage secretion at high amounts detrimental to fish gills. Within the diatoms (Bacillariophyta), harmful effects can be due to physical damage or to toxin production. Centric diatoms like Chaetoceros live as colonial chains of cells with long spines (setae) that can clog fish gills, causing their death. Among diatoms, the only toxin producers have been found among pennate diatoms, almost entirely within the genus Pseudonitzschia. More than a dozen species of Pseudonitzschia are capable of producing a neurotoxin, domoic acid, the cause of amnesiac shellfish poisoning.

== Evolution ==
=== External ===
The ochrophytes constitute a highly diverse clade within Stramenopila, a eukaryotic supergroup that also includes several heterotrophic lineages of protists such as oomycetes, hyphochytrids, labyrinthuleans, opalines and bicosoecids. This lineage of stramenopiles originated from an event of secondary endosymbiosis where a red alga was transformed into the chloroplast of the common ancestor of ochrophytes.

The total group of ochrophytes is estimated to have evolved between 874 and 543 million years ago (Ma) through molecular clock inference. However, the earliest fossil remains, assigned to the billion-year-old xanthophyte Palaeovaucheria, suggest that ochrophytes had appeared by 1000 Ma. Other early putative representatives of photosynthetic stramenopiles are Jacutianema (750 Ma), Germinosphaera (750–700 Ma) and the brown alga Miaohephyton (600–550 Ma). Scales similar to modern chrysophyte scales, and valves resembling the modern centric diatom valves, have been found in 800–700 million-years-old sediments.

=== Internal ===
- - Chrysista
    - SII
      - - - - Chrysophyceae
            - Synchromophyceae
          - Picophagea
        - Actinophryidae
      - - Olisthodiscophyceae
        - Pinguiophyceae
    - - Eustigmatophyceae
      - SI
        - Raphidophyceae
        - PX
          - - - Xanthophyceae
              - Phaeobotrys
            - Chrysoparadoxophyceae
          - - - "Botrydiopsis" pyrenoidosa
              - - Phaeophyceae
                - Schizocladiophyceae
            - - Phaeosacciophyceae
              - - Aurearenophyceae
                - Phaeothamniophyceae
  - Diatomista SIII
    - - Pelagophyceae
      - Dictyochophyceae
    - Khakista
      - Bolidophyceae
      - Diatomeae

Ochrophyta phylogeny according to a 2025 multiprotein phylogenetic analysis.

Relationships among many classes of ochrophytes remain unresolved, but three main clades (called SI, SII and SIII) are supported in most phylogenetic analyses. The SI lineage, containing the diverse and multicellular class Phaeophyceae, or brown algae, experienced an evolutionary radiation during the late Paleozoic (around 310 million years ago). The class Schizocladiophyceae is the sister lineage to brown algae, followed by a clade of closely related classes Xanthophyceae, Phaeosacciophyceae and Chrysoparadoxophyceae. This is in turn the sister lineage to a clade containing Aurearenophyceae and Phaeothamniophyceae, which are sometimes treated as one class Aurophyceae. The Raphidophyceae are the most basal within the SI. The SII lineage contains the golden algae or Chrysophyceae, as well as smaller classes Eustigmatophyceae, Pinguiophyceae, Synchromophyceae and Picophagea. Both clades, SI and SII, compose the Chrysista lineage. The remaining classes are grouped within the sister lineage Diatomista, equivalent to the SIII lineage: these are the diatoms or Diatomeae, and three closely related classes Bolidophyceae, Dictyochophyceae (including the silicoflagellates) and Pelagophyceae. A new class of algae, Olisthodiscophyceae, was described in 2021 and recovered as part of the SII lineage.

One group of heterotrophic heliozoan protists, actinophryids, are included in a classification as sister lineage to Commation and both evolved from the raphidophytes, and three groups are treated as one class Raphidomonadea on the basis of 18S rDNA phylogenetic analyses. However, a 2022 phylogenomic study placed one actinophryid, Actinophrys sol, as the probable sister group to ochrophytes. Although it lacks chloroplasts, plastidial genes have been found in the nuclear genome of this actinophryid, implying that its common ancestor with ochrophytes may have already begun domesticating plastids. Later, a 2025 study recovered A. sol within the SII clade instead, implying that, much like the Picophagea, it evolved from ochrophytes that secondarily lost their chloroplasts.

== History of knowledge ==
=== Pre-Linnean ===
The first recorded stramenopile algae in history were the multicellular brown algae, such as kelp and other seaweeds. Their descriptions date back to early China (ca. 3000 BC), Japan (ca. 500 BC) and Greece (300 BC, such as Theophrastus). Knowledge of them likely predates recorded history, as they were potentially used by humans as a source for food, dyes, and medicine. They likely played a role in the early dispersal of humans along seashores, particularly from East Asia to the Americas, where brown algae may have formed a corridor rich in aquatic resources after deglaciation. This is known as the kelp highway hypothesis. The remaining stramenopile algae were not included in historical works, due to being microscopic.

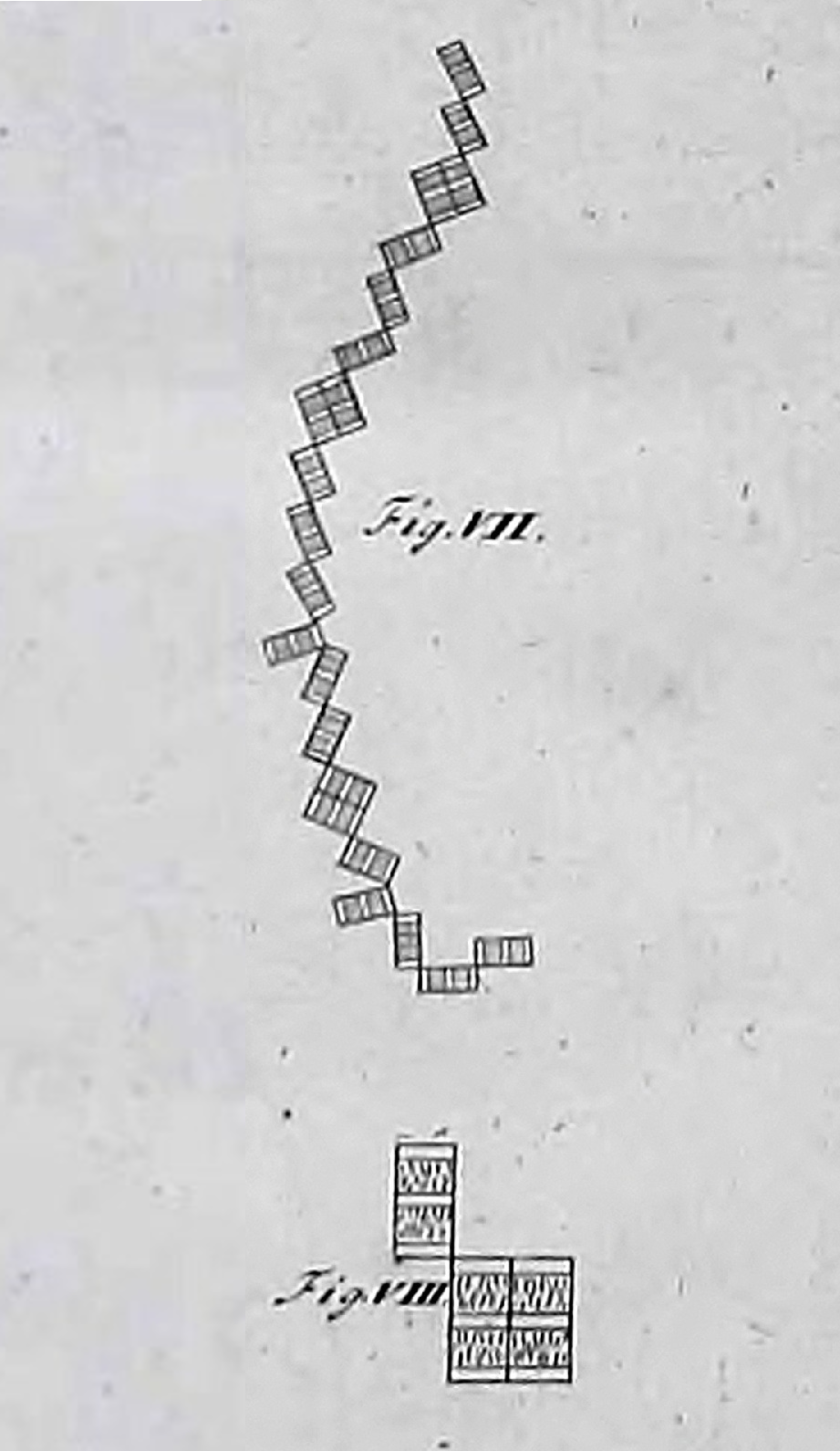
The first unequivocal illustration of a diatom, Tabellaria, from 1703.

In the late 17th century, Antony van Leeuwenhoek became the first person to observe microbes, but he did not record microscopic stramenopiles. The first unmistakeable descriptions of diatoms belong to two illustrations published anonymously in England in 1703, 80 years before the first taxonomic description of a diatom. They are attributed to Charles King of Staffordshire.

=== Discovery period (1753–1882) ===
The first formal description of any stramenopile was by Carl Linnaeus in his 1753 work Species Plantarum, for the brown alga Fucus. In the following years, single-celled chrysophytes and diatoms were described for the first time by Otto Friedrich Müller. These descriptions started a century-long era of exploration, during which brown algae were described as plants, while microscopic algae were treated as animals under the name of infusoria. Xanthophytes were first described in 1801 by Augustin Pyramus de Candolle, and raphidophytes were discovered by Karl Moriz Diesing in 1865.

Influential works were published around that time, such as the 1813 work by French naturalist Jean Vincent Félix Lamouroux with the use of pigment color to classify algae. One of the most significant contributions was the 1838 publication by Christian Gottfried Ehrenberg, containing his observations of many stramenopiles under light microscopy. Still, these taxa remained separate from each other in the mind of taxonomists until the next period.

=== First synthesis period (1882–1914) ===
The 1882 work by M.J. Rostafinski was the first to hypothesize an evolutionary link between the diatoms, golden algae, and brown algae. Several authors later developed this idea through various publications, such as Carl Correns, Georg Klebs, and Ernst Lemmermann, and phylogenetic relationships between very different algal groups were discussed. This culminated in the 1900 phylogenetic study by Frederick Blackman, who hypothesized that complex multicellular algae evolved from simple flagellated algae, and that this happened independently in green algae (giving rise to plants) and golden algae (giving rise to brown algae and diatoms). In 1914, Adolf Pascher published a synthesis where he did not fully accept the evolutionary relationships between stramenopile algae. Pascher instead separated the Chrysophyta (including golden algae, xanthophytes and diatoms) and the Phaeophyta (brown algae alone).

=== Floristic period (1914–1950) ===
During the following period, evolutionary discussions were mostly abandoned, because characters observed under light microscopy were insufficient to resolve evolutionary relationships. But many species were described.

During the 20th century, evolutionary and phylogenetic discussions began including heterokont algae. Transmission electron microscopy and molecular phylogenetic analysis led to the description of many new groups and several classes well into the 21st century. The sequencing of the first ochrophyte genome, belonging to Thalassiosira pseudonana, began in 2002.
