= Chromulina elegans =

Scientific classification
- Domain: Eukaryota
- Clade: Diaphoretickes
- Clade: SAR
- Clade: Stramenopiles
- Phylum: Gyrista
- Subphylum: Ochrophytina
- Class: Chrysophyceae
- Order: Chromulinales
- Family: Chromulinaceae
- Genus: Chromulina
- Species: C. elegans

Binomial name
- Chromulina elegans Doflein 1923

Species of alga

Chromulina elegans is a species of golden algae in the family Chromulinaceae. It is found in freshwater, in Europe, South America and Asia.
