= Chrysococcus elegans =

Scientific classification
- Domain: Eukaryota
- Clade: Diaphoretickes
- Clade: SAR
- Clade: Stramenopiles
- Phylum: Gyrista
- Subphylum: Ochrophytina
- Class: Chrysophyceae
- Order: Chromulinales
- Family: Dinobryaceae
- Genus: Chrysococcus
- Species: C. elegans

Binomial name
- Chrysococcus elegans (Doflein) Bourrelly 1957

Synonyms
- Chrysococcocystis elegans Doflein

Species of alga

Chrysococcus elegans is a species of golden algae in the family Dinobryaceae. It is a freshwater species found in North America, specifically the Northwest Territories in Canada.
