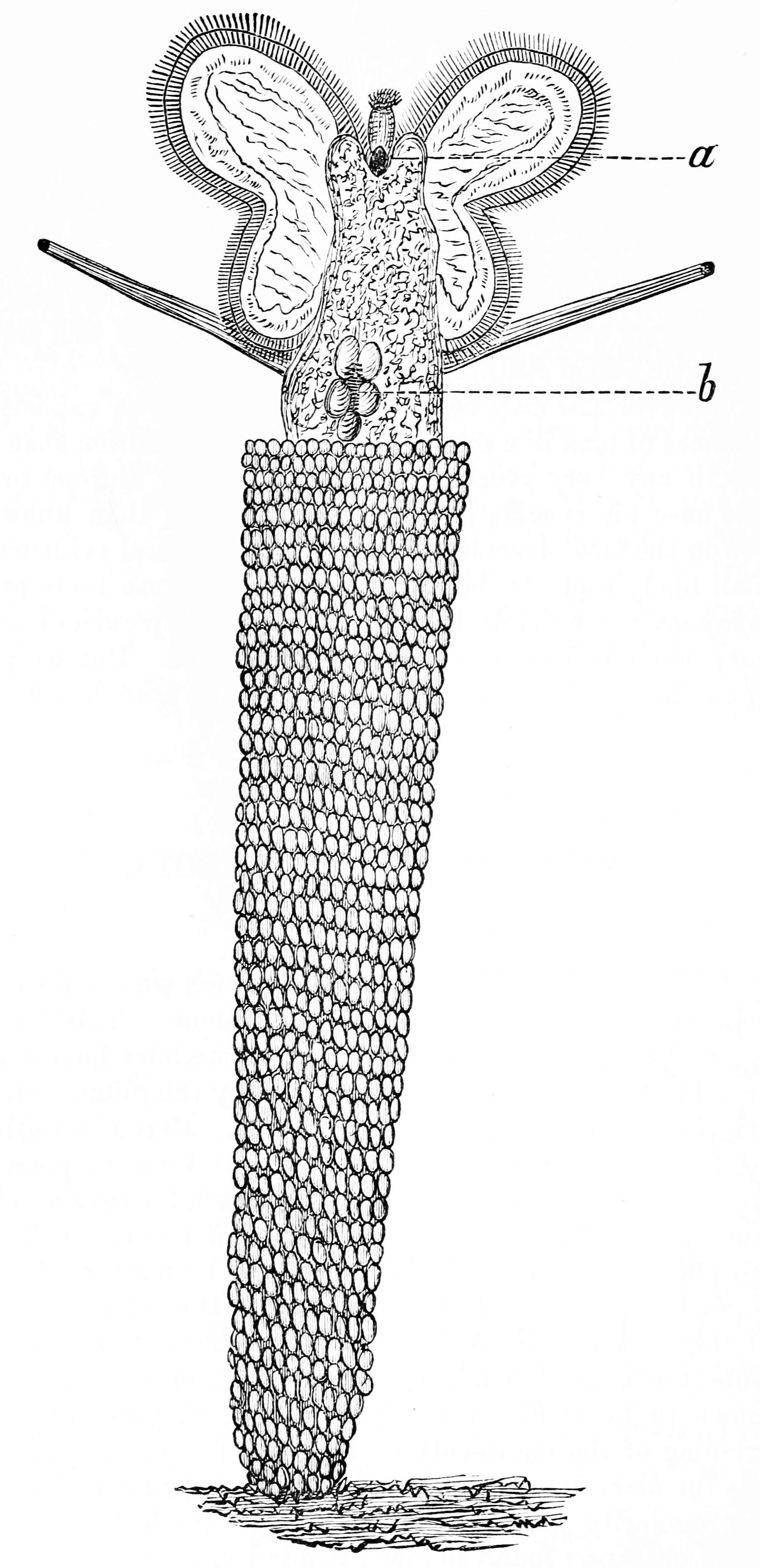

Scientific classification
- Kingdom: Animalia
- Phylum: Rotifera
- Class: Monogononta
- Order: Flosculariaceae
- Family: Flosculariidae
- Genus: Floscularia
- Species: F. ringens

Binomial name
- Floscularia ringens (Linnaeus, 1758)

= Floscularia ringens =

Species of rotifers

Floscularia ringens is a species of rotifer belonging to the class Monogononta, which resides in a tube that it builds using many little circular pellets consisting of bacteria and small pieces of detritus.

The name Floscularia was inspired by the flower-like shape of the organism.

Floscularia ringens grows to around 1.5 millimeters long and resides in freshwater locations, where it makes its small tube by connecting to the bottom of the leaves of water lilies. It retreats into its tube when it is bothered.

== Feeding behavior ==
Floscularia ringens brings in food using water currents made with quickly moving cilia. The quick, simultaneous movement of the two lobes consisting of cilia looks like little turning wheels.

== Reproduction and development ==
Adult Floscularia ringens make parthenogenetic eggs that are kept in the tube. After the eggs hatch, the young stay in the maternal tube for a little time to finish developing before swimming off. A young Floscularia ringens has a cone-shaped body, short foot, little corona, and mastax with trophi, but it still seems to not be able to eat. In less than one day, the young Floscularia ringens makes a lasting connection to a substrate. Its corona now has four lobes, and the foot lengthens. After the corona develops the Floscularia ringens starts to eat through making currents, and it also begins to create its tube.

== Moment of fame ==
A close-up image of Floscularia ringens came first place in the 2011 Olympus BioScapes Digital Imaging Competition that presents movies and photographs of life science images. The photograph depicts Floscularia ringens' feeding method, showing its quickly moving cilia which pulls in water consisting food. Charles Krebs, the photographer of this image of Floscularia ringens, had his picture chosen out of the 2,000 submissions to the 2011 competition, earning him Olympus imaging equipment valued at $5,000. Charles Krebs captured his photograph of Floscularia ringens using a method called differential interference contrast microscopy.
