= Stylobryon =

Scientific classification
- Domain: Eukaryota
- Clade: Diaphoretickes
- Clade: SAR
- Clade: Stramenopiles
- Phylum: Gyrista
- Subphylum: Ochrophytina
- Class: Chrysophyceae
- Order: Chromulinales
- Family: Dinobryaceae
- Genus: Stylobryon; Fromentel
- Species: S. insignis

Binomial name
- Stylobryon insignis Fromental, 1874

Genus of algae

Stylobryon is a monotypic genus of golden algae in the family Dinobryaceae. It has one known species Stylobryon insignis Fromental, 1874.

Stylobryon has been found in numerous lakes, notably Lake Erie.

In 1866, Alfred Cheatham Stokes, described Stylobryon abbottii in North America. This is now accepted as Poteriodendron petiolatum var. abbottii (A.Stokes) Playfair, 1921.
