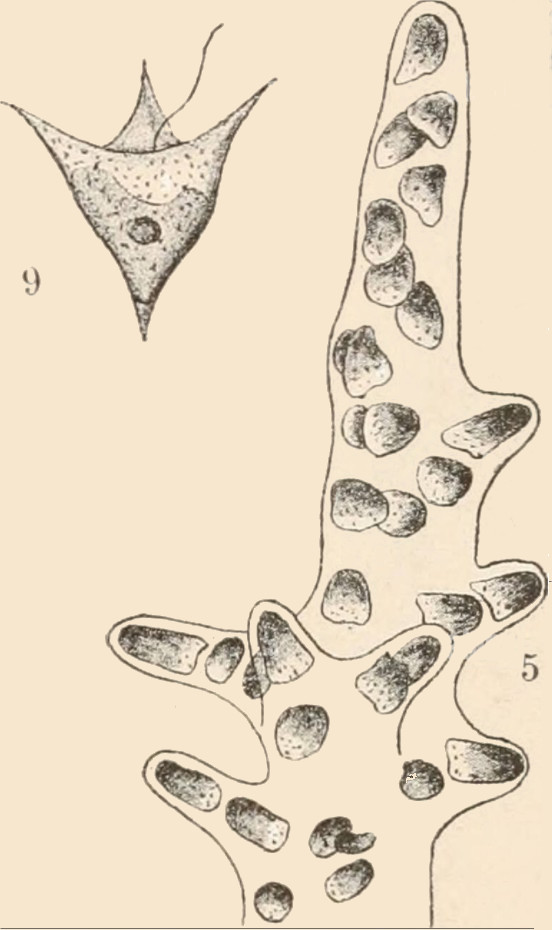
- Tetrahedral spore (left) and cells growing in a thallus (right) of Hydrurus foetidus published circa 1885

Scientific classification
- Domain: Eukaryota
- Clade: Diaphoretickes
- Clade: SAR
- Clade: Stramenopiles
- Phylum: Gyrista
- Subphylum: Ochrophytina
- Class: Chrysophyceae
- Order: Hydrurales
- Family: Hydruraceae
- Genus: Hydrurus
- Species: H. foetidus

Binomial name
- Hydrurus foetidus (Villars) Trevisan

= Hydrurus foetidus =

Species of alga

Hydrurus foetidus is a large freshwater alga found in a cold rivers. It is a member of the chrysophytes, or golden algae.

== Distribution ==
H. foetidus is found in cold, fast flowing rivers typically during times of snowmelt. It is found globally north of 40° N and south of 40° S. It has been reported in South and North America, Russia, Japan, the Himalayas and in Hope Bay, Antarctica.
