= Pedetes (disambiguation) =

Pedetes primarily refers to Pedetes Illiger, 1811, the genus of the two extant springhare species.

The term has also been proposed for four different genera, but is relegated to junior synonym status:

- Pedetes Creutzer, 1799, a manuscript name and a synonym of Orchestes, a genus of weevils
- Pedetes Kirby, 1837, a synonym of Agriotes, a genus of click beetles
- Pedetes Gosse, 1886, a synonym of Filinia, a genus of rotifers
- Pedetes Faust, 1894, replaced with Pedetinus Faust, 1895, a genus of Central and South American weevils
