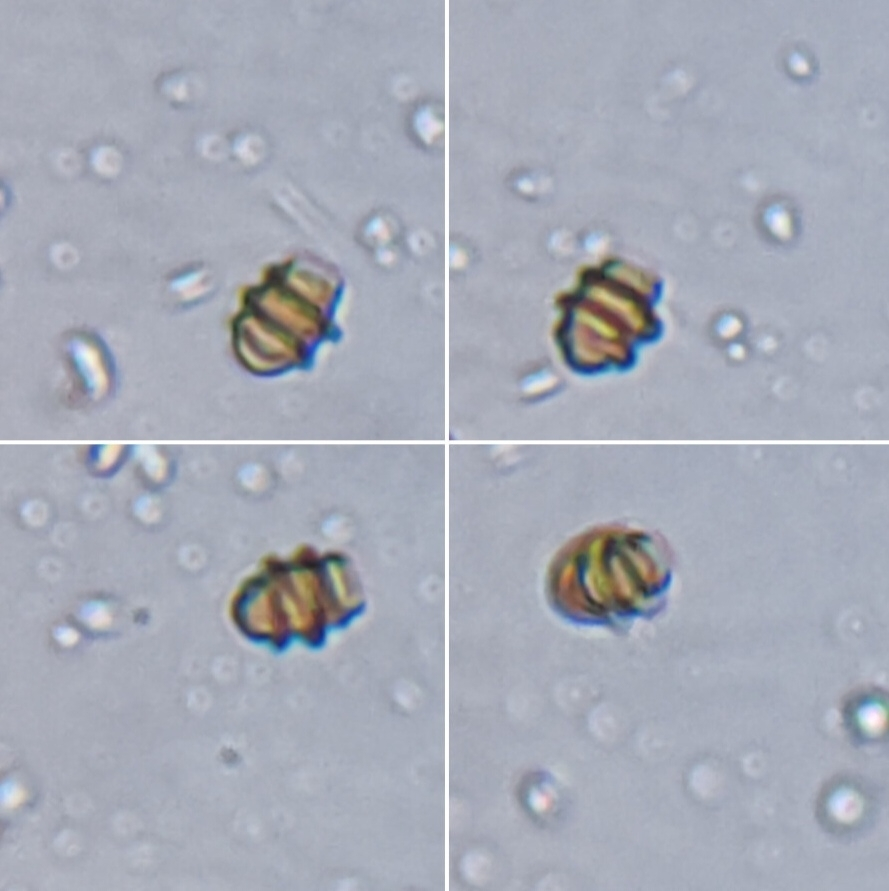
- Kephyrion spirale

Scientific classification
- Domain: Eukaryota
- Clade: Sar
- Clade: Stramenopiles
- Division: Ochrophyta
- Class: Chrysophyceae
- Order: Chromulinales
- Family: Dinobryaceae
- Genus: Kephyrion; Pascher, 1911

= Kephyrion =

Genus of algae

Kephyrion is a genus of algae in the family Dinobryaceae.

== Species ==
The following species are recognised in the genus Kephyrion:

- Kephyrion aestivum Skvortzov
- Kephyrion amphorula Conrad
- Kephyrion ampulla (Skuja) Bourrelly
- Kephyrion annulatum De Graaf
- Kephyrion autumnale Skvortzov
- Kephyrion bacilliforme Conrad
- Kephyrion blatnense (Fott) Fott
- Kephyrion boreale Skuja
- Kephyrion brunneum Skvortzov
- Kephyrion campanuliforme Conrad
- Kephyrion circumvallatum (Schiller) Bourrelly
- Kephyrion colliferum de Graaf
- Kephyrion cordatum (Hilliard) Starmach
- Kephyrion crassum (Hilliard) Starmach
- Kephyrion cupuliforme Conrad
- Kephyrion densatum (Gerlinde Schmid) Bourrelly
- Kephyrion doliolum Conrad
- Kephyrion elegans (D.K.Hilliard) Starmach
- Kephyrion francevii Guseva
- Kephyrion globosum (Czosnowski) Bourrelly
- Kephyrion gracile (Hilliard) Starmach
- Kephyrion hilliardii Nicholls
- Kephyrion hispidum Skvortzov
- Kephyrion impletum Nygaard
- Kephyrion inconstans (Gerlinde Schmid) Bourrelly
- Kephyrion khmelevae Molinari & Guiry
- Kephyrion laticollis (Conrad) Bourrelly
- Kephyrion latum Skvortzov
- Kephyrion limneticum (D.K.Hilliard) Starmach
- Kephyrion littorale J.W.G.Lund
- Kephyrion mastigophorum Gerlinde Schmid
- Kephyrion matvienkoae Skvortzov
- Kephyrion moniliferum (Gerlinde Schmid) Bourrelly
- Kephyrion mosquense Guseva
- Kephyrion obliquum Hilliard
- Kephyrion ovale (Lackey) Huber-Pestalozzi
- Kephyrion ovum Pascher
- Kephyrion parvulum (G.Schmid) Bourrelly
- Kephyrion petasatum Conrad
- Kephyrion planktonicum Hilliard
- Kephyrion prismaticum Conrad
- Kephyrion productum (Hortobágyi) Starmach
- Kephyrion rubi-claustri Conrad
- Kephyrion schmidii Bourrelly
- Kephyrion sitta Pascher
- Kephyrion skujae H.Ettl
- Kephyrion spinosum Hada
- Kephyrion spirale (Lackey) Conrad
- Kephyrion starmachii (Czosnowski) Bourrelly ex Kapustin
- Kephyrion translucens Fott
- Kephyrion truncatum Skvortzov
- Kephyrion valkanovii Huber-Pestalozzi
- Kephyrion velatum Conrad
- Kephyrion welshii (Juriš) Starmach
