= Harp Lake (Ontario) =

Lake in Ontario, Canada

- Interactive map of Harp Lake
- Location: Ontario, Canada
- Coordinates: 45°22′46″N 79°08′06″W
- Type: Oligotrophic lake
- Catchment area: 4.7 km² (1.12 mi²)
- Basin countries: Canada
- Surface area: 710,000 m^{2} (7,600,000 sq ft)
- Average depth: 37.5 m (123 ft)
- Settlements: Near Dorset, Ontario

Harp Lake is an oligotrophic, single-basin lake in Ontario, Canada. The lake covers over 710,000 m^{2} and has a depth of 37.5 m. Harp Lake does have dimitic stratification and is a temperate lake. Additionally, Harp Lake does not have anaerobic conditions in the water column because it is a relatively deep lake. The water in Harp Lake has a pH of 6.3 (slightly acidic). This pH is caused by the presence of acids and the lack of alkaline bases.^{[3]} Slightly acidic lakes normally have a granite or siliceous bedrock and they are poorly buffered. Also, these lakes commonly have calcium-poor soils or thin soils.

It is one of the "Dorset lakes" near Dorset, Ontario, a small community located on the boundary between the Algonquin Highlands Township in Haliburton County, Ontario and Lake of Bays Municipality in Muskoka District, Canada.

== Ecology ==
=== Nutrient levels ===
The forested watershed area around Harp Lake is around 4.7 km^{2} and comprises six streams and shoreline runoff. There has been evidence that the total discharge of these six streams has decreased by 24.9% from 1978-2006. Four different concentrations of cations (Ca, K, Mg and Na) were observed in Harp Lake from 1978-2006. There was found to be a negative trend with the nutrients Ca, K and Mg concentrations while Na was found to increase over time. These two trends were correlated with stream base cation concentration, stream discharge and shoreline load. With each cation stream concentration and discharge were a key player with the trends while shoreline load (road salt) played a key role in the increase of Na. Specifically, Na increased between 250% and 350% as a result of road salt contamination.

Not only did Na concentrations increase because of road salt contamination but Cl concentrations also increased. Cl concentrations increased from 0.6 mg*L^{−1} to 2.7 mg*L^{−1}. While the increased levels of Na and Cl concentrations have caused localized impacts to occur near stream crossing there is a large dilution factor which has caused there to be little impact on the lake ecosystem. The Na and Cl concentrations are predicted to have little to no effect on soft-water organisms even though their tolerance to salt is low.

=== Oxygen levels ===
From 1975 to 1995 research was conducted to measure summer hypolimnetic oxygen levels. The hypolimnetic oxygen levels stayed persistently over 4 mg L^{−1} . Additionally, in 2010, researchers measured total mercury, methyl mercury, total organic carbon, sediment bulk density, redox potential and percent fines on a sediment core. The sediment core was collected from littoral to profundal depths along transects. Total mercury, total organic carbon, and total mercury:methyl mercury ratio decrease with sediment depth.

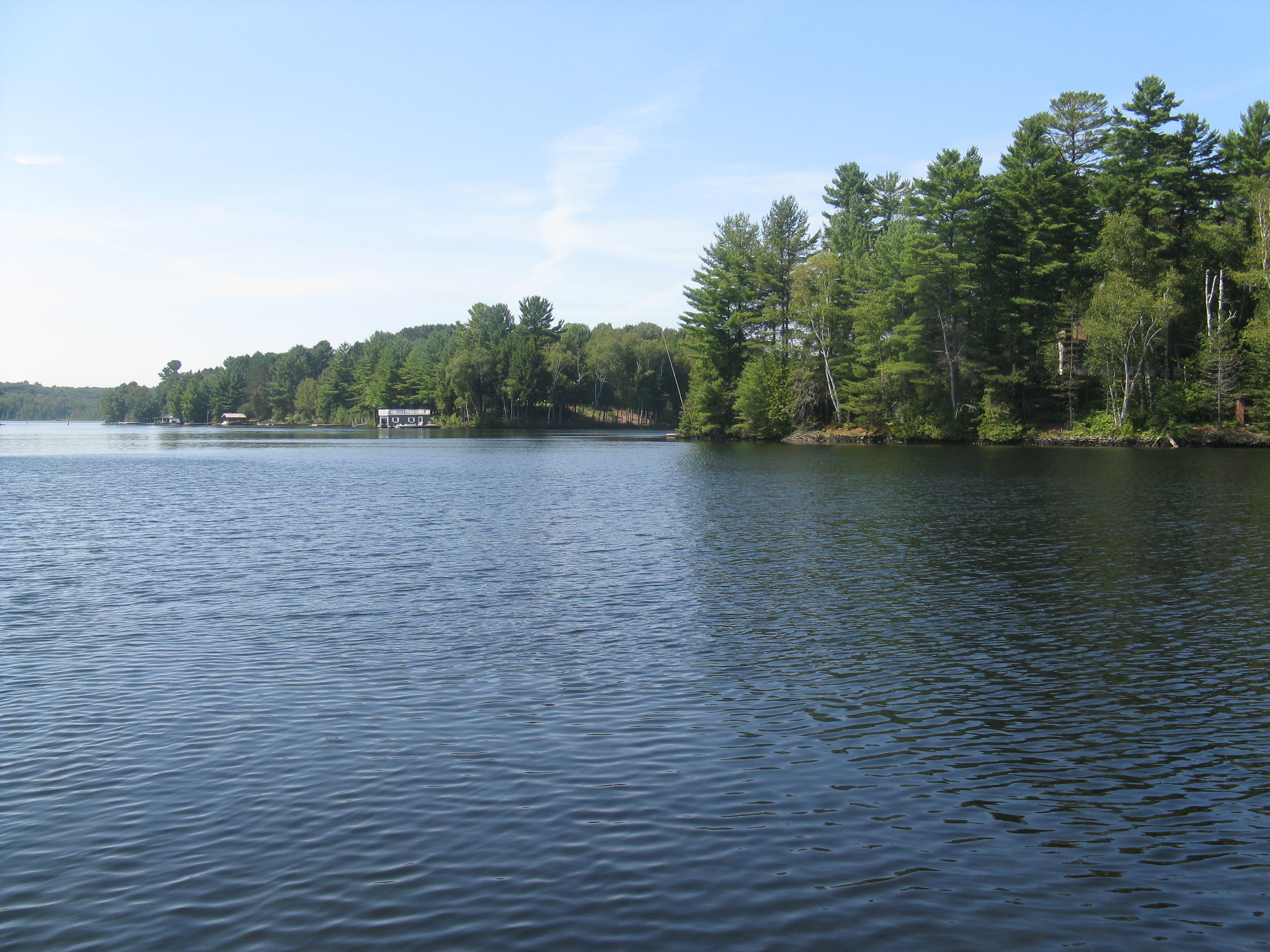
Muskoka River, Ontario Canada

== Geographic features ==
Harp Lake has been studied by the Dorset Environmental Science Centre since the 1970's. The Dorset Environmental Science Centre includes tributary sampling and a meteorological station. The Dorset Environmental Science Centre have found that the drainage from Harp Lake flows into the Muskoka River and then straight into Lake Huron. There has been an increased thermal stability since 1970 that is caused by the high temperature extremities that occur during summer and fall rather than the length of time Harp Lake has no ice on the surface. During the summer and spring months Harp Lake is known to have significant chrysophyte algae levels that cause a decrease in the amount of light that can penetrate the water which then causes temperature levels to drop in the metalimnion.

The forested watershed is composed of mixed deciduous-conifer forest and the soil is composed of weak developed Spodosols. The weak developed Spodosols are formed from glacial till deposits and the groundwater is located within these glacial till deposits. Within the watershed dissolved organic carbon (DOC) data has been collected since the 1970's. The total DOC within Harp Lake can be estimated from the annual rate of new organic carbon to liter and soil layers, steady state of carbon, and the fragment of decomposition that produces DOC. In the litter layers of Harp Lake the production rate of DOC is between 5 and 750 g C m^{−2} yr^{−1}. The DOC found in the Harp Lake watershed has three outcomes of remineralization, sorption on mineral surfaces and transport out of the watershed through streams.

Research that was completed in 1996 found that Harp Lake has a high gross settling of steady-state total phosphorus. The high levels may have been caused by thick glacial tills in the Harp catchment. Also, there have been high septic total phosphorus level that have reach the littoral zone in Harp Lake. It is predicted that septic total phosphorus export will increase if the sorption sites between the lakeshore and the septic fields are not saturated because the available site will become scarce.

== Ecosystems ==
=== Invasive species ===
In 1993 Harp Lake was found to have an invasion of Bythotrephes, a type of cladoceran crustacean. There was a high abundance of Bythotrephes in the months of July and August. The invasion of Bythotrephes was shown to decrease zooplankton species richness by 17%. Medium-size cladocerans specifically had a large decline with the presence of Bythotrephes. In contrast to the decrease in zooplankton species richness Bythotrephes have been known to increase the densities of rotifer populations specifically the Conochilus unicornis.

=== Native species ===
Harp Lake contains the species Coregonus artedi (cisco) which is a cold-water planktivorous fish. Planktivorous fish ability to hunt is impacted by light availability and the frequency of encounter. Coregonus artedi are normally located in the hypolimnion during the day because they are so dependent on light availability. Coregonus artedi is important when it comes to the regulation of the invasive species Bythotrephes because C. artedi highly prey on them. This relationship has a direct effect on the zooplankton species richness because as Bythotrephes decrease the zooplankton species richness will increase. However, there is evidence that was found in 2003 to refute this argument. Researchers found that in the spring the peak daytime refuge thickness was negative and did not show any correlation to the relationship between C. artedi and Bythotrephes death rates. However in the summer months Coregonus artedi is responsible for 50% of the Bythotrephes mortality.

Perca flavescens (yellow perch) is a warm water planktivorous fish that is found in Harp Lake. Perca flavescens is found to be also responsible for 50% of the Bythotrephes mortality.
