= Chrysopora =

Scientific classification
- Domain: Eukaryota
- Clade: Sar
- Clade: Stramenopiles
- Phylum: Ochrophyta
- Class: Chrysophyceae
- Order: Hibberdiales
- Family: Chrysocapsaceae
- Genus: Chrysopora; Pascher 1925
- Species: C. fenestrata

Binomial name
- Chrysopora fenestrata Pascher 1925

Genus of golden algae

Chrysopora is a genus of golden algae containing one species, C. fenestrata. It was described by Adolf Pascher in 1925.
