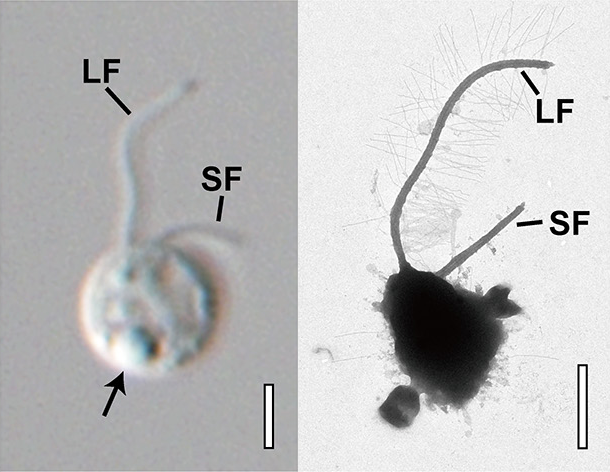
- Light and transmission electron micrographs of Spumella sinechrysos, showing long flagellum (LF), short flagellum (SF) and leucosin vesicle (arrow). Scale bars = 2 μm.

Scientific classification
- Domain: Eukaryota
- Clade: Sar
- Clade: Stramenopiles
- Phylum: Ochrophyta
- Class: Chrysophyceae
- Order: Ochromonadales; Pascher 1910
- Family: Ochromonadaceae; Lemmermann 1899

Type genus
- Ochromonas Vysotskii 1887

Synonyms
- Dendromonadaceae Stein 1878; Spumellaceae Kent 1880–1881; Uroglenaceae Lemmermann 1899; Syncryptaceae Poche 1913; Protoochromonadaceae Skvortzov 1961

= Ochromonadales =

Order of algae

Ochromonadales is an order of single-celled algae belonging to the class Chrysophyceae, also known as golden algae. Initially it contained numerous groups of flagellates that were not closely related. During the late 20th century, advancements in molecular and ultrastructural studies allowed the transfer of many of these groups out of Ochromonadales, and the order was reduced to a single family Ochromonadaceae. They are aquatic single-celled flagellated algae, with two heterokont flagella each, some of which have secondarily lost their chloroplasts and appear colorless.

== Description ==
Species of this order are flagellates, composed of cells capable of swimming by using two flagella. Though ancestrally photosynthetic, some species have secondarily lost this ability, and appear colourless. These are heterotrophic, and can be phagotrophic. Some are mixotrophic, capable of both photosynthesis and phagotrophy, such as Poterioomonas and Ochromonas. They can be found in marine and freshwater habitats.

== Systematics ==
=== Taxonomic history ===
Ochromonadales is an order of golden algae (class Chrysophyceae), a group of photosynthetic heterokonts (phylum Ochrophyta). It initially contained numerous families united only by being primarily monadoid (flagellate), palmelloid or amoeboid throughout their life cycle. For this reason, it included completely unrelated organisms such as the Bicosoecaceae (now outside the phylum Ochrophyta) or the Pedinellaceae (now in class Dictyochophyceae).

Its definition changed over time. In a 1957 classification of golden algae, French phycologist Pierre Bourrelly included in the order Ochromonadales all species that lack a cell wall and have a biflagellate stage during their life cycle, while those with a uniflagellate stage belonged to order Chromulinales. He included six families in the former: four flagellate families (Ochromonadaceae, Synuraceae, Coccolithophoraceae and Dinobryaceae) and two palmelloid families (Phaeocystaceae and Naegeliellaceae). Eventually, Coccolithophoraceae and Phaeocystaceae were moved to the division Haptophyta instead.

In 1968, Bourrelly again modified the composition of the order, placing within it all monadoid, coccoid or filamentous golden algae that generate cells with two flagella in at least one stage of their life cycle. He implemented three suborders:

1. Ochromonadinées, with free-living or sessile flagellates (Ochromonadaceae, Dinobryaceae and Synuraceae) and palmelloid forms (Ruttneraceae and Naegeliellaceae).
2. Phaeothamnioninées, with simple or branched filamentous forms (Phaeothamniaceae).
3. Chrysapioninées, with coccoid forms with a well-defined membrane (Chrysapionaceae).

In the following decades, most of these families were transferred to other orders and classes with the advent of ultrastructural studies and molecular phylogenetics. Synuraceae was moved to a new chrysophycean order Synurales established in 1987. Around the same time, Naegeliellaceae was merged with Chromulinaceae. Phaeothamniaceae and Chrysapionaceae were moved to a new class Phaeothamniophyceae established in 1998. Ruttnera, the type genus of Ruttneraceae, was merged with Chrysotila which belongs to Isochrysidaceae (Haptophyta).

Some authors merged Ochromonadales and Chromulinales, making the families Chrysococcaceae and Chromulinaceae new additions to the order. In addition, Paraphysomonadaceae, described in 1983, was also assigned to Ochromonadales. Jahn Throndsen proposed in 1993 classifying five families within Ochromonadales: Ochromonadaecae, Chrysococcaceae, Chromulinaceae, Dinobryaceae and Paraphysomonadaceae. The latter was eventually separated into its own order Paraphysomonadida. Other authors rejected the merge and maintained a separate Chromulinales, which took away Dinobryaceae, Chrysococcaceae and Chromulinaceae. In the end, only the family Ochromonadaceae remained.

This family, first described by German botanist Ernst Lemmermann in 1899, contains genera of free-floating, naked single-celled organisms with two flagella. Originally it only contained Ochromonas, its type genus. Its circumscription was later expanded by Bourrelly to include other genera. Some of these genera initially belonged to their own families, all of which became synonyms: Dendromonas, the type genus of Dendromonadaceae, described in 1878 by Friedrich Stein (as Dendromonadina); Spumella, the type of Spumellaceae, described in 1880 by William Saville-Kent (as Spumellidae); Uroglena, the type of Uroglenaceae, described in the same 1899 publication by Lemmermann; Syncrypta, the type of Syncryptaceae, described in 1913 by Franz Poche; and Protoochromonas, the type of Protoochromonadaceae, described in 1961 by Boris Skvortzov. Although Spumellaceae and Dendromonadaceae would have priority due to being described earlier, Ochromonadaceae was conserved because it had a wider usage.

=== Classification ===
The majority of known chrysophyte diversity falls within the orders Ochromonadales and Synurales. The following genera are included within Ochromonadaceae, the sole family of Ochromonadales:

- Acrispumella Boenigk & Grossmann 2015
- Anthophysa Bory 1822
- Atacamaspumella T. Piesch, F. Nitsche & H. Arndt 2022
- Chlorochromonas I.F. Lewis 1913
- Chlorospumella T. Piesch, F. Nitsche & H. Arndt 2022
- Cornospumella Boenigk & Grossmann 2016
- Melkoniania R.A. Andersen & H.-S. Yoon 2017
- Ochromonas Wysotzki 1887
- Poterioochromonas Scherffel 1901
- Poteriospumella T. Piesch, F. Nitsche & H. Arndt 2022
- Spumella Cienkowsky 1870 (=Monas O.F. Müller 1773, Heterochromonas Pascher 1912)
- Uroglena Ehrenberg 1834
- Uroglenopsis Lemmermann 1899
- Urostipulosphaera Pusztai & Škaloud 2019
