= Pompholyx (rotifer) =

Scientific classification
- Domain: Eukaryota
- Kingdom: Animalia
- Phylum: Rotifera
- Class: Monogononta
- Order: Flosculariaceae
- Family: Testudinellidae
- Genus: Pompholyx; Gosse, 1851

Genus of rotifers

Pompholyx is a genus of rotifers belonging to the family Testudinellidae.

The species of this genus are found in Europe and Australia.

Species:

- Pompholyx complanata Gosse, 1851
- Pompholyx sulcata Hudson, 1885
- Pompholyx triloba Pejler, 1957
