= Testudinella =

- Testudinella patina

Scientific classification
- Domain: Eukaryota
- Kingdom: Animalia
- Phylum: Rotifera
- Class: Monogononta
- Order: Flosculariaceae
- Family: Testudinellidae
- Genus: Testudinella; Bory de Saint-Vincent, 1822

Synonyms
- Pterodina Ehrenberg, 1938

Genus of rotifers

Testudinella is a genus of rotifers belonging to the family Testudinellidae.

The genus has a cosmopolitan distribution.

== Species ==
The following species are recognised in the genus Testudinella:

- Testudinella ahlstromi Hauer, 1956
- Testudinella amphora Hauer, 1938
- Testudinella andranomenensis Sudzuki, 1999
- Testudinella angulata Myers, 1934
- Testudinella aspis Carlin, 1939
- Testudinella berzinsi Gillard, 1952
- Testudinella bicorniculata De Smet, 2009
- Testudinella brevicaudata Yamamoto, 1951
- Testudinella brycei Hauer, 1938
- Testudinella caeca (Parsons, 1892)
- Testudinella carlini Bartoš, 1951
- Testudinella clypeata (Müller, 1786)
- Testudinella clypleata (Müller, 1786)
- Testudinella dendradena de Beauchamp, 1955
- Testudinella discoidea Ahlstrom, 1938
- Testudinella elliptica (Ehrenberg, 1834)
- Testudinella elongata De Smet, 2009
- Testudinella emarginula (Stenroos, 1898)
- Testudinella epicopta Myers, 1934
- Testudinella gillardi De Ridder, 1966
- Testudinella greeni Koste, 1981
- Testudinella haterumensis Sudzuki, 1992
- Testudinella haueriensis Gillard, 1967
- Testudinella husseyi Shiel & Koste, 1985
- Testudinella incisa (Ternetz, 1892)
- Testudinella kostei De Ridder, 1983
- Testudinella magna Gong, 1983
- Testudinella mucronata (Gosse, 1886)
- Testudinella munda Berzinš, 1982
- Testudinella neboisi Berzinš, 1982
- Testudinella obscura Althaus, 1957
- Testudinella ohlei Koste, 1972
- Testudinella ovata Myers, 1934
- Testudinella panonica Zivkovic, 1987
- Testudinella parva (Ternetz, 1892)
- Testudinella patina (Hermann, 1783)
- Testudinella pseudobscura
- Testudinella quadrilobata
- Testudinella reflexa (Gosse, 1887)
- Testudinella robertsonae Koste, 1990
- Testudinella sphagnicola Rudescu, 1960
- Testudinella stappersi Evens, 1947
- Testudinella striata (Murray, 1913)
- Testudinella subdiscoidea De Ridder, 1983
- Testudinella triangularis Myers, 1934
- Testudinella triangularis Sudzuki, 1992
- Testudinella tridentata Smirnov, 1931
- Testudinella truncata (Gosse, 1886)
- Testudinella unicornuta Koste & Shiel, 1987
- Testudinella vanoyei Gillard, 1947
- Testudinella walkeri Koste & Shiel, 1980
- Testudinella wuhanensis Sudzuki, 1999
- Testudinella zhujiangensis Wei, De Smet & Xu, 2010
- BOLD:ABA7022 (Testudinella sp.)
- BOLD:ABA7023 (Testudinella sp.)
- BOLD:ABA7024 (Testudinella sp.)
