= Sinantherina =

Scientific classification
- Kingdom: Animalia
- Phylum: Rotifera
- Class: Monogononta
- Order: Flosculariaceae
- Family: Flosculariidae
- Genus: Sinantherina; Bory de St.Vincent, 1826

Genus of rotifers

Sinantherina is a genus of rotifers belonging to the family Flosculariidae.

The genus has almost cosmopolitan distribution.

Species:

- Sinantherina ariprepes Edmondson, 1939
- Sinantherina procera (Thorpe, 1893)
- Sinantherina semibullata (Thorpe, 1889)
- Sinantherina socialis (Linnaeus, 1758)
- Sinantherina spinosa (Thorpe, 1893)
- Sinantherina triglandularis Arora, 1963
