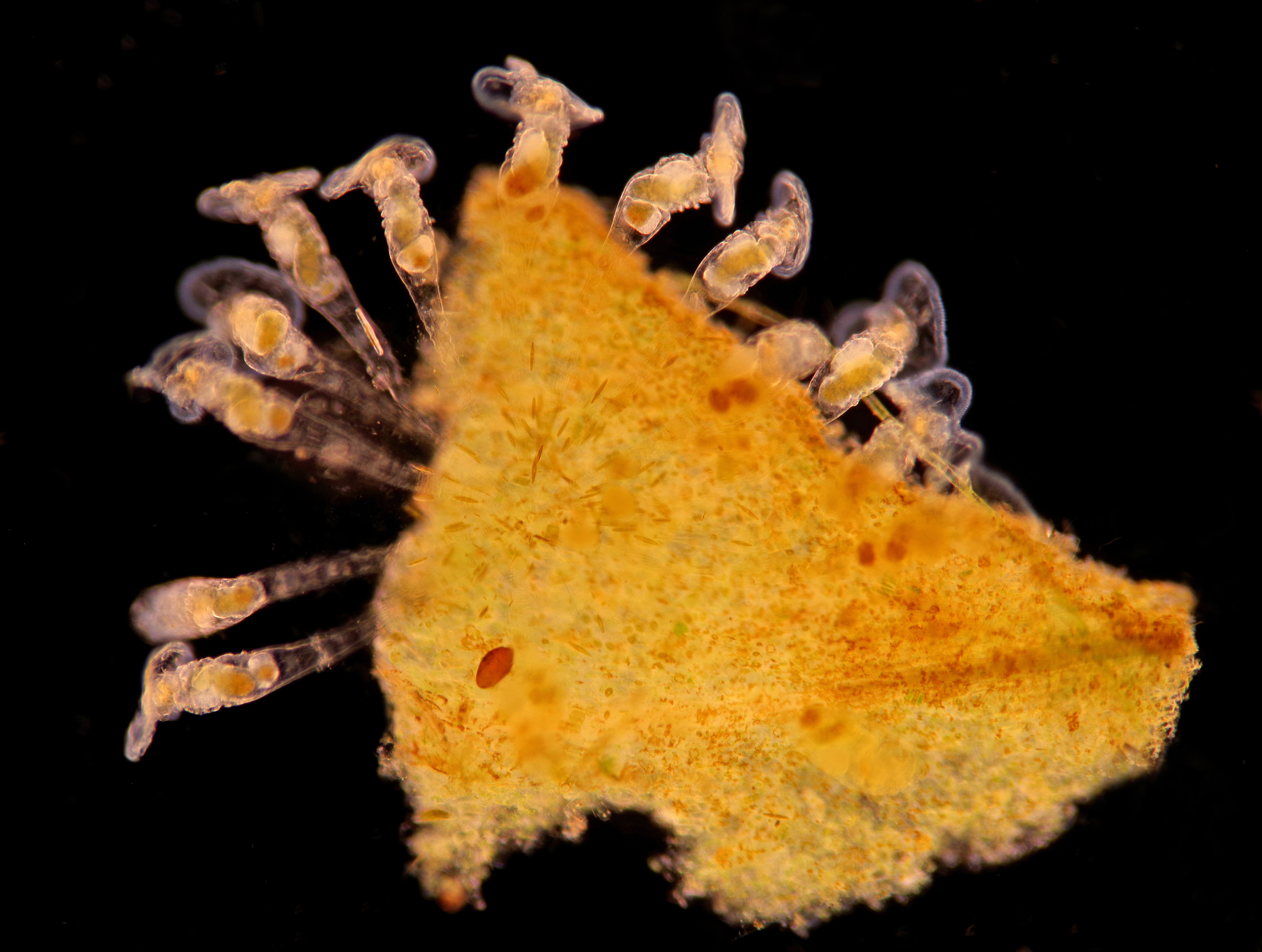

Scientific classification
- Domain: Eukaryota
- Kingdom: Animalia
- Phylum: Rotifera
- Class: Monogononta
- Order: Flosculariaceae
- Family: Flosculariidae
- Genus: Lacinularia; Schweigger, 1826

= Lacinularia =

Genus of rotifers

Lacinularia is a genus of rotifers belonging to the family Flosculariidae.

Species:

- Lacinularia elliptica Shephard, 1897
- Lacinularia elongata Shephard, 1896
- Lacinularia flosculosa (Müller, 1773)
- Lacinularia ismailoviensis (Poggenpol, 1872)
- Lacinularia ismaloviensis (Poppenpol)
- Lacinularia megalotrocha Thorpe, 1893
- Lacinularia pedunculata Hudson, 1889
- Lacinularia racemosa
- Lacinularia reticulata Anderson & Shephard, 1892
- Lacinularia striolata Shephard, 1899
