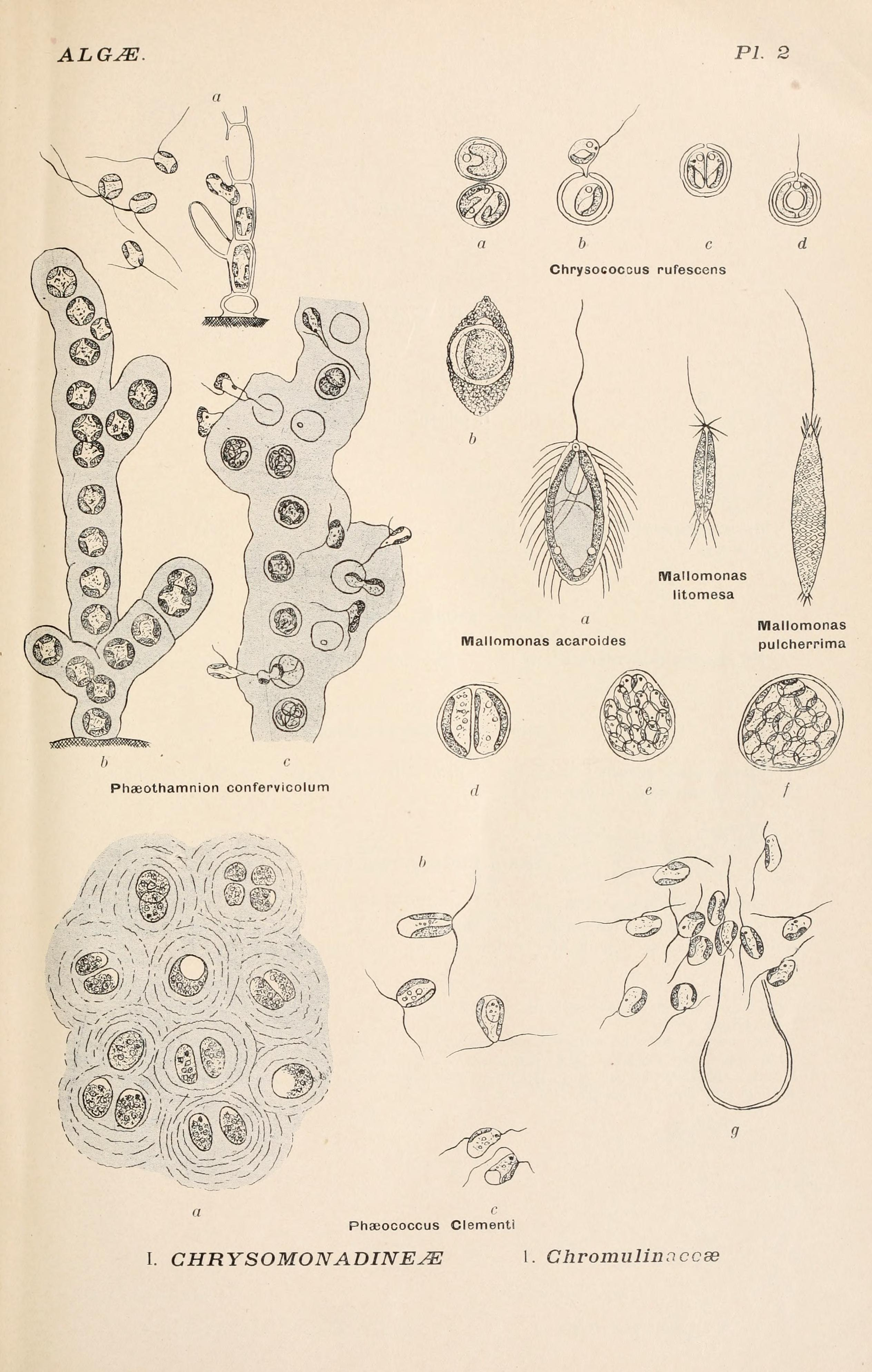
- Album général des Cryptogames, pl. 2 - Henri Coupin : a, b, c, d : Chrysococcus rufescens

Scientific classification
- Domain: Eukaryota
- Clade: Diaphoretickes
- Clade: SAR
- Clade: Stramenopiles
- Phylum: Gyrista
- Subphylum: Ochrophytina
- Class: Chrysophyceae
- Order: Chromulinales
- Family: Dinobryaceae
- Genus: Chrysococcus; Klebs, 1892

Species
- See text

= Chrysococcus =

Genus of algae

Chrysococcus is a genus of golden algae in the family Dinobryaceae.

== Species ==
- Chrysococcus biporus Skuja
- Chrysococcus bisetus Schiller
- Chrysococcus cordiformis var. astigma Bourrelly
- Chrysococcus cordiformis Naumann
- Chrysococcus cylindricus Lackey
- Chrysococcus cystophorus Skuja
- Chrysococcus cystophorus f. astigmatus Skuja
- Chrysococcus diaphanus var. astigma Bourrelly
- Chrysococcus diaphanus Skuja
- Chrysococcus dokidophorus Pascher
- Chrysococcus elegans (Doflein) Bourrelly
- Chrysococcus furcatus (Dolgoff) K.H.Nicholls
- Chrysococcus granulatus Hortobagyi
- Chrysococcus hargitae Kol
- Chrysococcus hemisphaericus Lackey
- Chrysococcus heverlensis Conrad
- Chrysococcus klebsianus Pascher
- Chrysococcus major Lackey
- Chrysococcus minutus (F.E.Fritsch) Nygaard
- Chrysococcus minutus var. astigma Bourrelly
- Chrysococcus ornatus Pascher
- Chrysococcus ovale Lackey
- Chrysococcus pascheri Lohmann
- Chrysococcus porifer Lemmermann
- Chrysococcus punctiformis Pascher
- Chrysococcus radians W.Conrad
- Chrysococcus rufescens f. tripora J.W.G.Lund
- Chrysococcus rufescens Klebs - type
- Chrysococcus rufescens var. compressa Skuja
- Chrysococcus skujae Heynig
- Chrysococcus spiralis Lackey
- Chrysococcus tessellatus F.E.Fritsch
- Chrysococcus triporus Mack
- Chrysococcus umbonatus Conrad
