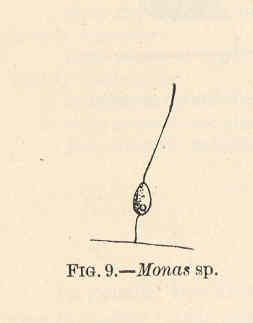

Scientific classification
- Domain: Eukaryota
- Clade: Sar
- Clade: Stramenopiles
- Division: Ochrophyta
- Class: Chrysophyceae
- Order: Chromulinales
- Family: Chromulinaceae
- Genus: Monas; O.F. Müller, 1773

= Monas (heterokont) =

Genus of algae

Monas is a genus of Chrysophyceae, described by Otto Friedrich Müller in 1773 as a group of Infusoria. Throughout time, it represented an aggregate genus.

== Taxonomic history ==
Many organisms were transferred to this genus, and most Monas spp. have later been synonymised with or integrated in other genera. The organisms once affiliated with Monas spp. truly belong to all major eukaryotic lineages (Opisthokonta, Amoebozoa, Rhizaria, Archaeplastida, Stramenopiles, Alveolata, Cryptophyta, Excavata), and even to prokaryotic lineages.

The genus was also included in other groups, as in Mastigophora or Flagellata. The current practice is the (questionable) synonymous use, based on morphological similarity, of the generic names Monas (mostly used in the east-Asian literature) and Spumella (synonymously used in the European and American literature) as unpigmented biflagellates in Chrysophyceae. However, there is a conflict between the morphological and molecular investigations. The present-day taxon Monas/Spumella is still polyphyletic, comprising at least three to five lineages, and evidence about the identity of the type species of Monas is missing.

This problem in the circumscription of groups, using the practical morphological (or taxonomic) species concept or the biological species concept (based on the degree of molecular similarity), is also faced in the taxonomy of other microorganisms, like other flagellates (e.g., Bodo, Cercomonas) and microalgae (e.g., Chlorococcales).
