= Apoikia lindahlii =

Scientific classification
- Domain: Eukaryota
- Clade: Sar
- Clade: Stramenopiles
- Division: Ochrophyta
- Class: Chrysophyceae
- Order: Apoikiida
- Family: Apoikiaceae
- Genus: Apoikia; Kim, Yubuki, Leander & Graham, 2010
- Species: A. lindahlii

Binomial name
- Apoikia lindahlii (Skuja 1956) Kim, Yubuki, Leander & Graham, 2010

Synonyms
- Monas lindahlii Skuja 1956

Species of single-celled algae

Apoikia lindahlii is a species of golden algae belonging to the monotypic genus Apoikia.

== Description ==
Apoikia lindahlii is a member of the chrysophytes, a class of flagellates informally known as golden algae. In particular, A. lindahlii is one of several chrysophyte species that are non-photosynthetic and colonial, whose cells are usually surrounded in mucilage. Each cell is spherical or ellipsoidal, with two flagella of unequal length. They form loose irregular colonies of a single layer of cells, from which swimming cells may detach. These colonies produce extensive colorless mucilage containing bacteria. The colonial cells lack a mucilage stalk and any type of intercellular connections, which are common in other genera. They also lack scales, which are present in other chrysophytes such as Synura.

Members of this species are obligate heterotrophs. Their chloroplasts have secondarily lost their photosynthetic activity, and instead they are colorless leukoplasts. These are positioned near the nucleus, surrounded by four membranes.

== Taxonomy ==
In 2010, protistologists Eunsoo Kim, Naoji Yubuki, Brian S. Leander and Linda E. Graham isolated this species of heterotrophic flagellate from acidic Sphagnum-dominated peat bogs located in Wisconsin, USA. In particular, samples were collected from Jyme Lake, Oneida County, and Hook Lake, Dane County. Molecular phylogenetic analysis placed the isolate inside the chrysophytes. In addition, two species of flagellates were discovered living inside the mucilage of this chrysophyte: Filos agilis and Nanum amicum.

Being a tiny, colorless chrysophyte, the authors considered a similarity with the polyphyletic genera Monas and Spumella. Its specific characteristics, such as the production of colorless mucilage and the formation of a single hemispherical layer of colonial cells, were previously reported in the species Monas lindahlii, described by Heinrich Leonhards Skuja in 1956. Kim and coauthors considered M. lindahlii to most closely resemble their new isolate. Due to the problematic status of the genus Monas, they established a new generic name Apoikia (meaning 'colony') to avoid taxonomic confusion, and described the isolate as its type and only species A. lindahlii.

Initially, Apoikia was not classified in any particular order or family of chrysophytes, but the 2010 molecular analysis placed it within "clade E", together with genera such as Lagynion and Chrysosphaera. In 2015, a phylogenetic study described a new order Apoikiida and family Apoikiaceae based on this genus, to accommodate it and the closely related genus Apoikiospumella.
