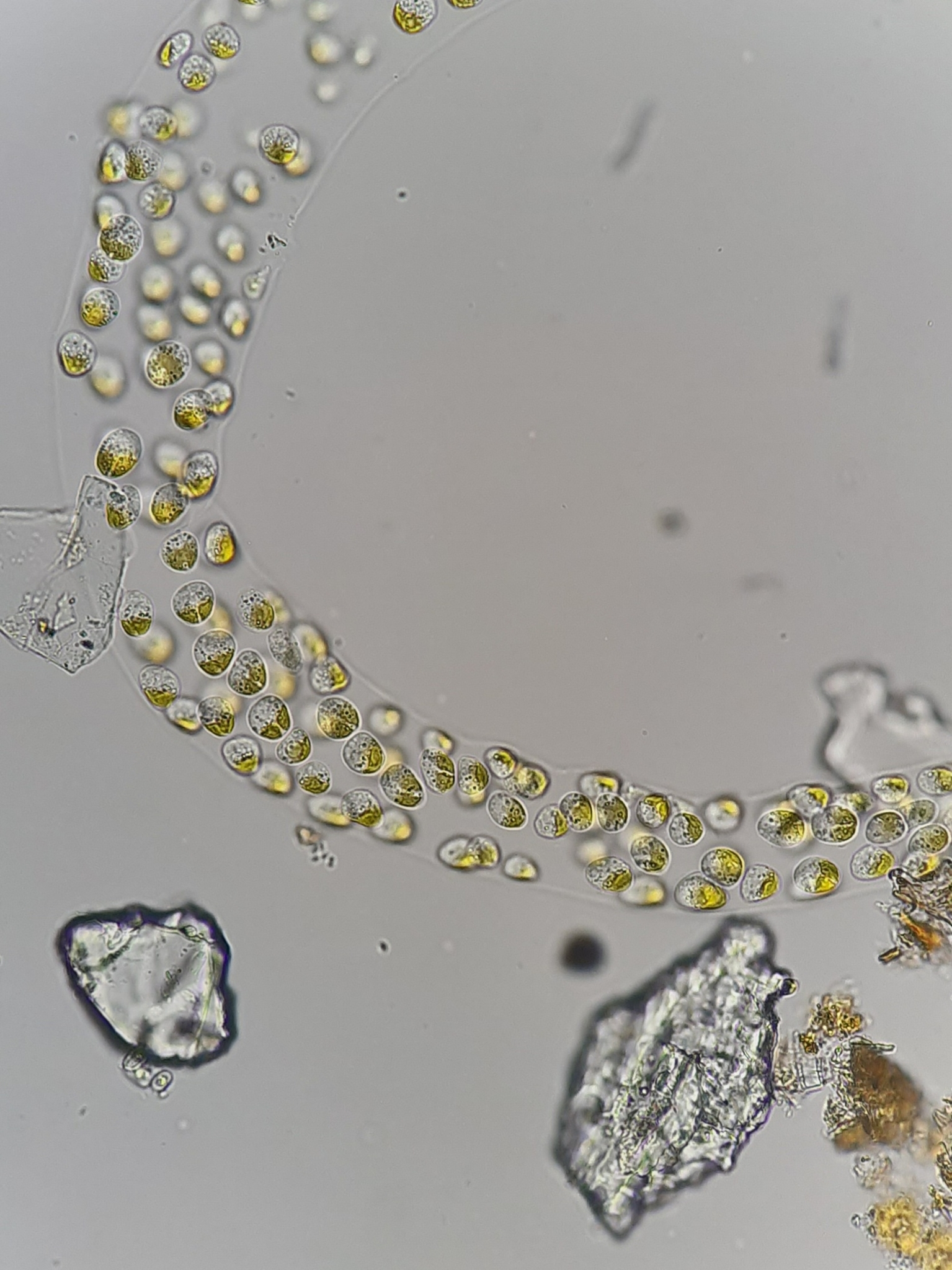
- Hydrurus foetidus

Scientific classification
- Domain: Eukaryota
- Clade: Diaphoretickes
- Clade: SAR
- Clade: Stramenopiles
- Phylum: Gyrista
- Subphylum: Ochrophytina
- Class: Chrysophyceae
- Order: Hydrurales
- Family: Hydruraceae
- Genus: Hydrurus; C.Agardh, 1824

= Hydrurus =

Genus of algae

Hydrurus is a genus of algae belonging to the family Hydruraceae.

The genus has almost cosmopolitan distribution.

Species:

- Hydrurus foelidus Dai
- Hydrurus foetidus (Villars) Trevisan
- Hydrurus penicillatus C.Agardh
