= Sn-glycerol-3-phosphate 1-galactosyltransferase =

Class of enzymes

sn-glycerol-3-phosphate 1-galactosyltransferase

Identifiers
- EC no.: 2.4.1.96
- CAS no.: 9076-70-4

Databases
- IntEnz: IntEnz view
- BRENDA: BRENDA entry
- ExPASy: NiceZyme view
- KEGG: KEGG entry
- MetaCyc: metabolic pathway
- PRIAM: profile
- PDB structures: RCSB PDB PDBe PDBsum
- Gene Ontology: AmiGO / QuickGO
Search
- PMC: articles
- PubMed: articles
- NCBI: proteins

sn-glycerol-3-phosphate 1-galactosyltransferase (EC 2.4.1.96) is an enzyme that catalyzes the chemical reaction

sn glycerol 3-phosphate
+ UDP-galactose
UDP
1-α-D-galactosyl-sn-glycerol 3-phosphate

The two substrates of this enzyme characterised from Ochromonas malhamensis are sn glycerol 3-phosphate and UDP-galactose. Its products are 1-α-D-galactosyl-sn-glycerol 3-phosphate and uridine diphosphate (UDP).

This enzyme belongs to the family of glycosyltransferases, specifically the hexosyltransferases. The systematic name of this enzyme class is UDP-galactose:sn-glycerol-3-phosphate 1-alpha-D-galactosyltransferase. Other names in common use include isofloridoside-phosphate synthase, UDP-Gal:sn-glycero-3-phosphoric acid 1-alpha-galactosyl-transferase, UDPgalactose:sn-glycerol-3-phosphate alpha-D-galactosyltransferase, uridine diphosphogalactose-glycerol phosphate galactosyltransferase, and glycerol 3-phosphate 1alpha-galactosyltransferase.
