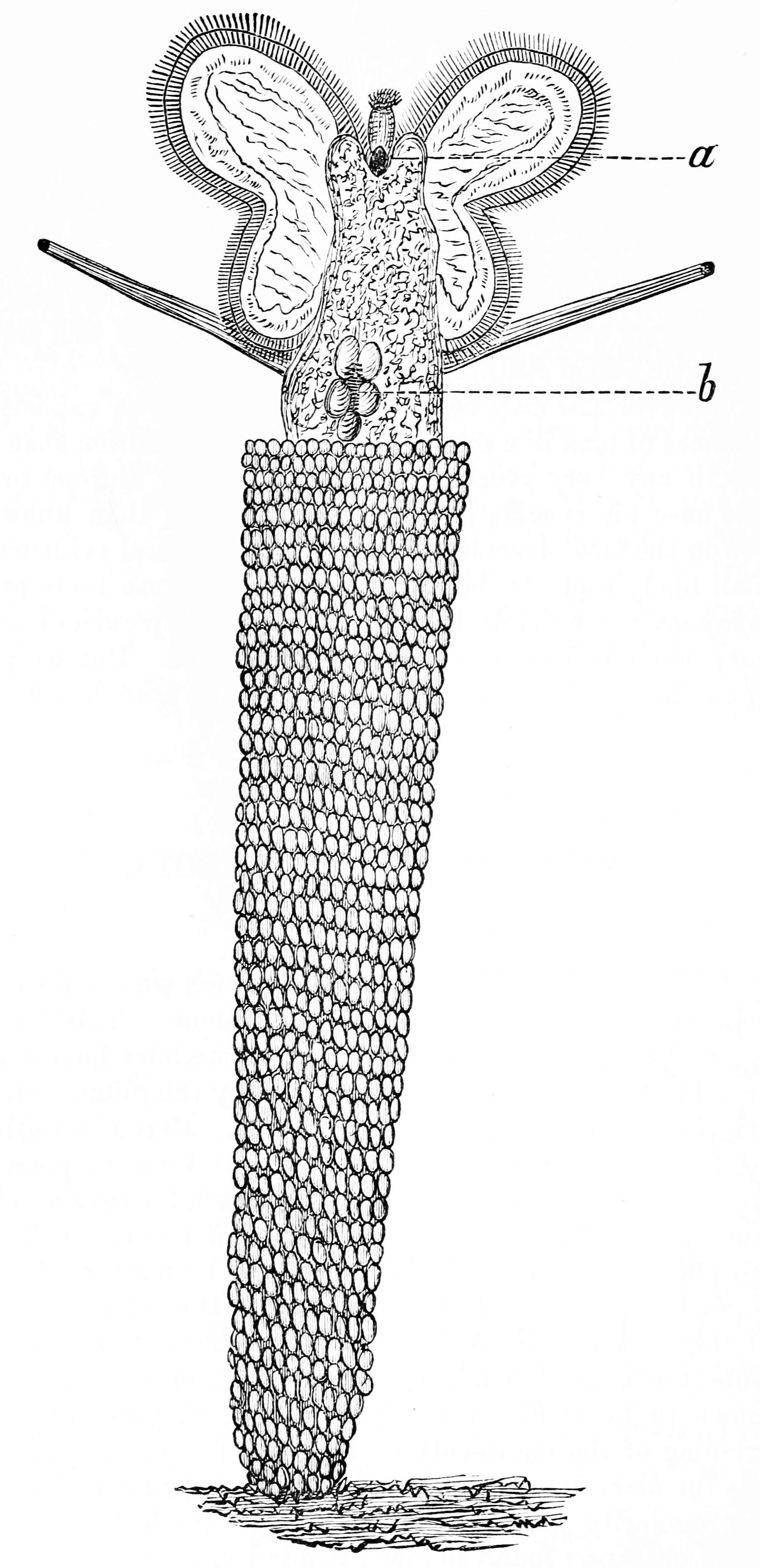
- Floscularia ringens

Scientific classification
- Kingdom: Animalia
- Phylum: Rotifera
- Class: Monogononta
- Order: Flosculariaceae
- Family: Flosculariidae
- Genus: Floscularia; Cuvier, 1798

Synonyms
- Melicerta (Schrank, 1803)

= Floscularia =

Genus of rotifers

Floscularia is a genus of rotifers belonging to the family Flosculariidae.

The species of this genus are found in Europe and Northern America.

Species:

- Floscularia armata Segers, 1997
- Floscularia bifida Segers, 1997
- Floscularia conifera (Hudson, 1886)
- Floscularia curvicornis Rougier & Pourriot, 2006
- Floscularia decora Edmondson, 1940
- Floscularia janus (Hudson, 1881)
- Floscularia longicauda
- Floscularia melicerta (Ehrenberg, 1832)
- Floscularia noodti Koste, 1972
- Floscularia pedunculata (Joliet, 1883)
- Floscularia rigens (Linnaeus, 1758)
- Floscularia ringens (Linnaeus, 1758)
- Floscularia wallacei Segers & Shiel, 2008
