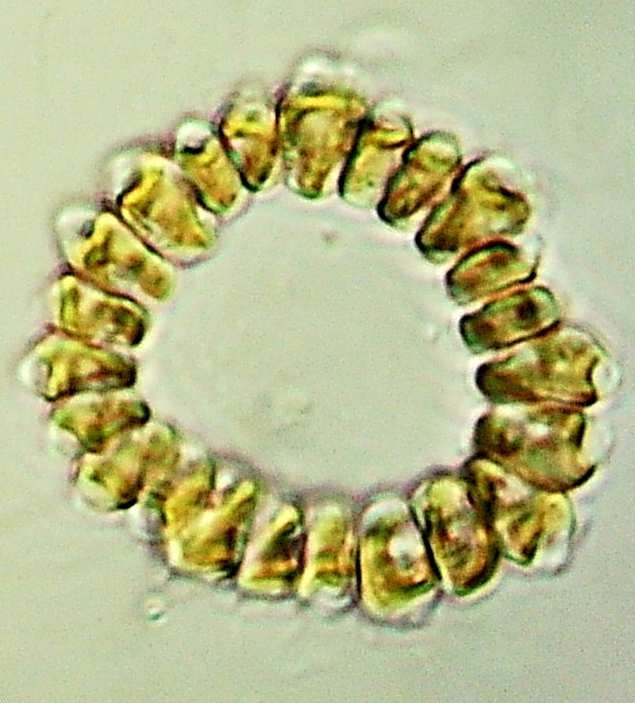
- Cyclonexis annularis

Scientific classification
- Domain: Eukaryota
- Clade: Diaphoretickes
- Clade: SAR
- Clade: Stramenopiles
- Phylum: Gyrista
- Subphylum: Ochrophytina
- Class: Chrysophyceae
- Order: Chromulinales
- Family: Chromulinaceae; Engler, 1897

Genera
- Chromulina; Cyclonexis; Didymochrysis; Eusphaerella; Lepidochrysis; Monas; Monochrysis; Ochromonas; Ochrostylon; Sphaleromantis; Spumella; Synuropsis; Uroglena; Uroglenopsis

= Chromulinaceae =

Family of algae

Chromulinaceae is a family of golden algae in the order Ochromonadales. It is composed of 34 genera (Preisig 1995).
