= Beauchampia =

Scientific classification
- Domain: Eukaryota
- Kingdom: Animalia
- Phylum: Rotifera
- Class: Monogononta
- Order: Flosculariaceae
- Family: Flosculariidae
- Genus: Beauchampia; Harring, 1913
- Species: B. crucigera

Binomial name
- Beauchampia crucigera (Dutrochet, 1812)

Genus of rotifers

Beauchampia is a monotypic genus of rotifers belonging to the family Flosculariidae. The only species is Beauchampia crucigera.

The species has been reported from Europe, North America and Africa.
