= Chrysophyta =

Group of algae

Chrysophyta or golden algae is a term used to refer to certain heterokonts.

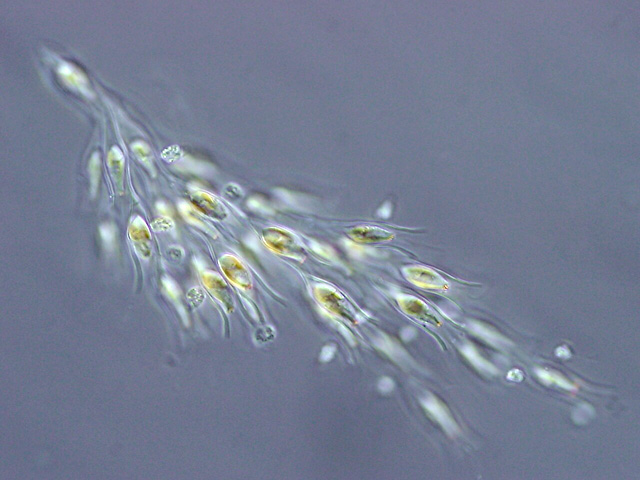
Dinobryon sp. from Shishitsuka Pond, Tsuchiura, Ibaraki Prefecture, Japan

It can be used to refer to:

- Chrysophyceae (golden algae), Bacillariophyceae (diatoms), and Xanthophyceae (yellow-green algae) together. E.g., Pascher (1914).
- Chrysophyceae (golden algae) E.g., Margulis et al. (1990).

Chrysophyta has some characteristics which includes their possession of the photosynthetic pigments which are chlorophylls a and c, they also possess a yellow carotenoid called fucoxanthin, this is responsible for their unique and characteristic color. They also store food as oil and not starch, their cells contain no cellulose and are often impregnated with silicon compounds. Each species has its own special markings.
