= Apoikia =

Apoikia (Greek, 'colony') may refer to:

- a colony of the Archaic Greeks
- Apoikia (genus), a genus of algae
