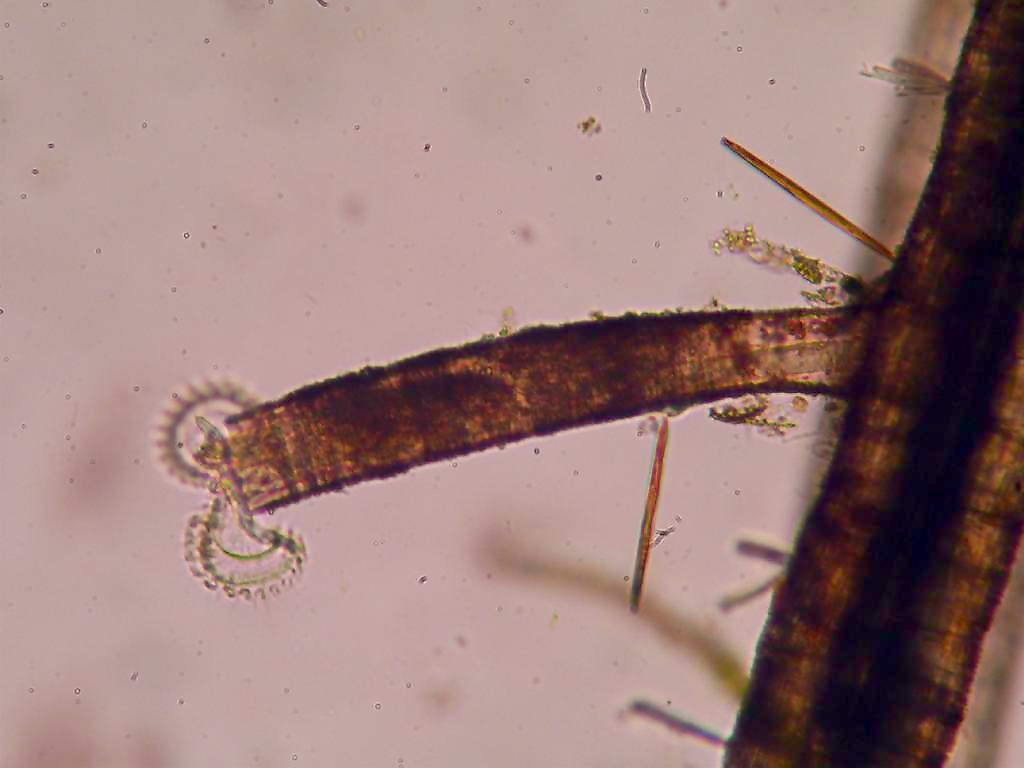
- Limnias watumiwamusi

Scientific classification
- Kingdom: Animalia
- Phylum: Rotifera
- Class: Monogononta
- Order: Flosculariaceae
- Family: Flosculariidae
- Genus: Limnias; Schrank, 1803

Synonyms
- Cephalosiphon Ehrenberg, 1853; Limnioides Tatem, 1868; Lymnias Oken, 1815

= Limnias =

Genus of rotifers

Limnias is a genus of rotifers belonging to the family Flosculariidae.

The genus has an almost cosmopolitan distribution.

== Species ==
The following species are recognised in the genus Limnias:

- Limnias berzinsi Kordbacheh, Wallace & Walsh, 2018
- Limnias ceratophylli Schrank, 1803
- Limnias cornuella Rousselet, 1889
- Limnias floridensis Kordbacheh, Wallace & Walsh, 2018
- Limnias harringi Kordbacheh, Wallace & Walsh, 2018
- Limnias lenis Meksuwan, Jaturapruek & Maiphae, 2018
- Limnias melicerta Weisse, 1848
- Limnias myersi Kordbacheh, Wallace & Walsh, 2018
- Limnias myriophylli (Tatem, 1868)
- Limnias novemceras Meksuwan, Jaturapruek & Maiphae, 2018
- Limnias nymphaea Stenroos, 1898
- Limnias schranki Kordbacheh, Wallace & Walsh, 2018
- Limnias shiawasseensis Kellicott, 1888
- Limnias taylori Kordbacheh, Wallace & Walsh, 2018
- Limnias weissei Kordbacheh, Wallace & Walsh, 2018
- Limnias wrighti Kordbacheh, Wallace & Walsh, 2018
- Limnioides ceratophylli Schrank, 1803
- Limnioides cornuella Rousselet, 1889
- Limnioides melicerta Weisse, 1848
- Limnioides nymphaea Stenroos, 1898
- Limnioides shiawasseensis Kellicott, 1888
- BOLD:ADW2598 (Limnias sp.)
