= Chromulina =

Scientific classification
- Domain: Eukaryota
- Clade: Diaphoretickes
- Clade: SAR
- Clade: Stramenopiles
- Phylum: Gyrista
- Subphylum: Ochrophytina
- Class: Chrysophyceae
- Order: Chromulinales
- Family: Chromulinaceae
- Genus: Chromulina; L.Cienkowsky 1870

Species
- Several, including: Chromulina aerophila J.W.G.Lund; Chromulina chionophila Stein; Chromulina crassa Bachmann; Chromulina cuneata Playfair; Chromulina dalecarlica Skuja; Chromulina diachloros Skuja; Chromulina elegans Doflein; Chromulina fenestrata Pascher; Chromulina ferrea J.W.G.Lund

Synonyms
- Chrysomonas F. Stein, 1878 Synonym; Acanthochrysis W. Conrad, 1931; Chromulinella Skvortzov, 1969; Chrysoglena Wislouch, 1914; Nannochrysis Pascher 1911; Pseudochromulina Doflein 1921; Spirochrysis W. Conrad, 1931

Genus of algae

Chromulina is a genus of golden algae in the family Chromulinaceae.
