= Hexarthra =

Scientific classification
- Domain: Eukaryota
- Kingdom: Animalia
- Phylum: Rotifera
- Class: Monogononta
- Order: Flosculariaceae
- Family: Hexarthridae; Bartos, 1959
- Genus: Hexarthra; Schmarda, 1854

Family of rotifers

Hexarthra is a genus of rotifers, the only genus in the family Hexarthridae.
