= Conochilidae =

- Conochilus sp.

Scientific classification
- Domain: Eukaryota
- Kingdom: Animalia
- Phylum: Rotifera
- Class: Monogononta
- Order: Flosculariaceae
- Family: Conochilidae; Harring, 1913

Genera
- Conochilopsis H.Segers & R.L.Wallace, 2001; Conochilus Ehrenberg, 1834

Family of rotifers

Conochilidae is a family of rotifers in the order Flosculariaceae, found in freshwater environments. It has two genera, Conochilus and Conochilopsis.
