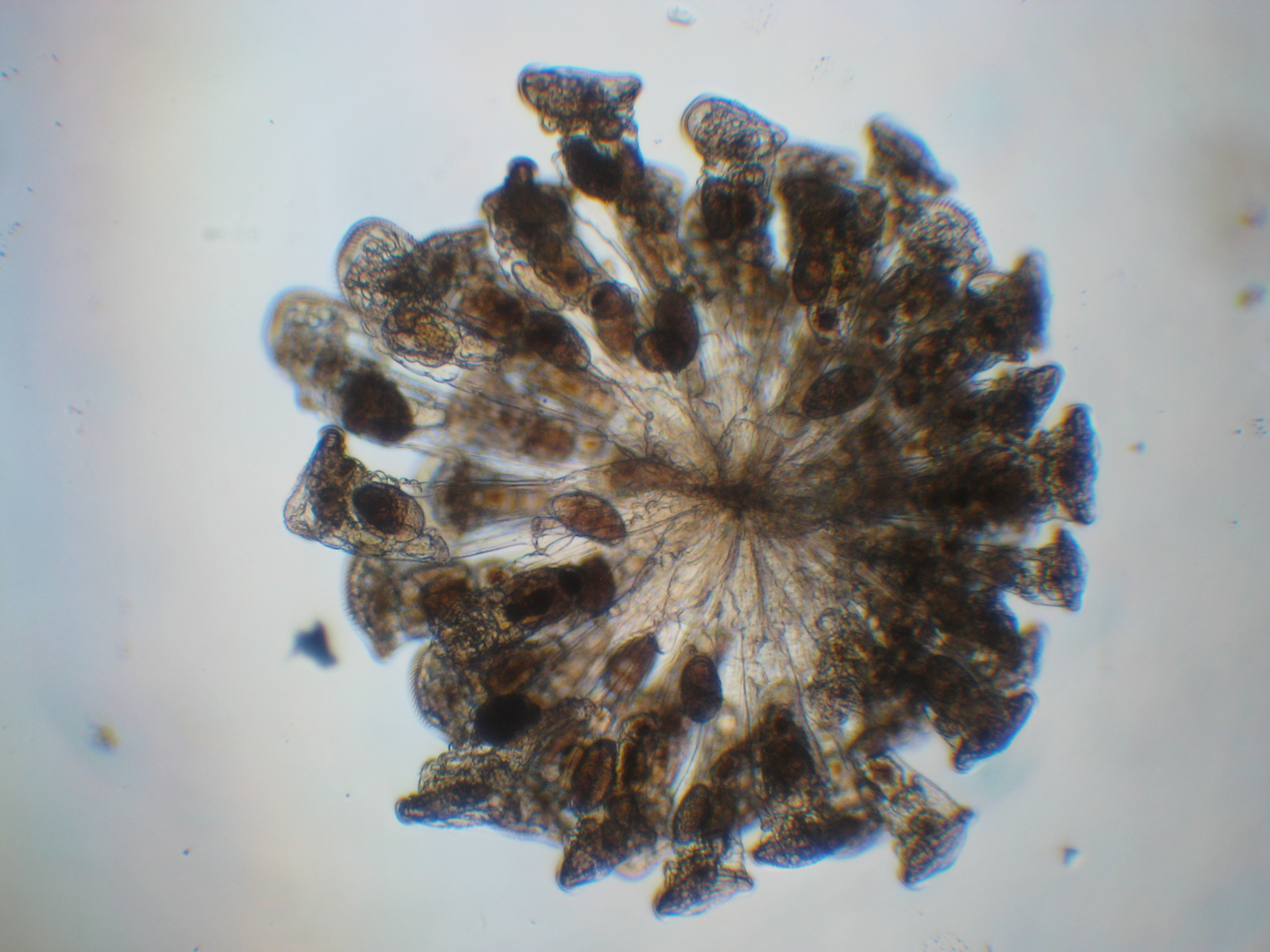

Scientific classification
- Domain: Eukaryota
- Kingdom: Animalia
- Phylum: Rotifera
- Class: Monogononta
- Order: Flosculariaceae
- Family: Conochilidae
- Genus: Conochilus; Ehrenberg, 1834

Synonyms
- Conochylus Forel, 1887

= Conochilus =

Genus of rotifers

Conochilus is a genus of rotifers belonging to the family Conochilidae.

The genus was first described by Ehrenberg in 1834.

The genus has almost cosmopolitan distribution.

Species:

- Conochilus unicornis Rousselet, 1892
