= Phaeothamniophyceae =

Scientific classification
- Domain: Eukaryota
- Clade: Sar
- Clade: Stramenopiles
- Division: Ochrophyta
- Clade: PX
- Class: Phaeothamniophyceae; Andersen & Bailey in Bailey et al. 1998

Orders
- Pleurochloridellales; Phaeothamniales

Synonyms
- Phaeothamniophycidae Andersen & Bailey 1998 stat. nov. Cavalier-Smith 2006

Class of ochrophytes

Phaeothamniophyceae is a class of ochrophytes. It contains two orders, Phaeothamniales and Pleurochloridellales, and consists of species separated from Chrysophyceae.

== Taxonomy ==
- Order Pleurochloridellales Ettl 1956
  - Family Pleurochloridellaceae Ettl 1956
    - Pleurochloridella Pascher 1939
- Order Phaeothamniales Bourrelly 1954 emend. Andersen & Bailey 1998
  - Family Phaeothamniaceae Hansgirg 1886 [=Stichogloeaceae Lemmermann 1899; Chrysapiaceae]
    - Apistonema Pascher 1925
    - Chrysapion Pascher & Vlk 1943
    - Chrysocapsopsis Thompson & Wujek 1998
    - Chrysoclonium Pascher 1925
    - Chrysodesmis Starmach 1970
    - Chrysodictyon Ramanathan 1947
    - Koinopodion Pascher 1943
    - Nematochrysis Pascher 1925
    - Phaeogloea Chodat 1922
    - Phaeoschizochlamys Lemmermann 1898
    - Phaeothamnion Lagerheim 1884
    - Podochrysis Magne 1975
    - Selenophaea Chodat 1922
    - Sphaeridiothrix Pascher & Vlk 1943
    - Stichogloea Chodat 1897
    - Tetrachrysis Dop 1980
    - Tetrapion Pascher 1943
