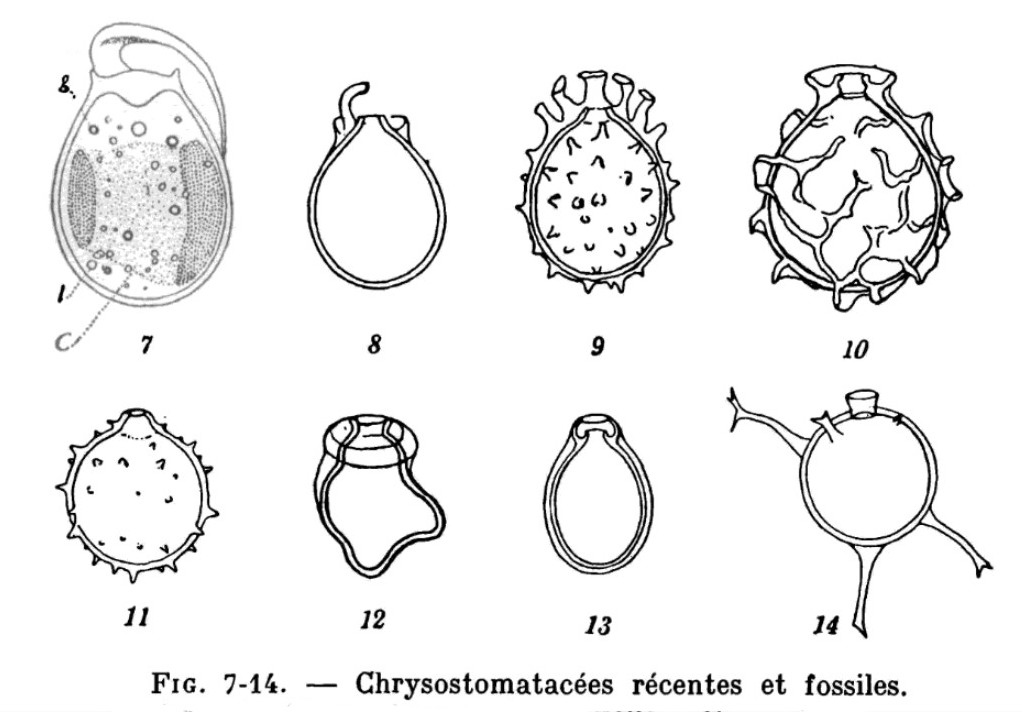
- Illustrations relating to various species in Chrysophyceae

Scientific classification
- Domain: Eukaryota
- Clade: Diaphoretickes
- Clade: SAR
- Clade: Stramenopiles
- Phylum: Gyrista
- Subphylum: Ochrophytina
- Class: Chrysophyceae
- Order: Chrysosphaerales

= Chrysosphaerales =

Order of algae

Chrysosphaerales is an order of Chrysophyceae.
