= Chlorosulfolipid =

Danicalipin A

Malhamensilipin A

Hexachlorosulfolipid

Several naturally occurring chlorosulfolipids

Chlorosulfolipids are a class of naturally occurring molecules that are characterized as being stereochemically complex. These polychlorinated structures have been isolated from the freshwater alga Ochromonas danica, and are proposed to serve a structural role within the membranes of this species. The high extent of chlorination in these natural products is suspected to be influenced by the concentration of chlorine ion in the surrounding environment. In addition to being integral components of algal membranes, chlorosulfolipids are also known to inhibit protein kinases. Furthermore, some of these complex molecules that have been isolated from toxic mussels are associated with diarrhetic shellfish poisoning. The lipid malhamensilipin A, isolated by the groups of Slate and Gerwick in 1994, displayed both antimicrobial activity as well as an inhibition of the pp60 protein tyrosine kinase.

== Biosynthesis of danicalipin A ==
3'-Phosphoadenosine-5'-phosphosulfate

Initially, docosanoic acid (behenic acid) (2) is constructed via the fatty acid synthesis pathway. Elovson demonstrated that the C-14 secondary hydroxyl group of molecule 3 was incorporated by oxidation of the fatty acid with molecular oxygen, as opposed to alkene hydration with water. The next step involves the enzyme-mediated transfer of the sulfate group from 3’-phosphoadenosine 5’-phosphosulfate (PAPS) to the diol to form molecule 4. Walsh has demonstrated that the halogenation of unactivated methyl groups can be catalyzed by a newly discovered class of α-ketoglutarate-dependent non-heme iron halogenases, suggesting a similar enzyme family could play a role in chlorosulfolipid chlorination. The stepwise chlorination occurs via an order-independent radical mechanism.

Biosynthetic scheme of danicalipin A
