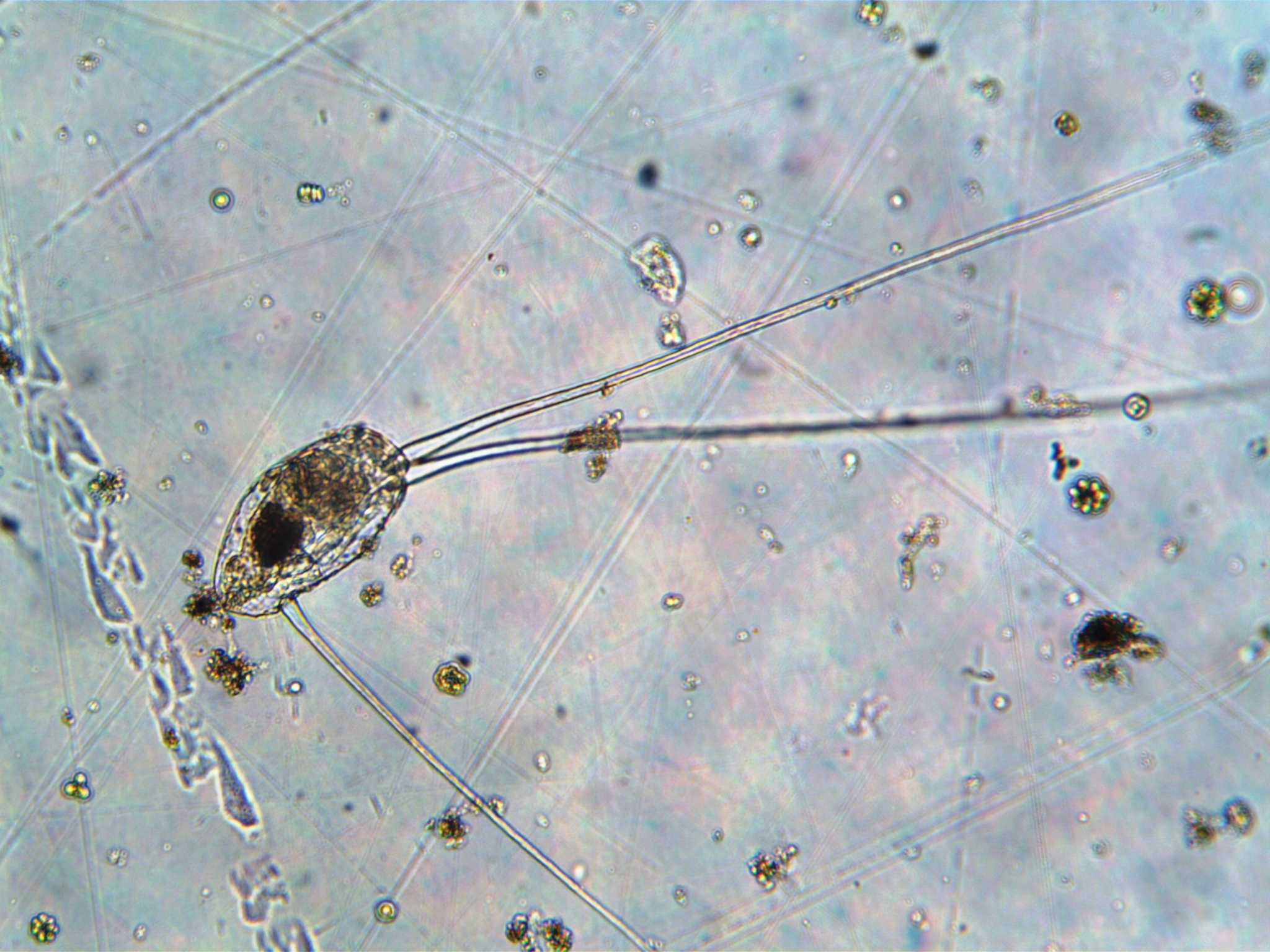
- Filinia longiseta

Scientific classification
- Domain: Eukaryota
- Kingdom: Animalia
- Phylum: Rotifera
- Class: Monogononta
- Order: Flosculariaceae
- Family: Trochosphaeridae

Synonyms
- Filiniidae

= Trochosphaeridae =

Family of rotifers

Trochosphaeridae is a family of rotifers belonging to the order Flosculariaceae.

Genera:

- Filinia Bory de St.Vincent, 1824
- Horaella Donner, 1949
- Trochosphaera Semper, 1872
