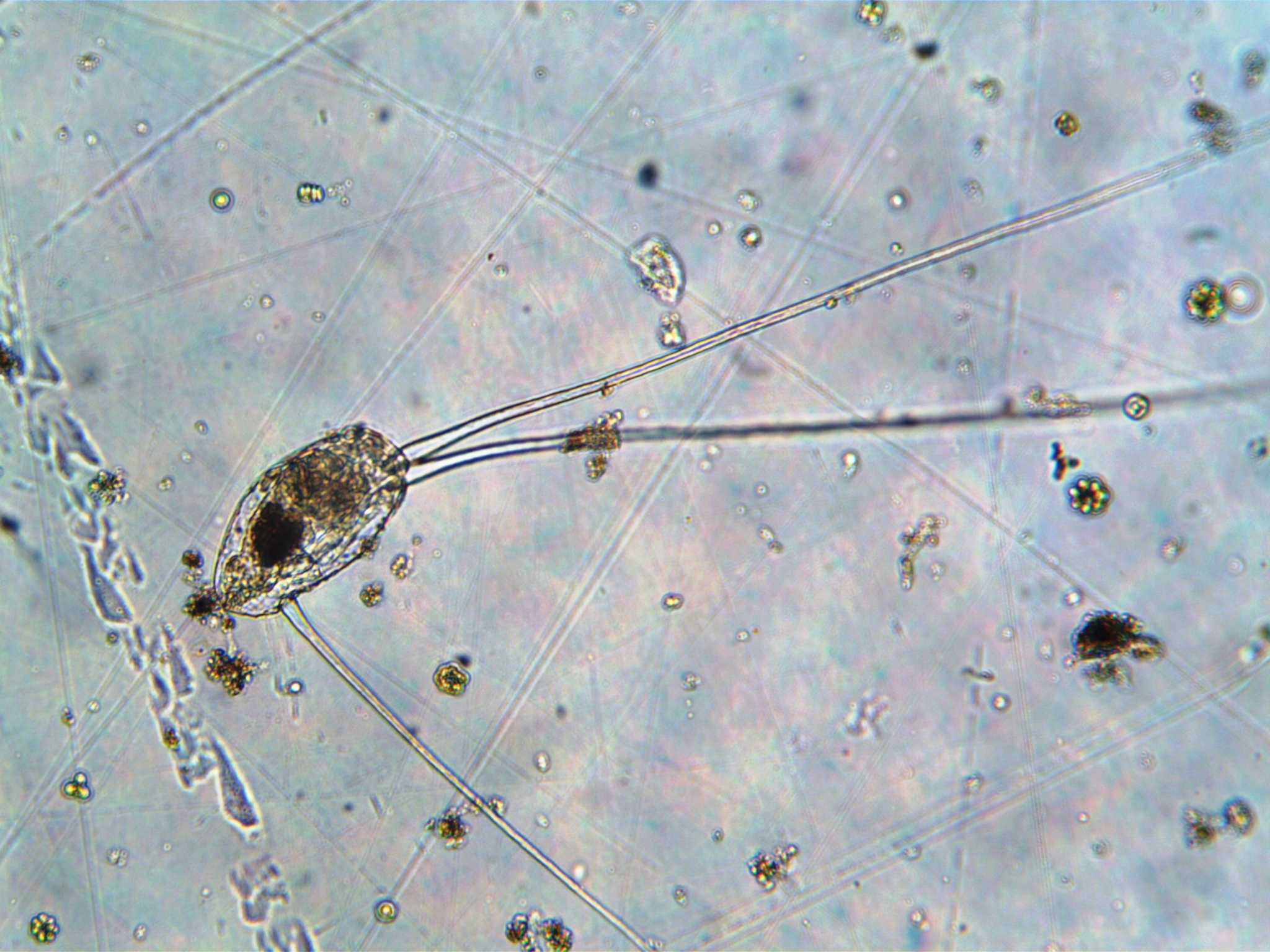
- Filinia longiseta

Scientific classification
- Kingdom: Animalia
- Phylum: Rotifera
- Class: Monogononta
- Order: Flosculariaceae
- Family: Trochosphaeridae
- Genus: Filinia; Bory De St. Vincent, 1824

Synonyms
- List: Fadeewella Smirnov, 1928; Filina Bory de St.Vincent, 1826; Parafilinia Sudzuki, 1989; Pedetes Gosse, 1886; Tetramastix Zacharias, 1898; Triarthra Ehrenberg, 1832

= Filinia =

Genus of rotifers

Filinia is a genus of rotifers in the family Trochosphaeridae.

The genus was first described by Jean Baptiste Bory de Saint-Vincent in 1824.

The genus has a cosmopolitan distribution and occurs in fresh and brackish waters.

== Species ==
The following species are recognised in the genus Filinia:

- Filinia australiensis Koste, 1980
- Filinia brachiata (Rousselet, 1901)
- Filinia camasecla Myers, 1938
- Filinia cornuta (Weisse, 1848)
- Filinia grandis Koste & Shiel, 1980
- Filinia hofmanni Koste, 1980
- Filinia limnetica (Zacharias, 1893)
- Filinia longiseta (Ehrenberg, 1834)
- Filinia minuta (Smirnov, 1928)
- Filinia novaezealandiae Shiel & Sanoamuang, 1993
- Filinia opoliensis (Zacharias, 1898)
- Filinia passa (Müller, 1786)
- Filinia pejleri Hutchinson, 1964
- Filinia saltator (Gosse, 1886)
- Filinia terminalis (Plate, 1886)
