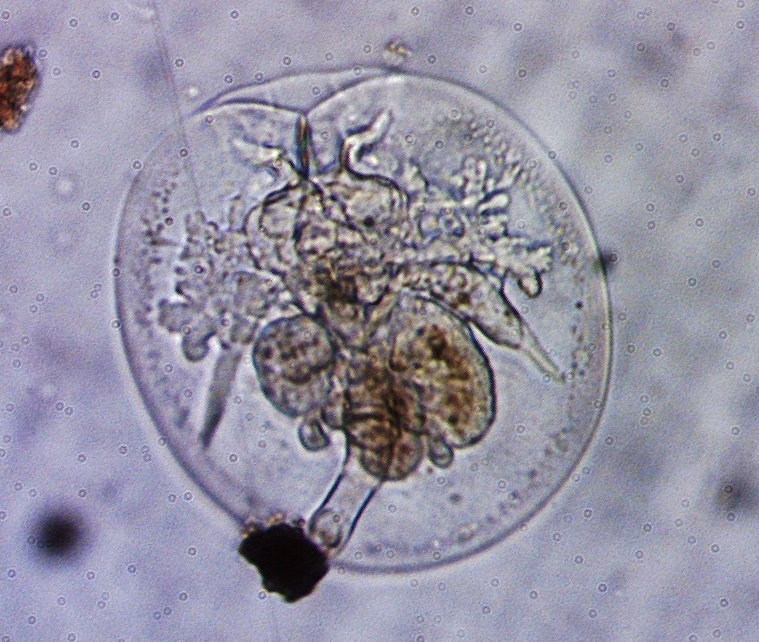
- Testudinella patina

Scientific classification
- Domain: Eukaryota
- Kingdom: Animalia
- Phylum: Rotifera
- Class: Monogononta
- Order: Flosculariaceae
- Family: Testudinellidae; Harring, 1913

= Testudinellidae =

Family of rotifers

Testudinellidae is a family of rotifers belonging to the order Flosculariaceae.

Genera:

- Anchitestudinella Berzins, 1973
- Pompholyx Gosse, 1851
- Testudinella Bory de St.Vincent, 1826
