= Pedetinus =

Scientific classification
- Domain: Eukaryota
- Kingdom: Animalia
- Phylum: Arthropoda
- Class: Insecta
- Order: Coleoptera
- Suborder: Polyphaga
- Infraorder: Cucujiformia
- Family: Curculionidae
- Genus: Pedetinus; Faust, 1895

Synonyms
- Pedetes Faust, 1894; Ursidius Champion, 1903

Genus of insects

Pedetinus is a genus of weevils belonging to the family Curculionidae.

The species of this genus are found in Central America.

Species:

- Pedetinus cinnamomeus Rheinheimer, 2018
- Pedetinus guyanensis Rheinheimer, 2018
