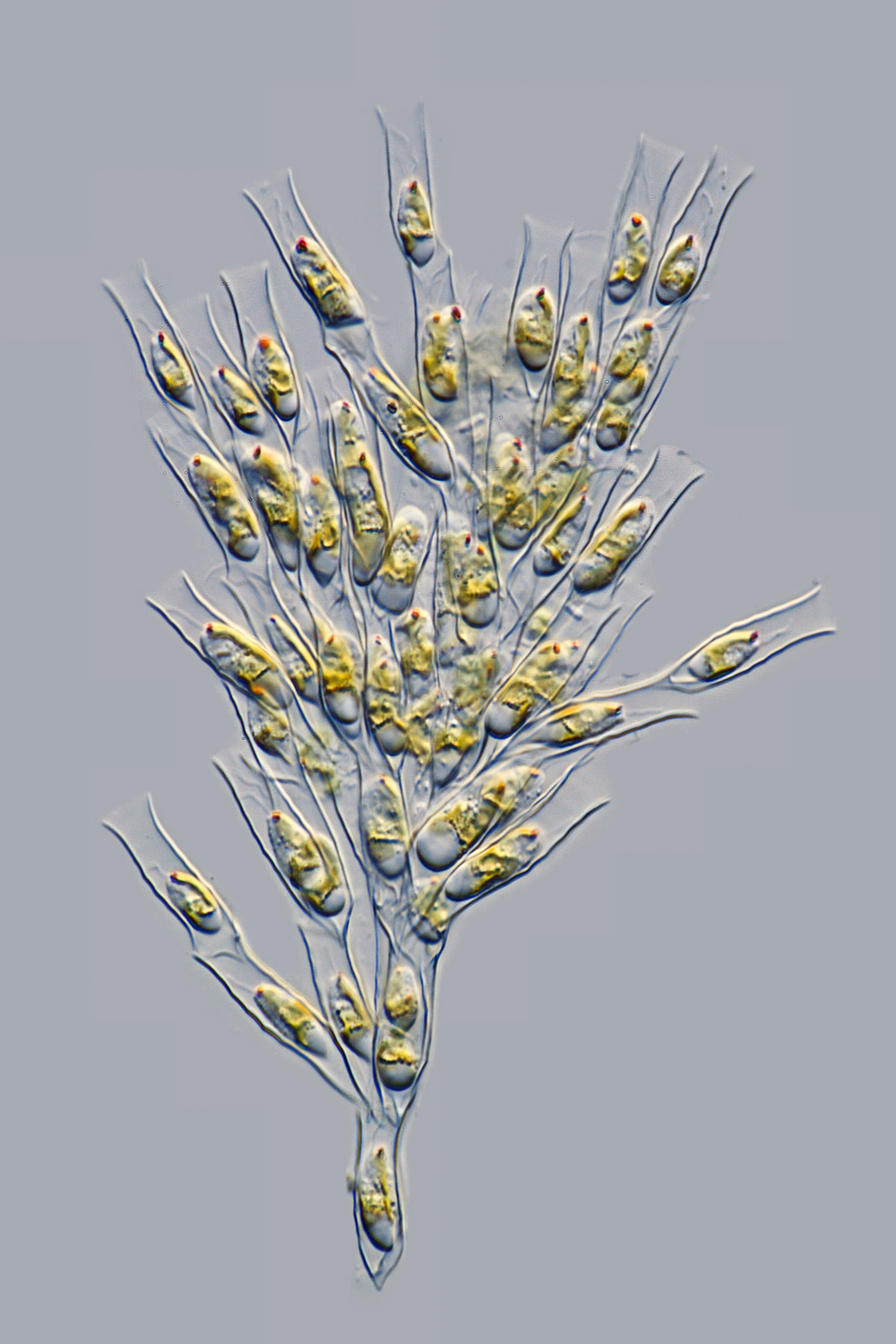
- Dinobryon divergens

Scientific classification
- Domain: Eukaryota
- Clade: Sar
- Clade: Stramenopiles
- Phylum: Ochrophyta
- Class: Chrysophyceae
- Order: Chromulinales
- Family: Dinobryaceae
- Genus: Dinobryon; Ehrenb.

= Dinobryon =

Genus of algae

Dinobryon is a type of microscopic algae. It is one of the 22 genera in the family Dinobryaceae. Dinobryon are mixotrophs, capable of obtaining energy and carbon through photosynthesis and phagotrophy of bacteria. The genus comprises at least 37 described species. The best-known species are D. cylindricum and D. divergens, which come to the attention of humans annually due to transient blooms in the photic zone of temperate lakes and ponds. Such blooms may produce volatile organic compounds (VOCs) that produce odors and affect water quality.

Dinobryon can exist as free-living, solitary cells or in branching colonies.

== Ecology ==
Though most commonly found in freshwater lakes and ponds, Dinobryon have also been documented flourishing in lotic and estuarine habitats.

Large blooms of Dinobryon are documented most commonly in oligo- to meso- trophic temperate lakes and ponds, though they have also been observed in eutrophic waters. Such blooms regularly occur during springtime at the onset of thermal stratification, and commonly occur following a diatom bloom. The blooms are initiated from resting siliceous spores called statospores that lay dormant on the lake bottom through the winter. Increased spring insolation causes them to germinate, producing amoeboid cells that generate two flagella and encase themselves in a vase-like cellulosic lorica. These motile cells rise into photic waters where they proliferate.
