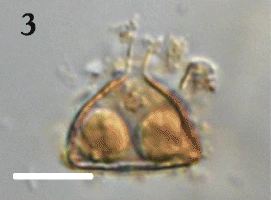
- Lagynion triangulare

Scientific classification
- Domain: Eukaryota
- Clade: Diaphoretickes
- Clade: SAR
- Clade: Stramenopiles
- Phylum: Gyrista
- Subphylum: Ochrophytina
- Class: Chrysophyceae
- Order: Hibberdiales; R.A.Andersen

Families
- Derepyxidaceae; Hibberdiaceae; Stylococcaceae

= Hibberdiales =

Order of algae

Hibberdiales is an order of Chrysophyceae (golden algae).

It includes Chromophyton, Hibberdia, and Lagynion.
