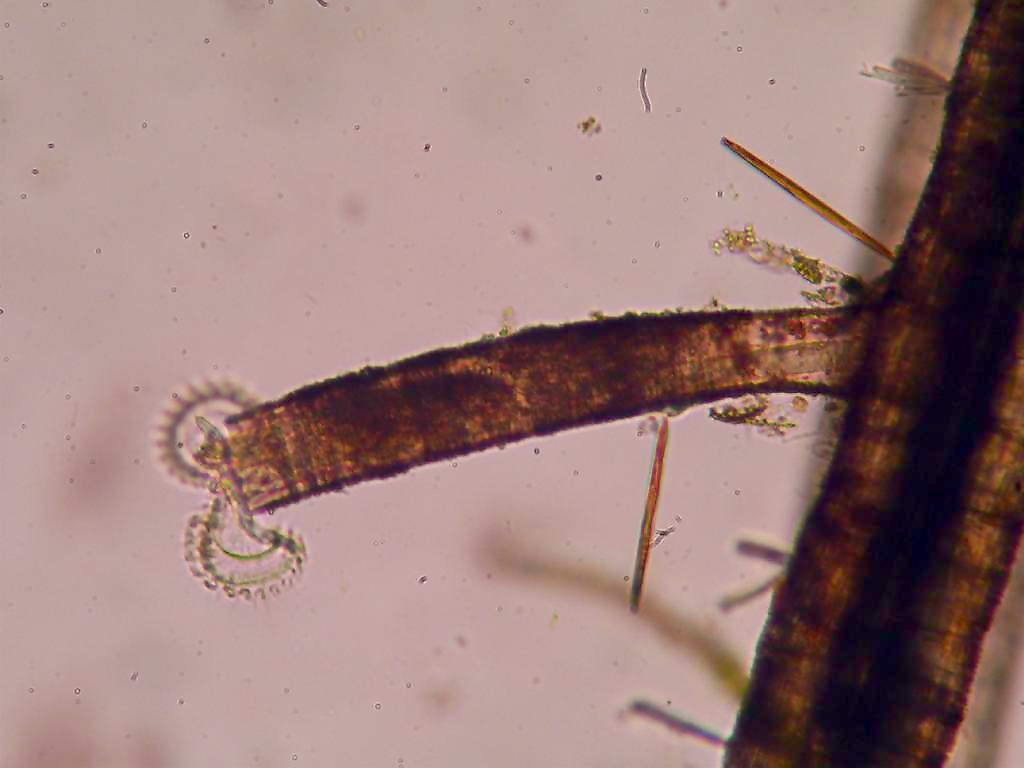
- Limnias watumiwamusi

Scientific classification
- Domain: Eukaryota
- Kingdom: Animalia
- Phylum: Rotifera
- Class: Monogononta
- Order: Flosculariaceae
- Family: Flosculariidae

= Flosculariidae =

Family of rotifers

Flosculariidae is a family of rotifers belonging to the order Flosculariaceae.

Genera:

- Beauchampia Harring, 1913
- Floscularia Cuvier, 1798
- Lacinularia Schweigger, 1826
- Lacinularoides Meksuwan, Pholpunthin & Segers, 2011
- Limnias Schrank, 1803
- Octotrocha Thorpe, 1893
- Pentatrocha Segers & Shiel, 2008
- Ptygura Ehrenberg, 1832
- Sinantherina Bory de St.Vincent, 1826
