= Phaeothamniales =

Scientific classification
- Domain: Eukaryota
- Clade: Diaphoretickes
- Clade: SAR
- Clade: Stramenopiles
- Phylum: Gyrista
- Subphylum: Ochrophytina
- Class: Aurophyceae
- Subclass: Phaeothamniophycidae
- Order: Phaeothamniales; Bourrelly

Families
- Phaeosaccionaceae; Phaeothamniaceae

Order of algae

Phaeothamniales is an order of alga in the Ochrophyta.
