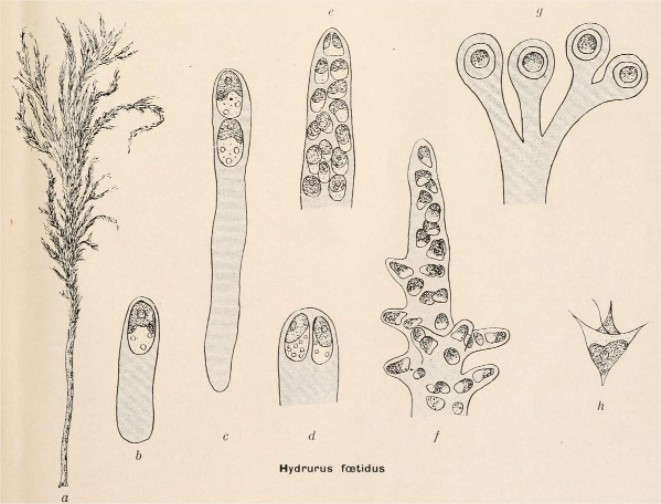
- Drawing of Hydrurus foetidus

Scientific classification
- Domain: Eukaryota
- Clade: Diaphoretickes
- Clade: SAR
- Clade: Stramenopiles
- Phylum: Gyrista
- Subphylum: Ochrophytina
- Class: Chrysophyceae
- Order: Hydrurales; Pascher, 1931

Families
- Hydruraceae

= Hydrurales =

Order of algae

Hydrurales is an order of golden algae.
