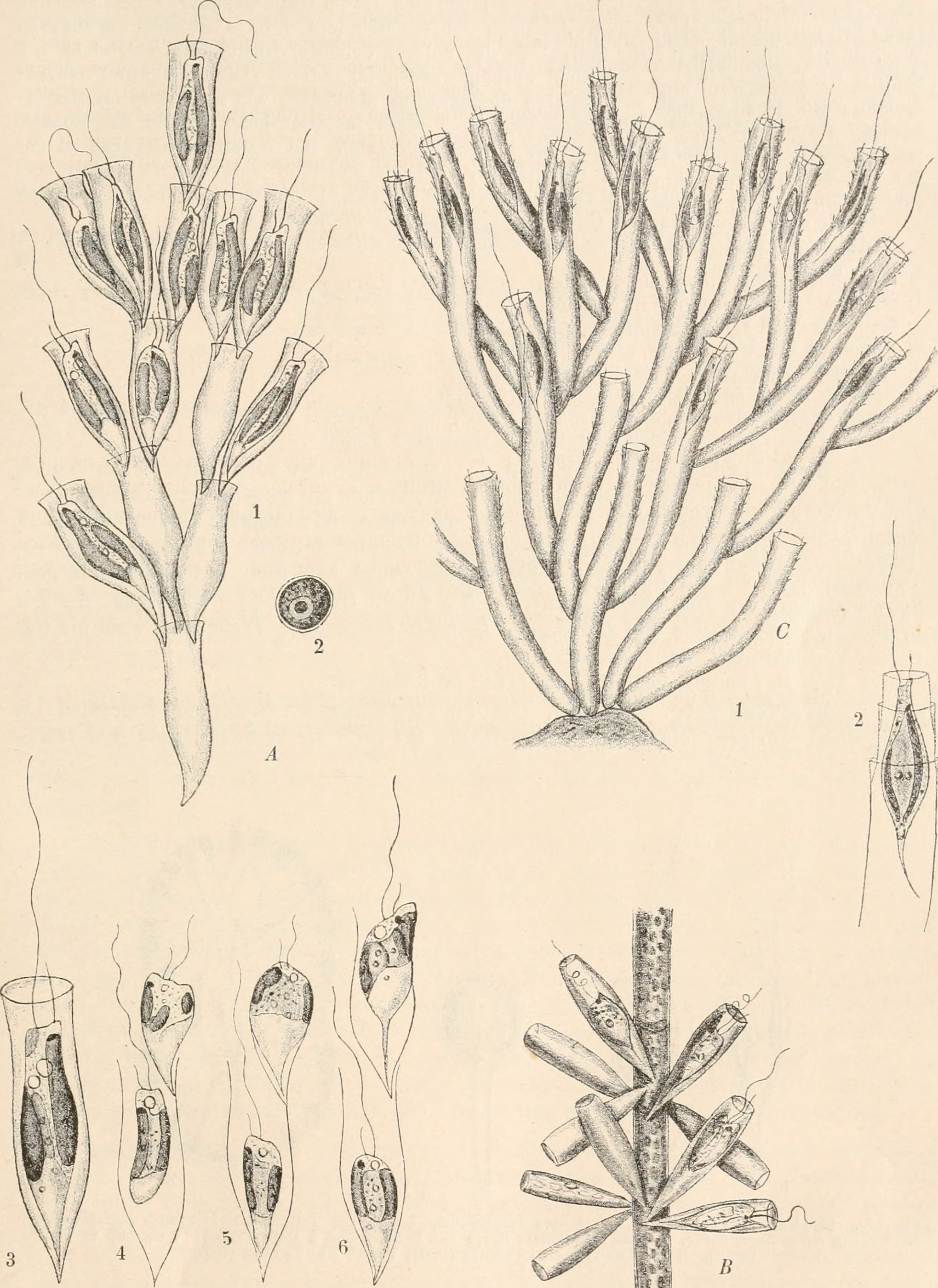

Scientific classification
- Domain: Eukaryota
- Clade: Diaphoretickes
- Clade: SAR
- Clade: Stramenopiles
- Phylum: Gyrista
- Subphylum: Ochrophytina
- Class: Chrysophyceae
- Order: Chromulinales
- Family: Dinobryaceae; Ehrenberg, 1834

= Dinobryaceae =

Family of algae

Dinobryaceae is a family of algae in the order Chromulinales comprising around 20 genera.

== Genera ==
The following genera included in the family Dinobryaceae:

- Arthrochrysis
- Arthropyxis
- Chrysoikos
- Chrysolykos
- Chrysococcus
- Codonobotrys
- Codonodendron
- Dinobryon
- Epipyxis
- Ollicola
- Poteriochroomonas
- Poteriospumella
- Pseudokephyrion
- Sphaerobryon
- Stenocodon
- Stokesiella
- Stylochrysalis
- Stylotheca
