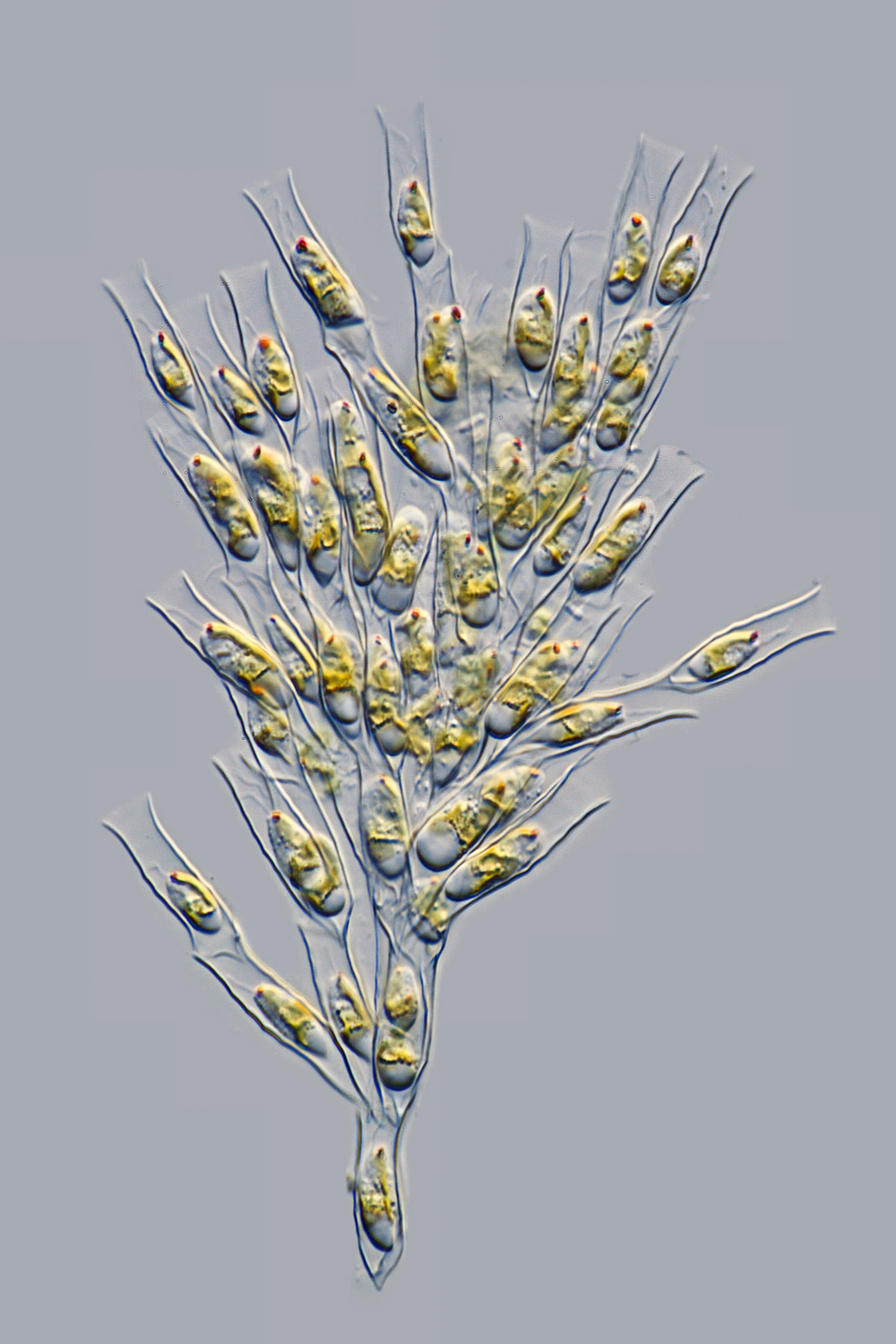
- Dinobryon divergens

Scientific classification
- Domain: Eukaryota
- Clade: Sar
- Clade: Stramenopiles
- Division: Ochrophyta
- Class: Chrysophyceae
- Order: Chromulinales; Pascher, 1910

= Chromulinales =

Order of algae

Chromulinales is an order of Chrysophyceae, golden-brown algae or golden algae. It was first identified and defined by Adolf Pascher (1881–1945) in 1910.

== Families ==
According to the GBIF:

- Chrysamoebaceae - (contains Chrysamoeba, Chrysidiastrum, Chrysostephanosphaera, Leukochrysis and Rhizochrysis)
- Chrysocapsaceae - (contains Chrysocapsa, Chrysocapsella, Chrysomorula, Dermatochrysis, Gloeochrysis, Naegeliella, Pascherella, Phaeaster and Tetrasporopsis)
- Chrysococcaceae - (contains Chrysococcocystis Doflein, 1923)
- Chrysolepidomonadaceae - (contains Chrysolepidomonas M.C.Peters & R.A.Andersen, 1993)
- Chrysosphaeraceae - (contains Chrysosphaera Pascher, 1914)
- Chrysothallaceae - (contains Phaeoplaca Chodat, 1926
- Dinobryaceae - (contains Calycomonas, Chrysococcus, Chrysolykos, Conradocystis, Dinobryon, Dinobryopsis, Epipyxis, Kephyrion, Kephyriopsis, Lepochromulina, Ochromonas, Ollicola, Phaeosphaera, Poterioochromonas, Pseudokephyrion, Sphaerobryon, Stenokalyx, Stokesiella, Stylobryon, Stylochrysalis and Stylopyxis)

Note; Previously included families Chromulinaceae and Paraphysomonadaceae have both been moved to Ochromonadales order.

== Incertae sedis ==
Unplaced genera include:

- Amphichrysis Korshikov, 1929
- Anthophysa Bory de Saint-Vincent, 1822
- Chrysobotriella E.Strand, 1928
- Chrysoxys Skuja, 1948
- Mucosphaera A.J.Dop & A.P.van Beem, 1980
- Oikomonas Kent, 1880
- Pedospumella Boenigk & Findenig, 2010
- Phaeobotrys
- Synuropsis J.Schiller, 1929
