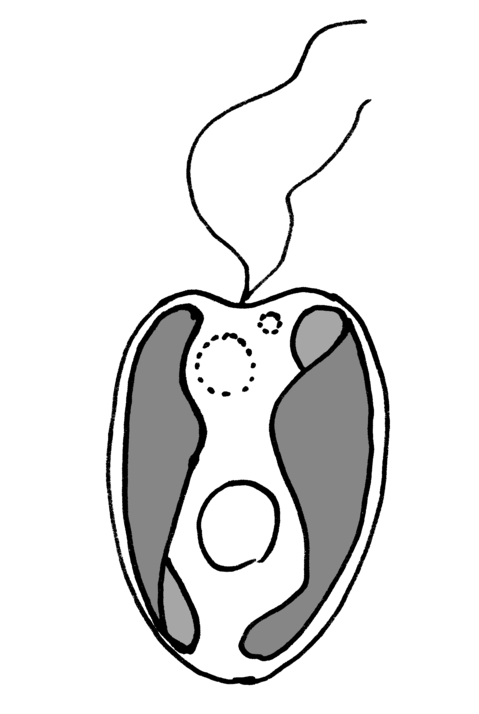

Scientific classification
- Domain: Eukaryota
- Clade: Sar
- Clade: Stramenopiles
- Division: Ochrophyta
- Class: Chrysophyceae
- Order: Ochromonadales
- Family: Ochromonadaceae
- Genus: Ochromonas; Vysotskii

= Ochromonas =

Genus of algae

Ochromonas is a genus of algae belonging to the family Ochromonadaceae.

The genus has cosmopolitan distribution.

Chlorosulfolipids, a class of biologically active compounds, were first discovered in some Ochromonas species.

== Species ==
Accepted species:

- Ochromonas bourrellyi Magne, 1954
- Ochromonas carolina
- Ochromonas cosmopoliticus Ruinen, 1938 (?)
- Ochromonas crenata Klebs, 1893 (?)
- Ochromonas danica E.G.Pringsh.
- Ochromonas elegans Doflein
- Ochromonas globosa Skuja
- Ochromonas granularis Doflein
- Ochromonas lubibunda Pascher
- Ochromonas malhamensis (?)
- Ochromonas minima Throndsen, 1969
- Ochromonas minuta (Lewis)
- Ochromonas marina Lackey, 1940 (?)
- Ochromonas mutabilis G.A.Klebs
- Ochromonas nana Doflein
- Ochromonas oblonga Carter, 1937
- Ochromonas ostreaeformis Swale & J.H.Belcher
- Ochromonas ovalis Doflein
- Ochromonas pyriformis Matv.
- Ochromonas sociata Pascher
- Ochromonas sparseverrucosa Skuja
- Ochromonas stellaris Doflein
- Ochromonas triangulata Vysotskii, 1899
- Ochromonas tuberculata D.J.Hibberd
- Ochromonas vallesiaca Chodat
- Ochromonas variabilis H.Meyer
- Ochromonas verrucosa Skuja
- Ochromonas viridis Böcher

(?) not accepted by GBIF in August 2022.
