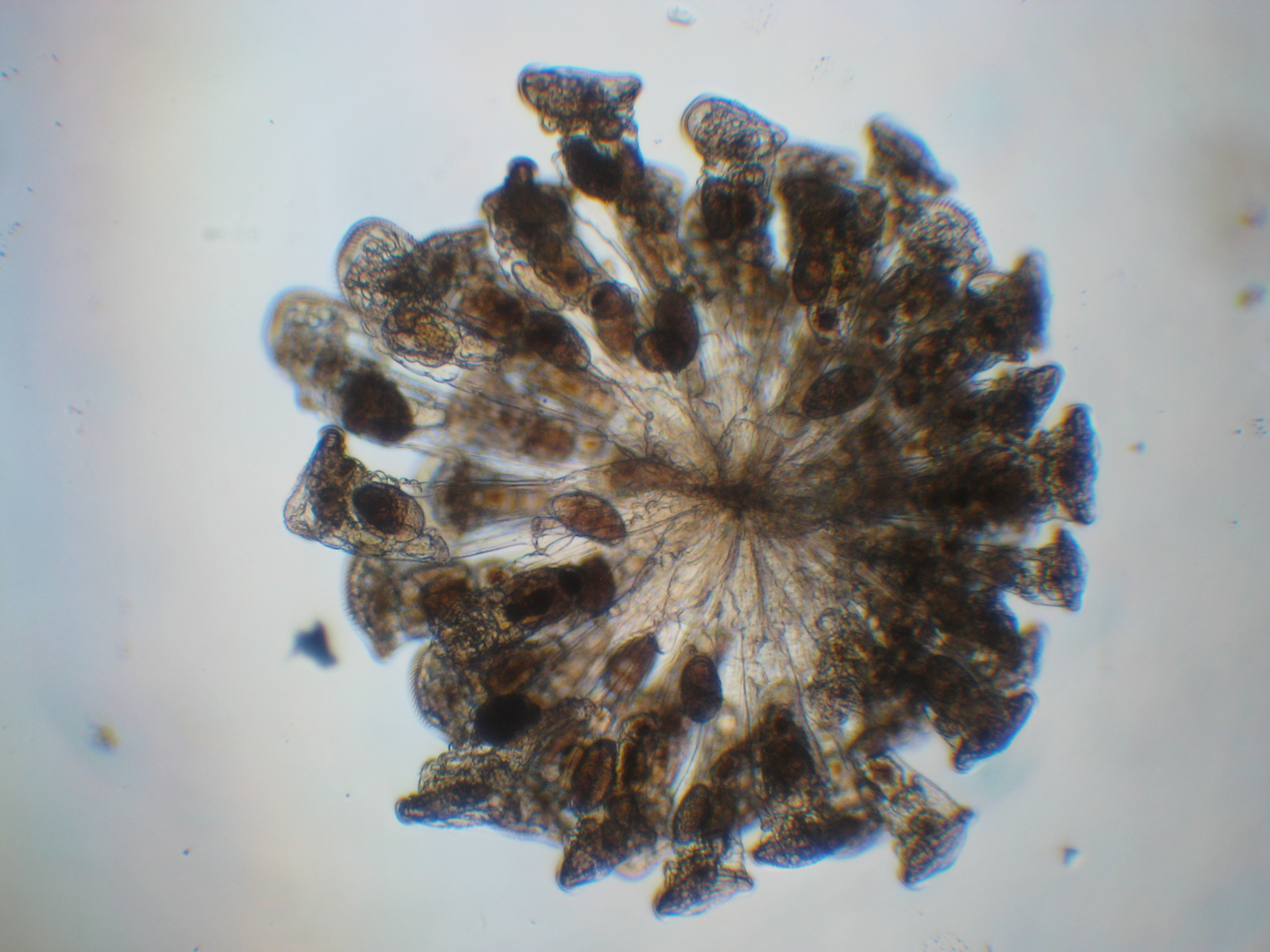
- Conochilus sp.

Scientific classification
- Kingdom: Animalia
- Phylum: Rotifera
- Class: Monogononta
- Order: Flosculariaceae; Harring, 1913

= Flosculariaceae =

Order of rotifers

Flosculariaceae is an order of rotifers, found in fresh and brackish water.

== Families ==
The order includes the six following families.

- Conochilidae
- Flosculariidae
- Hexarthridae
- Testudinellidae
- Trochosphaeridae
- Filiniidae
