= Commation eposianum =

Scientific classification
- Domain: Eukaryota
- Clade: Sar
- Clade: Stramenopiles
- Clade: incertae sedis
- Order: Commatiida
- Family: Commatiidae
- Genus: Commation
- Species: C. eposianum

Binomial name
- Commation eposianum Thomsen & Larsen, 1993

Species of nanoplankton

Commation eposianum is a species of heterotrophic protists discovered in 1993 in Antarctic waters. It is one of two species in the Commatiida, an order of stramenopiles closely related to actinophryids, a group of heliozoan protists, and to raphidophytes, a group of algae.

== Etymology ==
The name of the species, "eposianum" references the initiative behind the EPOS joint-European Antarctic research programme, which allowed this species to be discovered through an expedition to the Southern Ocean. The name of the genus derives from Latin comma, which references the general biconvex shape of the cell.

== Morphology ==
Commation eposianum is a species of unicellular eukaryotes composed of spherical biconvex cells measuring 7–12 μm. They present a narrow proboscis measuring 16–18 μm in length, relatively long in comparison to the proboscis of Commation cryoporinum. Their cytoskeleton consists of a spiralling band composed of a microtubular sheet associated with 3 crystalline, electron-dense structures. This band occupies one half of the cell and gets thinner from the periphery towards the center of the cell. Other structural microtubules arise from the surface of the cell nucleus. The cell has only one type of extrusome which is not visible under light microscopy, in contrast to Commation cryoporinum which presents two types of extrusomes that can be visible if large enough.
