= Biological life cycle =

Series of stages of an organism

Life cycle of a mosquito. An adult female mosquito lays eggs which develop through several stages to adulthood. Reproduction completes and perpetuates the cycle.

In biology, a life cycle (or biological life cycle when the context is not clear) is a series of stages of the life of an organism. It begins as a zygote, often in an egg, and concludes as an adult that reproduces, producing an offspring in the form of a new zygote. The same series of stages occurs in the new biological generation, the process repeating in a cyclic fashion. (Note: It is related though distinct from the concept of human generations, which are defined as a cohort of people who, on average, are born around the same period of time.) "The concept is closely related to those of the life history, development and ontogeny, but differs from them in stressing renewal." Transitions of form may involve growth, asexual reproduction, or sexual reproduction.

In some organisms, different "generations" of the species succeed each other during the life cycle. For plants and many algae, there are two multicellular stages, and the life cycle is referred to as alternation of generations. The term life history is often used, particularly for organisms such as the red algae which have three multicellular stages (or more), rather than two.

Life cycles that include sexual reproduction involve alternating haploid (n) and diploid (2n) stages, i.e., a change of ploidy is involved. To return from a diploid stage to a haploid stage, meiosis must occur. In regard to changes of ploidy, there are three types of cycles:

- haplontic life cycle — the haploid stage is multicellular and the diploid stage is a single cell, meiosis is "zygotic".
- diplontic life cycle — the diploid stage is multicellular and haploid gametes are formed, meiosis is "gametic".
- haplodiplontic life cycle (also referred to as diplohaplontic, diplobiontic, or dibiontic life cycle) — multicellular diploid and haploid stages occur, meiosis is "sporic".

The cycles differ in when mitosis (growth) occurs. Zygotic meiosis and gametic meiosis have one mitotic stage: mitosis occurs during the n phase in zygotic meiosis and during the 2n phase in gametic meiosis. Therefore, zygotic and gametic meiosis are collectively termed "haplobiontic" (single mitotic phase, not to be confused with haplontic). Sporic meiosis, on the other hand, has mitosis in two stages, both the diploid and haploid stages, termed "diplobiontic" (not to be confused with diplontic).

== Discovery ==
The study of reproduction and development in organisms was carried out by many botanists and zoologists.

Wilhelm Hofmeister demonstrated that alternation of generations is a feature that unites plants, and published this result in 1851 (see plant sexuality).

Some terms (haplobiont and diplobiont) used for the description of life cycles were proposed initially for algae by Nils Svedelius, and then became used for other organisms. Other terms (autogamy and gamontogamy) used in protist life cycles were introduced by Karl Gottlieb Grell. The description of the complex life cycles of various organisms contributed to the disproof of the ideas of spontaneous generation in the 1840s and 1850s.

== Haplontic life cycle ==
Zygotic meiosis

A zygotic meiosis is a meiosis of a zygote immediately after karyogamy, which is the fusion of two cell nuclei. This way, the organism ends its diploid phase and produces several haploid cells. These cells divide mitotically to form either larger, multicellular individuals, or more haploid cells. Two opposite types of gametes (e.g., male and female) from these individuals or cells fuse to become a zygote.

In the whole cycle, zygotes are the only diploid cell; mitosis occurs only in the haploid phase.

The individuals or cells as a result of mitosis are haplonts, hence this life cycle is also called haplontic life cycle. Haplonts include:

- In archaeplastidans: some green algae (e.g., Chlamydomonas, Zygnema, Chara)
- In stramenopiles: some golden algae
- In alveolates: many dinoflagellates, e.g., Ceratium, Gymnodinium, some apicomplexans (e.g., Plasmodium)
- In rhizarians: some euglyphids, ascetosporeans
- In excavates: some parabasalids
- In amoebozoans: Dictyostelium
- In opisthokonts: most fungi (some chytrids, zygomycetes, some ascomycetes, basidiomycetes)

== Diplontic life cycle ==
Gametic meiosis

In gametic meiosis, instead of immediately dividing meiotically to produce haploid cells, the zygote divides mitotically to produce a multicellular diploid individual or a group of more unicellular diploid cells. Cells from the diploid individuals then undergo meiosis to produce haploid cells or gametes. Haploid cells may divide again (by mitosis) to form more haploid cells, as in many yeasts, but the haploid phase is not the predominant life cycle phase. In most diplonts, mitosis occurs only in the diploid phase, i.e. gametes usually form quickly and fuse to produce diploid zygotes.

In the whole cycle, gametes are usually the only haploid cells, and mitosis usually occurs only in the diploid phase.

The diploid multicellular individual is a diplont, hence a gametic meiosis is also called a diplontic life cycle. Diplonts are:

- In archaeplastidans: some green algae (e.g., Cladophora glomerata, Acetabularia)
- In stramenopiles: some brown algae (the Fucales, however, their life cycle can also be interpreted as strongly heteromorphic-diplohaplontic, with a highly reduced gametophyte phase, as in the flowering plants), some xanthophytes (e.g., Vaucheria), most diatoms, some oomycetes (e.g., Saprolegnia, Plasmopara viticola), opalines, some "heliozoans" (e.g., Actinophrys, Actinosphaerium)
- In alveolates: ciliates
- In excavates: some parabasalids
- In opisthokonts: animals, some fungi (e.g., some ascomycetes)

== Haplodiplontic life cycle ==
Sporic meiosis

In sporic meiosis (also commonly known as intermediary meiosis), the zygote divides mitotically to produce a multicellular diploid sporophyte. The sporophyte creates spores via meiosis which also then divide mitotically producing haploid individuals called gametophytes. The gametophytes produce gametes via mitosis. In some plants the gametophyte is not only small-sized but also short-lived; in other plants and many algae, the gametophyte is the "dominant" stage of the life cycle.

Haplodiplonts are:

- In archaeplastidans: red algae (which have two sporophyte generations), some green algae (e.g., Ulva), land plants
- In stramenopiles: most brown algae
- In rhizarians: many foraminiferans, plasmodiophoromycetes
- In amoebozoa: myxogastrids
- In opisthokonts: some fungi (some chytrids, some ascomycetes like the brewer's yeast)
- Other eukaryotes: haptophytes

Some animals have a sex-determination system called haplodiploid, but this is not related to the haplodiplontic life cycle.

== Vegetative meiosis ==
Some red algae (such as Bonnemaisonia and Lemanea) and green algae (such as Prasiola) have vegetative meiosis, also called somatic meiosis, which is a rare phenomenon. Vegetative meiosis can occur in haplodiplontic and also in diplontic life cycles. The gametophytes remain attached to and part of the sporophyte. Vegetative (non-reproductive) diploid cells undergo meiosis, generating vegetative haploid cells. These undergo many mitosis, and produces gametes.

A different phenomenon, called vegetative diploidization, a type of apomixis, occurs in some brown algae (e.g., Elachista stellaris). Cells in a haploid part of the plant spontaneously duplicate their chromosomes to produce diploid tissue.

== Parasitic life cycle ==
Parasites depend on the exploitation of one or more hosts. Those that must infect more than one host species to complete their life cycles are said to have complex or indirect life cycles. Dirofilaria immitis, or the heartworm, has an indirect life cycle, for example. The microfilariae must first be ingested by a female mosquito, where it develops into the infective larval stage. The mosquito then bites an animal and transmits the infective larvae into the animal, where they migrate to the pulmonary artery and mature into adults.

Those parasites that infect a single species have direct life cycles. An example of a parasite with a direct life cycle is Ancylostoma caninum, or the canine hookworm. They develop to the infective larval stage in the environment, then penetrate the skin of the dog directly and mature to adults in the small intestine.

If a parasite has to infect a given host in order to complete its life cycle, then it is said to be an obligate parasite of that host; sometimes, infection is facultative—the parasite can survive and complete its life cycle without infecting that particular host species. Parasites sometimes infect hosts in which they cannot complete their life cycles; these are accidental hosts.

A host in which parasites reproduce sexually is known as the definitive, final or primary host. In intermediate hosts, parasites either do not reproduce or do so asexually, but the parasite always develops to a new stage in this type of host. In some cases a parasite will infect a host, but not undergo any development, these hosts are known as paratenic or transport hosts. The paratenic host can be useful in raising the chance that the parasite will be transmitted to the definitive host. For example, the cat lungworm (Aelurostrongylus abstrusus) uses a slug or snail as an intermediate host; the first stage larva enters the mollusk and develops to the third stage larva, which is infectious to the definitive host—the cat. If a mouse eats the slug, the third stage larva will enter the mouse's tissues, but will not undergo any development.

Life cycle of the apicomplexan, single-celled parasite Babesia, including infection of humans

== Evolution ==
The primitive type of life cycle probably had haploid individuals with asexual reproduction. Bacteria and archaea exhibit a life cycle like this, and some eukaryotes apparently do too (e.g., Cryptophyta, Choanoflagellata, many Euglenozoa, many Amoebozoa, some red algae, some green algae, the imperfect fungi, some rotifers and many other groups, not necessarily haploid). However, these eukaryotes probably are not primitively asexual, but have lost their sexual reproduction, or it just was not observed yet. Many eukaryotes (including animals and plants) exhibit asexual reproduction, which may be facultative or obligate in the life cycle, with sexual reproduction occurring more or less frequently.

Individual organisms participating in a biological life cycle ordinarily age and die, while cells from these organisms that connect successive life cycle generations (germ line cells and their descendants) are potentially immortal. The basis for this difference is a fundamental problem in biology. The Russian biologist and historian Zhores A. Medvedev considered that the accuracy of genome replicative and other synthetic systems alone cannot explain the immortality of germlines. Rather Medvedev thought that known features of the biochemistry and genetics of sexual reproduction indicate the presence of unique information maintenance and restoration processes at the gametogenesis stage of the biological life cycle. In particular, Medvedev considered that the most important opportunities for information maintenance of germ cells are created by recombination during meiosis and DNA repair; he saw these as processes within the germ line cells that were capable of restoring the integrity of DNA and chromosomes from the types of damage that cause irreversible ageing in non-germ line cells, e.g. somatic cells.

The ancestry of each present day cell presumably traces back, in an unbroken lineage for over 3 billion years to the origin of life. It is not actually cells that are immortal but multi-generational cell lineages. The immortality of a cell lineage depends on the maintenance of cell division potential. This potential may be lost in any particular lineage because of cell damage, terminal differentiation as occurs in nerve cells, or programmed cell death (apoptosis) during development. Maintenance of cell division potential of the biological life cycle over successive generations depends on the avoidance and the accurate repair of cellular damage, particularly DNA damage. In sexual organisms, continuity of the germline over successive cell cycle generations depends on the effectiveness of processes for avoiding DNA damage and repairing those DNA damages that do occur. Sexual processes in eukaryotes provide an opportunity for effective repair of DNA damages in the germ line by homologous recombination.

== See also ==
- Generation time – Average time from one generation to another within the same population
- Parasexual cycle – Nonsexual mechanism for transferring genetic material without meiosis
- Parthenogenesis – Asexual reproduction without fertilization
- Metamorphosis – Profound change in body structure during the post-embryonic development of an organism
- Reproductive biology – Branch of biology studying reproduction
- Mitotic recombination – Type of genetic recombination

== Sources ==
- van den Hoek, C.; Mann; Jahns, H. M. (1995). Algae: An Introduction to Phycology. Cambridge University Press. ISBN 978-0-521-31687-3.
