= Commation cryoporinum =

Scientific classification
- Domain: Eukaryota
- Clade: Sar
- Clade: Stramenopiles
- Clade: incertae sedis
- Order: Commatiida
- Family: Commatiidae
- Genus: Commation
- Species: C. cryoporinum

Binomial name
- Commation cryoporinum Thomsen & Larsen, 1993

Species of nanoplankton

Commation cryoporinum is a species of heterotrophic protists discovered in 1993 in Antarctic waters. It is one of two species in the Commatiida, an order of stramenopiles closely related to actinophryids, a group of heliozoan protists, and to raphidophytes, a group of algae.

== Etymology ==
The name of the species derives from Greek cryos 'ice' and oporinos 'autumnal', a reference to the Herbst im Eis (meaning "Autumn in Ice") expedition which allowed the collection of this species. The name of the genus derives from Latin comma, which references the general biconvex shape of the cell.

== Morphology ==
Commation cryoporinum is a species of unicellular eukaryotes composed of oval cells measuring 7–14 × 5–8 μm. They present a conspicuous proboscis measuring 9–14 μm in length and 2–4 μm in diameter at the base, relatively short and thick in comparison to the longer and thinner proboscis of Commation eposianum. Their complex cytoskeleton is dominated by microtubular components, not conspicuous under light microscopy. Two kinds of extrusomes can occur in both the cell body and the proboscis; the largest ones are visible under light microscopy, appearing as small refractile bodies. In contrast, C. eposianum only presents one type of extrusomes which is never visible under light microscopy.
