= Informal group =

Informal group may refer to:

- informal group (taxonomy)
- informal group (society)
