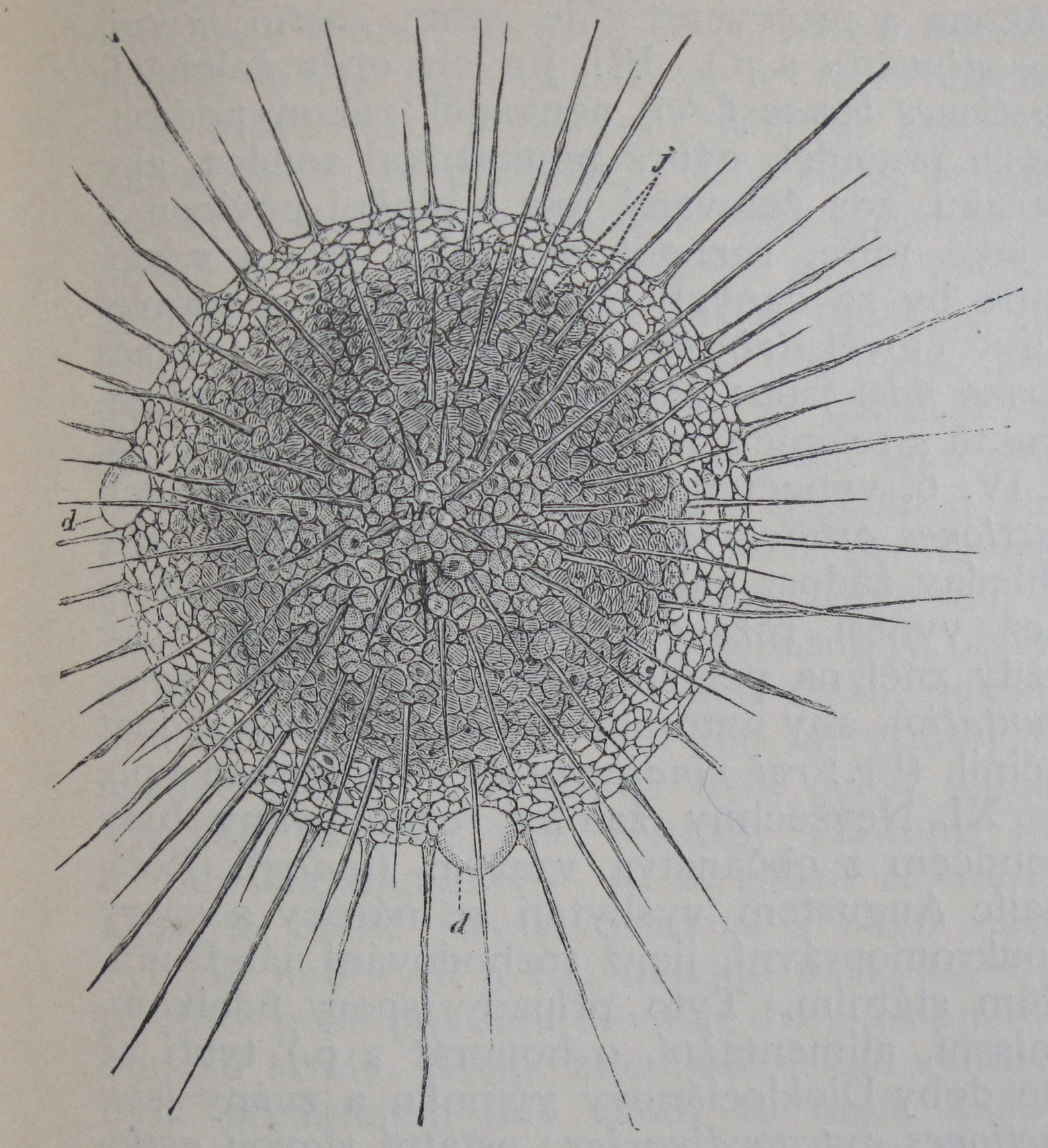
- Actinosphaerium eichhornii

Scientific classification
- Domain: Eukaryota
- Clade: Sar
- Clade: Stramenopiles
- Order: Actinophryida
- Family: Actinophryidae
- Genus: Actinosphaerium; Ritter von Stein, 1857

Type species
- Actinosphaerium eichhornii (Ehrenberg, 1840) Stein, 1857

Synonyms
- Echinosphoerium/Echinosphaerium Hovasse, 1965; Camptonema Schaudinn, 1894

= Actinosphaerium =

Genus of heliozoan protists

Actinosphaerium is a genus of heliozoa, amoeboid unicellular organisms with many axopodial filaments that radiate out of their cell. It is classified within the monotypic family Actinosphaeriidae and suborder Actinosphaerina. Species of Actinosphaerium are distinguished by their large number of nuclei in each cell. Their axopodia sometimes terminate on the surface of nuclei. Vacuoles are abundant in the periphery of the cytoplasm.

== Morphology ==
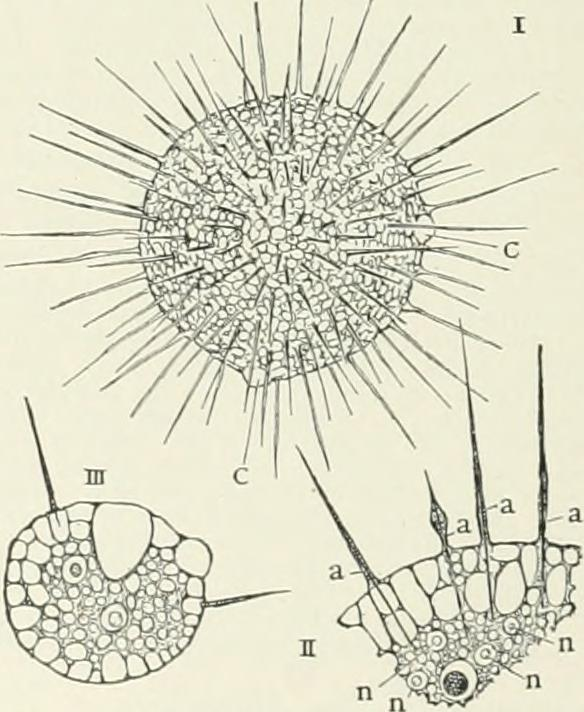
Actinosphaerium eichhornii illustration. n: nucleus, a: axopodium. Note the higher density of vacuoles in the peripheric ectoplasm.

Actinosphaerium species belong to an informal group known as heliozoa, which are unicellular eukaryotes (or protists) that are heterotrophic (also known as protozoa) and present slender, radiating, specialized pseudopodia known as axopodia. Its cell structure has been studied profusely through electron microscopy during the 20th century. Actinosphaerium cells are spherical and multinucleate (i.e. have more than one cell nucleus), as opposed to Actinophrys species which are uninucleate. The axonemes of their axopodia may or may not end on the surface of their nuclei. Their cells range from 200 to 2600 μm in diameter.

The cytoplasm of Actinosphaerium species is divided into a highly vacuolated ectoplasm (i.e. with numerous non-contractile vacuoles) and a less vacuolated endoplasm. Multiple long, slender axopodia radiate out of the cell body. Each axopodium is composed of a relatively stiff axial rod, surrounded by a thin layer of ectoplasm. The rods penetrate deep into the endoplasm and can terminate freely or close to the cell nuclei.

== Ecology ==
Actinosphaerium is a freshwater genus of protists. It has been observed consuming a diverse range of prey such as midge larvae, sessile colonial ciliates and several rotifer species.

== Systematics ==
=== Taxonomy ===
Actinosphaerium was created by German zoologist Ritter von Stein in 1857 to accommodate the species Actinophrys eichhornii (now Actinosphaerium eichhornii), distinguished from current Actinophrys species by a large number of nuclei.

In 1965, Hovasse divided Actinosphaerium to create the genus Echinosphoerium or Echinosphaerium (both spellings were used in his work). He introduced this name for actinosphaerids whose axopodia terminated on the surface of nuclei (specifically A. eichhornii), on the assumption that in Actinosphaerium the axopodia do not end on nuclei. This is supported by many observations. However, the original description of Actinosphaerium by Stein in 1857 mentions no details on this feature. Studies of the ultrastructure of actinosphaerids around the same era showed that some axopodia do end on the nuclei, but not always.

=== Species ===
There are currently two accepted species in the genus.

- Actinosphaerium eichhornii (Ehrenberg, 1840) Stein, 1857
- Actinosphaerium nucleofilum Barrett, 1958 (=Echinosphaerium nucleofilum (Barrett, 1958) Hovasse, 1965)
