= Commation =

Scientific classification
- Domain: Eukaryota
- Clade: Sar
- Clade: Stramenopiles
- Clade: incertae sedis
- Order: Commatiida; Cavalier-Smith 1997
- Family: Commatiidae; Cavalier-Smith & Scoble 2013
- Genus: Commation; Thomsen & Larsen 1993

Type species
- Commation eposianum Thomsen & Larsen 1993

Species
- C. cryoporinum; C. eposianum

Genus of nanoplankton

Commation is a genus of marine heterotrophic protists closely related to the actinophryids. It contains two species, Commation cryoporinum and Commation eposianum, discovered in antarctic waters and described in 1993. Currently, the genus is classified within a monotypic family Commatiidae and order Commatiida. Along with the actinophryids and photosynthetic raphidophytes, these organisms compose the class of stramenopiles known as Raphidomonadea.

== Etymology ==
The name of the genus, Commation, derives from Latin comma, referring to the overall comma shape of the biconvex cells.

== Morphology ==
Commation is a genus of unicellular eukaryotes. They are solitary planktonic organisms that live as circular or oval, sometimes flattened, cells with a proboscis. Occasionally, a single flagellum with tripartite hairs (or mastigonemes) emerges from the proximity of the proboscis. They predominantly move by gliding, a motion facilitated by excretion of mucus. The cell nucleus appears at the base of the proboscis. The presence of two flagellar basal bodies hints at their stramenopile origin, since two heterokont flagella (one smooth, one with mastigonemes) are the main distinguishing trait of the Stramenopiles. They also present microtubular roots and a striated root or rhizoplast, a fiber connecting the nucleus to the basal bodies.

The mitochondria of Commation species have tubular cristae. One or more types of extrusomes occur scattered throughout the cytoplasm. One species, C. cryoporinum, presents two types of extrusomes, some of them visible under light microscopy when large enough. The other species, C. eposianum, only contains one type of extrusome that is not visible. The complex cytoskeleton of Commation contains structures consisting of microtubular arrays and electron-dense structures, present in both the cell bodies and proboscis.

== Ecology ==
Commation cells are phagotrophic and non-photosynthetic, unlike their raphidophyte relatives. They live as plankton on the Antarctic Ocean, and were obtained at a depth of 10–20 meters. A single cell similar to C.eposianum was found in a cover slip preparation belonging to a 1989 sample obtained from a Pacific Ocean cruise off California, indicating that the genus Commation may not be endemic to the Antarctic region. Despite being heterotrophic, they are classified as part of the phytoplankton in ecological surveys.

== Systematics ==
Commation was described as a genus by two biologists of the University of Copenhagen, Helge Abildhauge Thomsen and Jacob Larsen. The description was published in 1993 on the European Journal of Protistology. Subsequent taxonomic research papers assigned Commation to a monotypic family Commatiidae and order Commatiida. The order Commatiida was initially assigned to the class Kinetomonadea on the basis of branched tubular mitochondrial cristae. Phylogenetic analyses in 2013 demonstrated that both Commation and a group of heliozoa known as Actinophryida were related to the raphidophyte algae. The first two groups, while heterotrophic, were united in the subclass Raphopoda, while the raphidophyte algae were given their own subclass Raphidophycidae. Together, these two subclasses currently compose the class Raphidomonadea.

=== Species ===
Two species have been described:

- Commation cryoporinum Thomsen & Larsen, 1993
- Commation eposianum Thomsen & Larsen, 1993
