= Chattonella =

Scientific classification
- Domain: Eukaryota
- Clade: Sar
- Clade: Stramenopiles
- Division: Ochrophyta
- Class: Raphidophyceae
- Order: Chattonellales
- Family: Chattonellaceae
- Genus: Chattonella; Biecheler 1936

Type species
- Chatonella subsalsa Biecheler 1936

Species
- ?C. harima Okaichi; C. antiqua (Hada 1974) Ono 1980; C. marina (Subrahmanyan 1954) Hara & Chihara 1982; C. minima Hara & Chihara 1994; C. ovata Hara & Chihara 1994; C. subsalsa Biecheler 1936

Synonyms
- Hornellia Subrahmanyan 1954 non Walker 1904; Hemieutreptia Hada 1974

Genus of algae

Chattonella is a genus of the marine class raphidophytes associated with red tides and can be found in the phylum Heterokontophyta in stramenopiles. These unicellular flagellates are found in brackish ecosystems. The genus Chattonella is composed of five species: C. subsalsa, C. antiqua, C. marina, C. minima, and C. ovata.

== Structure and synthesis ==
The Chattonella species contain an ectoplasm with vacuoles, chloroplasts, and mucocysts and an endoplasm with a nucleus and other organelles. Due to their lack of cell wall, these species have the ability to change size and shape. Therefore, fish populations cannot recognize the toxins and cannot defend themselves. Each species of the Chattonella genus is very similar or identical in DNA sequencing. C. minima has an identical morphological structure to C. antiqua, so researchers are developing ways to search for the gene responsible for differentiating between the different Chattonella strains. The only currently known difference between the two strains is the number of chromosomes; C. minima contains 90-110 chromosomes while C. marina contains 29 chromosomes.

Chattonella algal blooms synthesis is compared to "diatom resting hypothesis" with the only major difference being that Chattonella cysts can germinate in the dark as opposed to diatoms which can germinate only in sunlight. Factors such as water temperature, salinity, irradiance, and nutrients each contribute to the growth of Chattonella.

== Environmental impact ==
Algal species can be beneficial, neutral, or harmful to environmental ecosystems. Three of these species, C. antiqua, C. marina, and C. ovata, contribute the growing problem of harmful algal blooms (HAB). Chattonella outbreaks are known to be enhanced by eutrophication. C. verruculosa was originally categorized with these toxic species, but further phylogenetic analysis showed it actually belonged to class Dictyochophyceae, not Raphidophyceae. These harmful algal species trigger the necrosis of gill cells in fish. More specifically, the toxins produce reactive oxygen species that disrupt oxygen transport and ultimately lead to suffocation. Fish species such as Thunnus maccoyii, Seriola quinqueradiata, and others are declining rapidly in Australia, Japan, India, China, Brazil, Mexico, and USA, greatly affecting fishing industries. As HABs become more common, more research is dedicated to preventing these outbreaks.

== Analysis methods ==
To prevent Chattonella HABs, the individual species must first be studied. A technique using monoclonal antibodies can be used to identify the genus, while the RAPD reaction can be used to distinguish between different species within the genus. Other researchers use PCR-RFLP is also used to identify species of Chattonella. They sequence ITS rDNA and rRNA, and mitochondrial DNA of the species to try to target the highly variable regions with molecular markers. Inverted optical microscopes and scanning electron microscopes (SEM) are also used to compare cell size and structure of different Chattonella species.
