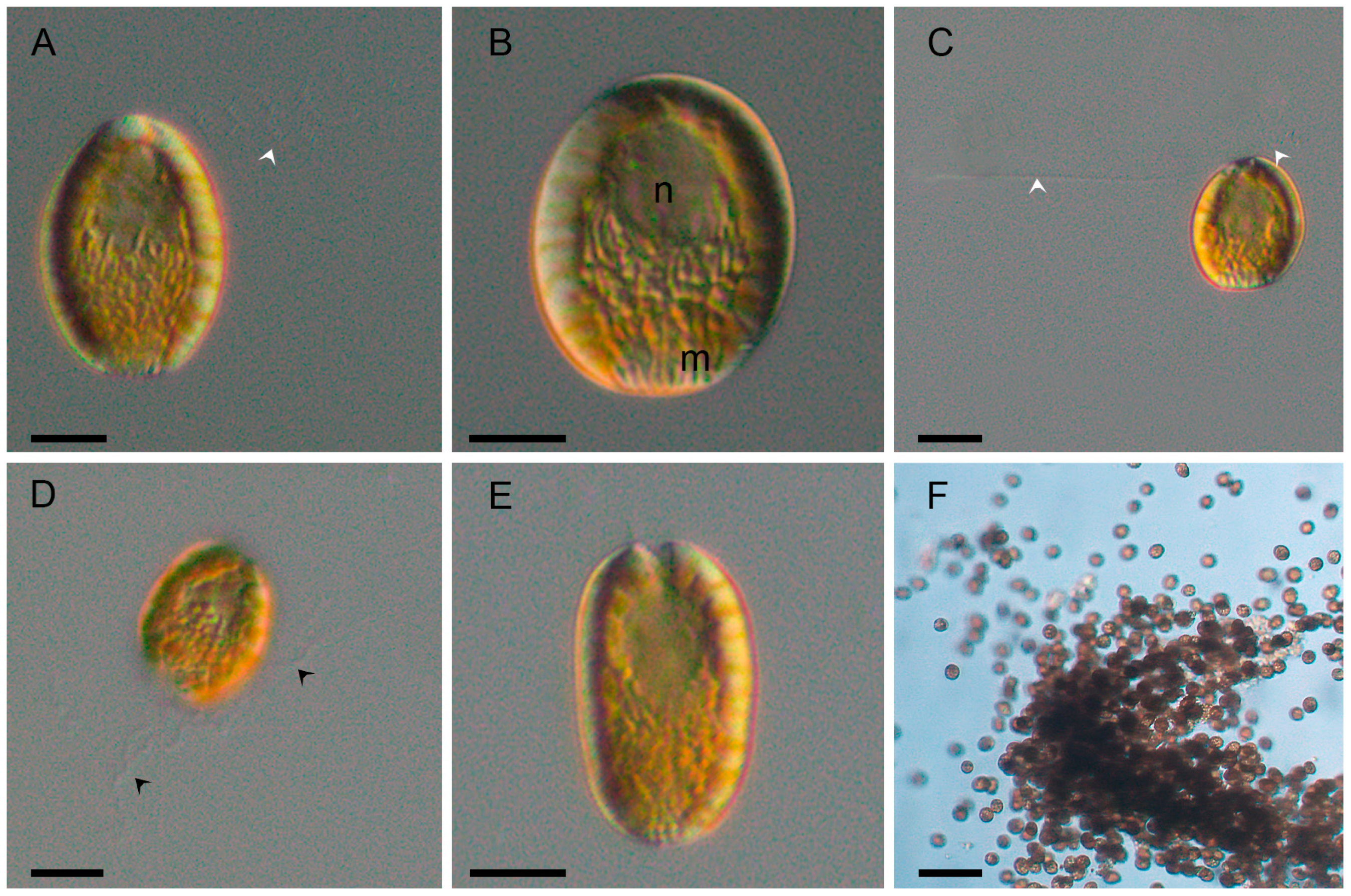
- Light microscopy images of F. japonica showing flagella (white arrows), nucleus (n), mucocysts (m), and discharged mucocysts (black arrows). Scale bars: 10 µm (A-E), 50 µm (F).

Scientific classification
- Domain: Eukaryota
- Clade: Sar
- Clade: Stramenopiles
- Phylum: Ochrophyta
- Class: Raphidophyceae
- Order: Chattonellales
- Family: Fibrocapsaceae; Cavalier-Smith in Cavalier-Smith & Chao, 2013
- Genus: Fibrocapsa; S.Toriumi & H.Takano, 1973
- Species: F. japonica

Binomial name
- Fibrocapsa japonica S.Toriumi & H.Takano, 1973

= Fibrocapsa =

Genus of algae

Fibrocapsa is a genus of algae belonging to the family Fibrocapsaceae. It is monotypic, containing only the species Fibrocapsa japonica. It belongs to the monotypic family Fibrocapsaceae.
