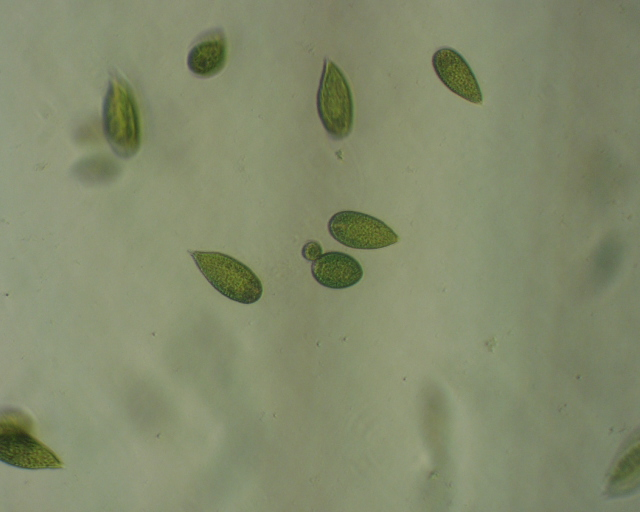

Scientific classification
- Domain: Eukaryota
- Clade: Sar
- Clade: Stramenopiles
- Division: Ochrophyta
- Class: Raphidophyceae
- Order: Chattonellales
- Family: Vacuolariaceae
- Genus: Gonyostomum
- Species: G. semen

Binomial name
- Gonyostomum semen (Ehrenberg) Diesing, 1866

= Gonyostomum semen =

Species of alga

Gonyostomum semen is a species of freshwater algae in the genus Gonyostomum, with worldwide distribution. They cause nuisance algal blooms and are known to cause allergic reactions to people swimming in lakes.

== Distribution ==
This freshwater microalgal species is globally distributed. It usually occurs in small, acidic lakes with high concentrations of dissolved organic carbon, which result in sharp gradients of light intensity due to rapid attenuation of light with depth. During the last decades, G. semen has spread in northern Europe to many non-humic lakes with higher pH. There is evidence that brownification of lakes in these areas, decreasing pH and higher water temperature initiated the spreading of this species.

== Physiology ==
The drop-shaped, vegetative cells of G. semen are up to 100 μm long, but can vary quite a bit in form and size, as they are only surrounded by a cell membrane instead of a cell wall. These microalgae are, therefore, highly fragile and sensitive to mechanical stress. The cells are filled with many bright green, oval chloroplasts. The bright green color is caused by the pigment chlorophyll a. Additionally, G. semen displays the pigments chlorophyll c1 and c2, diadinoxanthin, trans-neoxanthin, cis-neoxanthin, α and β carotene, violaxanthin, zeaxanthin and alloxanthin. Like other heterokont algae, the planktonic cells of G. semen possess two differently shaped flagella, which enable them to actively swim around in the water column. Under physical stress, small organelles that sit under the cell membrane and are called trichocysts, explode and release slimy threads. This likely represents a deterring mechanism against predators. These slimy threads also cause skin irritation for some bathers that are swimming in G. semen blooms.

In temperate regions, this species forms blooms during the summer. In spring, vegetative cells hatch from resting stages called cysts. The vegetative cells mainly reproduce asexually through division of the mother cell into two daughter cells. During unfavorable conditions, the motile cells can also form temporary resting stages, which usually germinate within a few days. At the end of summer, vegetative cells divide into two gametes, which fuse later to a planozygote. After these steps of sexual recombination, the planozygotes form resting cysts, which sink to the sediment, where they outlast the winter. These resting stages are much more robust than vegetative cells.

== Ecology ==
Gonyostomum semen can germinate from its resting stages under many environmental conditions, which probably facilitates the dispersal to new habitats. Additionally, this species can grow in a wide range of pH and light conditions allowing the frequent formation of blooms in summer. G. semen has also been shown to benefit from high availability of iron. Lack of efficient grazers in several lakes and the ability to feed on dissolved organic matter might further help G. semen to thrive in many different habitats.
