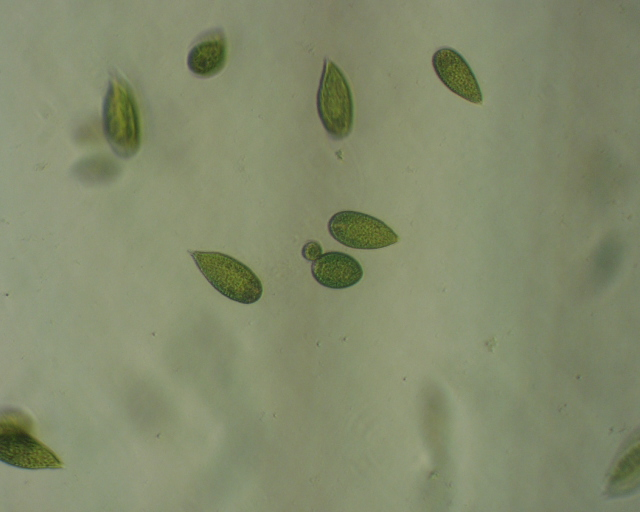

Scientific classification
- Domain: Eukaryota
- Clade: Sar
- Clade: Stramenopiles
- Phylum: Ochrophyta
- Class: Raphidophyceae
- Order: Chattonellales
- Family: Vacuolariaceae
- Genus: Gonyostomum; Diesing 1866

Type species
- Gonyostomum semen (Ehrenberg 1853) Diesing 1866

Species
- Gonyostomum depressum (Lauterborn 1897) Lemmermann 1908; Gonyostomum intermedium Skuja 1956; Gonyostomum latum Ivanov 1900; Gonyostomum ovatum Fott 1952; Gonyostomum semen (Ehrenberg 1853) Diesing 1866; Gonyostomum sinensis Jao 1978

Synonyms
- Raphidomonas Stein 1878

= Gonyostomum =

Genus of algae

Gonyostomum is a genus of freshwater algae in the class Raphidophyceae. They include the species Gonyostomum semen, which causes nuisance algal blooms.
