= Association (ecology) =

Community of native species in an area, in ecology

In phytosociology and community ecology, an association is a ecological community characterized by a definite species composition, a consistent physiognomy, and occurrence under similar habitat conditions. Although the concept has its roots in Alexander von Humboldt's early plant geography, its modern phytosociological definition was developed by Charles Flahault and Carl Joseph Schröter, formally adopted by the Third International Botanical Congress in 1910, and later became the fundamental unit of Braun-Blanquet vegetation classification.

== Concept ==
Associations are best defined by their physical characteristics or diagnostic species in that environment, such as soil type, climate, and disturbance regime. Josias Braun-Blanquet developed a phytosociological system in which associations served as the basic unit of vegetation classification and began naming vegetation by its dominant characteristics, often using standardized Latinized nomenclature. These units can be grouped into higher-order categories, such as alliances, orders, and classes, forming a comprehensive system for describing vegetation patterns.

Over time, the concept of association has been debated in the ecology community due to its nature. One perspective that was frequently raised was that of Frederic Clements, who viewed the association as a highly integrated, quasi-organismic entity. This means that communities develop through succession, aiming for a stable climax state; species in these communities are highly interdependent.

== Opposing view ==
In contrast, Henry Gleason developed the concept of individualism in vegetation. This idea was that an association does not represent a discrete unit but rather reflects many species with similar environmental tolerances. In this view, community compositions vary continuously over time and are shaped by independent species responding to environmental factors, dispersal, and stochastic events such as disturbances and colonizations.

== Fusion ==
Modern ecology recognizes elements of both perspectives. Some communities exhibit relatively discrete, repeatable compositions that can be classified into associations; others show gradual transitions and high variability. As a result, associations often use a useful, descriptive, and practical unit for vegetation mapping, conservation planning, and ecological monitoring rather than a strictly bounded natural entity.

== Practical uses ==
Beyond the theoretical debates, the concept of association has practical use in fields such as habitat conservation, land management, and biodiversity assessment. By identifying vegetation types and their associated environmental conditions, ecologists can better predict ecosystem responses to a changing environment and provide appropriate restoration plans for impacted areas.

== See also ==
- Plant community
- Species aggregate
- Alliance (taxonomy)
