= Alliance (taxonomy) =

Informal grouping used in biological taxonomy

An alliance is an informal grouping used in biological taxonomy. The term "alliance" is not a taxonomic rank defined in any of the nomenclature codes. It is used for any group of species, genera or tribes to which authors wish to refer, that have at some time provisionally been considered to be closely related.

The term is often used for a group that authors are studying in further detail in order to refine the complex taxonomy. For example, a molecular phylogenetics study of the Aerides–Vanda Alliance (Orchidaceae: Epidendroideae) confirmed that the group is monophyletic, and clarified which species belong in each of the 14 genera. In other orchid groups, the various alliances that have been defined do not correspond well to clades.

Historically, some 19th century botanical authors used alliance to denote groups that would now be considered orders. This usage is now obsolete, and the ICN (Article 17.2) specifies that such taxa are treated as orders.

== See also ==
- Species aggregate
- Association (ecology)
- Bioindicator
