= Bacillarnavirus =

Virus classification
- (unranked): Virus
- Realm: Riboviria
- Kingdom: Orthornavirae
- Phylum: Pisuviricota
- Class: Pisoniviricetes
- Order: Picornavirales
- Family: Marnaviridae
- Genus: Bacillarnavirus

Genus of viruses

Bacillarnavirus is a genus of viruses in the family Marnaviridae. Marine diatoms serve as natural hosts. There are three species in this genus.

== Taxonomy ==
The genus contains the following species, listed by scientific name and followed by the exemplar virus of the species:

- Bacillarnavirus nagasakii, Rhizosolenia setigera RNA virus 01
- Bacillarnavirus setoensis, Chaetoceros tenuissimus RNA virus 01
- Bacillarnavirus yujii, Chaetoceros socialis forma radians RNA virus 1

== Structure ==
Viruses in Bacillarnavirus are non-enveloped, with icosahedral, spherical, and round geometries, and T=pseudo3 symmetry. The diameter is around 30-32 nm. Genomes are linear and non-segmented, around 8.8-9.5kb in length. The genome has 2 open reading frames.

| Genus | Structure | Symmetry | Capsid | Genomic arrangement | Genomic segmentation |
|---|---|---|---|---|---|
| Bacillarnavirus | Icosahedral | Pseudo T=3 | Non-enveloped | Linear | Monopartite |

== Life cycle ==
Viral replication is cytoplasmic. Entry into the host cell is achieved by attachment of the virus to host receptors, which mediates endocytosis. Replication follows the positive stranded RNA virus replication model. Positive stranded RNA virus transcription is the method of transcription. Marine diatoms serve as the natural host.

| Genus | Host details | Tissue tropism | Entry details | Release details | Replication site | Assembly site | Transmission |
|---|---|---|---|---|---|---|---|
| Bacillarnavirus | Marine diatoms | None | Unknown | Lysis | Cytoplasm | Cytoplasm | Unknown |
