= Labyrnavirus =

Virus classification
- (unranked): Virus
- Realm: Riboviria
- Kingdom: Orthornavirae
- Phylum: Pisuviricota
- Class: Pisoniviricetes
- Order: Picornavirales
- Family: Marnaviridae
- Genus: Labyrnavirus
- Species: Labyrnavirus takaoii

Genus of viruses

Labyrnavirus is a monotypic genus of viruses in the order Picornavirales. Protist and labyrinthulomycetes serve as natural hosts, notably Aurantiochytrium. There is only one species in this genus: Aurantiochytrium single-stranded RNA virus 01 (Labyrnavirus takaoii).

== Structure ==
Viruses in Labyrnavirus are non-enveloped, with icosahedral, spherical, and round geometries, and T=pseudo3 symmetry. The diameter is around 25 nm. Genomes are linear and non-segmented, around 9kb in length. The genome has three open reading frames.

Genus	Structure	Symmetry	Capsid	Genomic arrangement	Genomic segmentation
Labyrnavirus	Icosahedral	Pseudo T=3	Non-enveloped	Linear	Monopartite

== Life cycle ==
Viral replication is cytoplasmic. Entry into the host cell is achieved by attachment of the virus to host receptors, which mediates endocytosis. Replication follows the positive stranded RNA virus replication model. Positive stranded RNA virus transcription is the method of transcription. Protist and labyrinthulomycetes serve as the natural host.

Genus	Host details	Tissue tropism	Entry details	Release details	Replication site	Assembly site	Transmission
Labyrnavirus	Protist, Labyrinthulomycetes	None	Unknown	Lysis	Cytoplasm	Cytoplasm	Unknown
