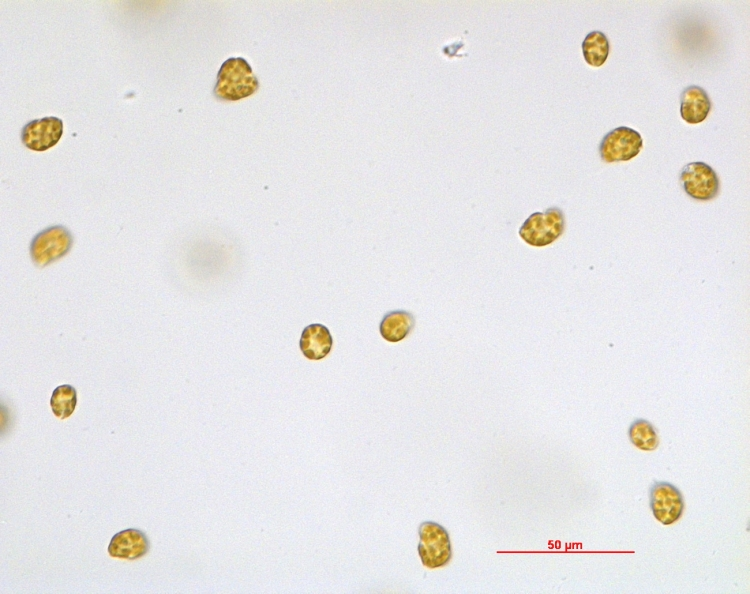

Scientific classification
- Domain: Eukaryota
- Clade: Sar
- Clade: Stramenopiles
- Division: Ochrophyta
- Class: Raphidophyceae
- Order: Chattonellales
- Family: Chattonellaceae
- Genus: Heterosigma
- Species: H. akashiwo

Binomial name
- Heterosigma akashiwo (Y.Hada) Y.Hada ex Y.Hara & M.Chihara

= Heterosigma akashiwo =

Species of alga

Heterosigma akashiwo is a species of microscopic algae of the class Raphidophyceae. It is a swimming marine alga that episodically forms toxic surface aggregations known as harmful algal bloom. The species name akashiwo is from the Japanese for "red tide".

Synonyms include Olisthodiscus carterae (Hulburt 1965), and Entomosigma akashiwo (Hada 1967). H. akashiwo and H. inlandica have been recognized as two species of Heterosigma. However, Hara and Chihara (1987) described both specimens as one species, validly describing them as H. akashiwo.

== Description ==
Heterosigma akashiwo cells are relatively small, ranging in size from 18 to 34 μm in diameter. They appear golden brown, and appear in clusters. Morphology is highly variable, but does not appear to vary significantly between locations. One culture may contain flat or round individual cells. Molecular techniques for identification (including quantitative PCR) are preferred over traditional microscope fixing, which may lyse the cells. Additionally, the sandwich hybridization assay (which targets ribosomal RNA (rRNA), and an end-point polymerase chain reaction (PCR) assay, which targets internal transcribed spacer (ITS) sequences of rRNA genes) was found to identity Heterosigma akashiwo in central California waters, O'Halloran et al. 2006.

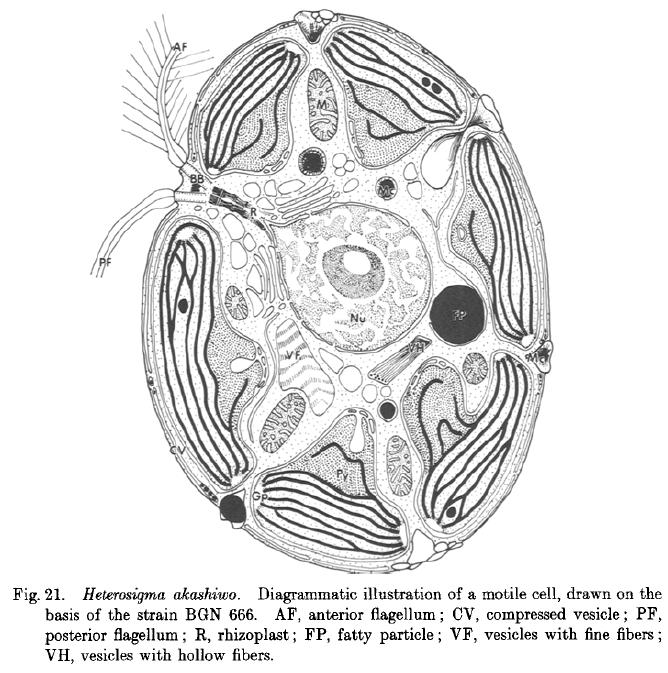
Heterosigma akashiwo anatomy from Hara and Chihara 1987

== Distribution ==
Heterosigma akashiwo has been identified off the coasts of the United States, Canada, Chile, the Netherlands, Scotland, Ireland, Sweden, Norway, Japan, S.Korea, Hong Kong, Australia, New Zealand and South Africa. Most of the literature suggests H. akashiwo is associated with shallow water within 10 m of the surface, but this is not a universal rule.

== Physiology ==
Heterosigma akashiwo is a mixotrophic alga, supplementing nutrient uptake and photosynthesis with ingestion of bacteria. Each cell may contain 18-27 chloroplasts. These cells have been observed to glide and twirl under microscopic examination, but nonmotile cells have been associated with toxic blooms. Blooms are clearly visible by air, appearing as a red area in otherwise blue water. Optimal growth occurs at 25 °C and 100 μE m^{−2}s_{−1}, conditions which are associated with very low toxicity. Maximum toxicity occurs (and relatively slow growth) occurs at 20 °C and 200 μE m^{−2}s_{−1}. H. akashiwo reproduces asexually by binary fission.

Heterosigma akashiwo produces cysts as a resting stage. The germination of these cysts leads to large-scale blooms, which can be laterally transferred by tides and currents. A 2007 review of these blooms in Puget Sound suggested that salmon farming was probably not a strong driver of their incidence or severity. Bottom water temperature must reach at least 15 °C for germination to occur. Blooms are most often associated with summer months, and some areas may see two blooms within one year. Blooms are known to be lethal once concentrations of cells reach 3 × 10^{5} to 7 × 10^{5} cells/L. Viruses may act as a natural control on bloom populations, as H. akashiwo viruses (HaV) have been shown to only leave resistant alga alive. Similarly, certain bacteria may also reduce H. akashiwo populations.

The exact mode of bloom toxicity is currently unknown, but gill damage leading to hypoxia is the proposed cause for fish death. H. akashiwo may produce brevetoxins, but others suggest the concentrations of these toxins are too low to account for such a large effect on fish populations. Some have argued the production of reactive oxygen species like hydrogen peroxide may be responsible for gill damage. However, research suggests hydrogen peroxide concentrations are far too low to have significant effects on fish. Mucus production is another proposed, but poorly supported, mechanism for fish mortality. The effective toxin possibly is chemically unstable, and therefore difficult to detect. Sablefish appear to be unaffected by H. akashiwo blooms, while many other marine fish are decimated.

== Genetics ==
Genetic sequences are highly conserved between Pacific and Atlantic populations. Relevant probe sequences for small subunit RNA can be found.

== Economic impact ==
Heterosigma forms massive golden tides that impact the survival of organisms at every trophic level. This alga has been shown to kill finfish, compromise fish and sea urchin egg development, and impact copepods, as well as oyster survival. Further ecological impacts to plankton, invertebrates, and wild fish are likely, but unknown. The 1997 H. akashiwo bloom in British Columbia, for example, coincided with a dramatic increase in mortality of captive salmon. H. akashiwo contributed to the loss of over 1,000 tons of Atlantic salmon in 2001. A bloom in Puget Sound in 2006 led to the loss of $2 million of farmed salmon. In 2014, a bloom near Port Hardy, British Columbia, killed nearly 280,000 Atlantic salmon. In 2018, a bloom near British Columbia killed near 250,000 Atlantic salmon at two seafood farms. In March 2022, a H. akashiwo bloom, triggered by sewage pollution, in the Swartkops River estuary in Port Elizabeth, South Africa, killed thousands of fish and crustaceans, compromising the ecosystem value of the estuary as a "fish nursery" that benefits ecosystem diversity and the fishing industry. 1995 article noted that the global distribution of H. akashiwo is increasing, as is the frequency of H. akashiwo HAB formation.
