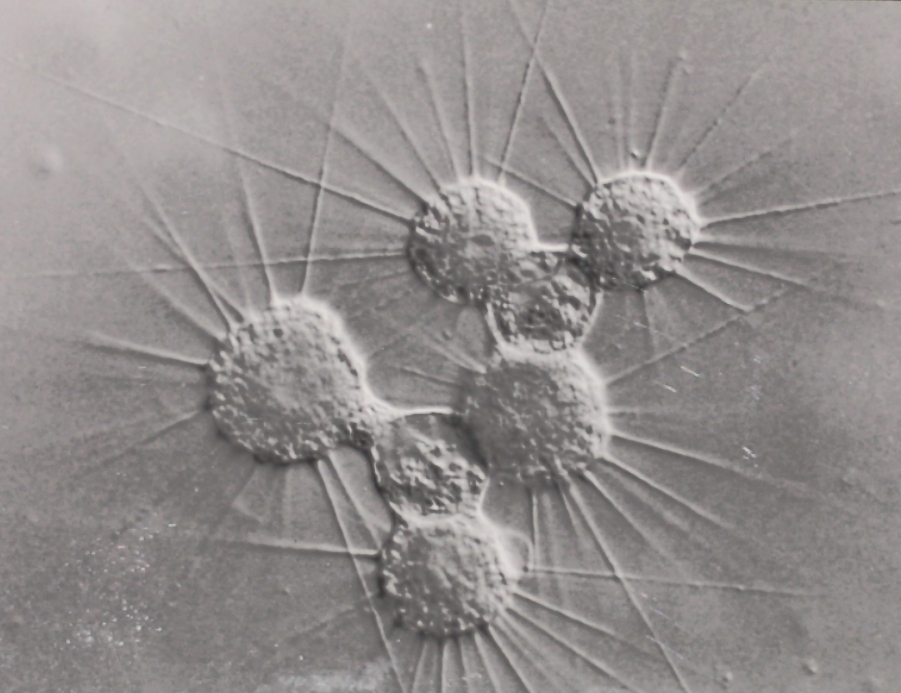
- Actinophrys undergoing multiple plasmotomy

Scientific classification
- Domain: Eukaryota
- Clade: Sar
- Clade: Stramenopiles
- Order: Actinophryida
- Family: Actinophryidae
- Genus: Actinophrys; Ehrenberg, 1830

Type species
- Actinophrys sol (Müller, 1773) Ehrenberg, 1830

Species
- A. sol; A. pontica; A. salsuginosa; A. tauryanini

Synonyms
- Trichoda Müller 1773 nomen oblitum; Peritricha Bory de St.Vincent 1824 nomen dubium non Stein 1859

= Actinophrys =

Genus of heliozoan protists

Actinophrys is a genus of heliozoa, amoeboid unicellular organisms with many axopodial filaments that radiate out of their cell. It contains one of the most common heliozoan species, Actinophrys sol. It is classified within the monotypic family Actinophryidae.

== Characteristics ==
Actinophrys species belong to an informal group known as heliozoa, which are unicellular eukaryotes (or protists) that are heterotrophic (also known as protozoa) and present stiff radiating arms known as axopodia. In particular, Actinophrys species are characterized by axonemes consisting of double interlocking spirals of microtubules. Their axonemes end on a large central nucleus. They are also characterized by the siliceous material present in their cysts.

== Systematics ==
Actinophrys was described in 1830 by German naturalist Christian Gottfried Ehrenberg, with the type species Actinophrys sol. The species originally belonged to a genus named Trichoda, described earlier by Otto Friedrich Müller and later declared obsolete. In 1824, Bory de St. Vincent transferred that species to a new genus Peritricha but, without any new observations to justify the change, it fell out of use.

=== Species ===
There are currently four accepted species of Actinophrys.

- Actinophrys sol (Müller, 1773) Ehrenberg, 1830 (=A. difformis Ehrenberg, 1830; A. marina Dujardin, 1841; A. stella Perty, 1852; A. oculata Stein, 1854; A. tenuipes Claparède & Lachmann, 1858; A. fissipes Lachmann, 1859; A. longipes Lachmann, 1859; A. tunicata Lachmann, 1859; A. limbata Lachmann, 1859; A. paradoxa Carter, 1864; A. picta Leidy, 1879; A. alveolata Schewiakoff, 1893; A. subalpina West, 1901; A. vesiculata Penard, 1901)
- Actinophrys pontica Valkanov, 1940
- Actinophrys salsuginosa Patterson, 2001
- Actinophrys tauryanini (Mikrjukov, 1996) Mikrjukov & Patterson, 2001
