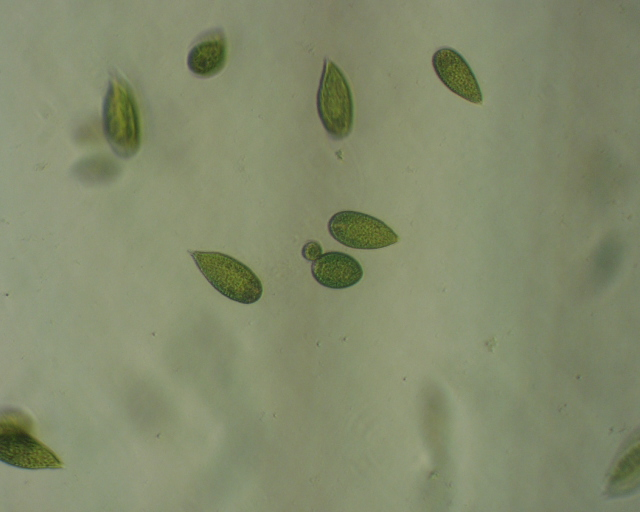
- Gonyostomum semen

Scientific classification
- Domain: Eukaryota
- Clade: Sar
- Clade: Stramenopiles
- Division: Ochrophyta
- Clade: SI
- Class: Raphidophyceae; Chadefaud 1950 emend. Silva 1980
- Order: Chattonellales; Throndsen in Tomas 1993 emend. Yamaguchi, Nakayama, Murakami & Inouye 2010

Families
- Chattonellaceae; Haramonadaceae; Fibrocapsaceae; Vacuolariaceae

Synonyms
- Chloromonadina Klebs 1892; Raphidomonadida Heywood & Leedale 1983; Chloromonadophyceae Rothmaler 1951; Fott 1968; Raphidomonadida Heywood & Leedale 1983; Raphidophycidae Cavalier-Smith in Cavalier-Smith & Chao 2013; Vacuolariales Shameel 2001

= Raphidophyte =

Raphidophytes

Class of aquatic algae

The raphidophytes, previously known as chloromonads, are a small but widespread group of single-celled eukaryotic algae, found in both marine and freshwater environments. They are taxonomically known as class Raphidophyceae and order Chattonellales.

== Characteristics ==
All raphidophytes are unicellular, with large cells (50 to 100 μm), but no cell walls. Raphidophytes possess a pair of flagella, organised such that both originate from the same invagination (or gullet). One flagellum points forwards, and is covered in hair-like mastigonemes, while the other points backwards across the cell surface, lying within a ventral groove. Raphidophytes contain numerous ellipsoid chloroplasts, which contain chlorophylls a, c_{1} and c_{2}. They also make use of accessory pigments including β-carotene and diadinoxanthin. Unlike other heterokontophytes, raphidophytes do not possess the photoreceptive organelle (or eyespot) typical of this group.

In terms of ecology, raphidophytes occur as photosynthetic autotrophs across a range of aquatic systems. Freshwater species are more common in acidic waters, such as pools in bogs. Marine species often produce large blooms in summer, particularly in coastal waters. Off the Japanese coast, the resulting red tides often cause disruption to fish farms, although raphidophytes are not usually responsible for toxic blooms.

== Classification ==
The position of this group varied in former classifications. Some protozoologists treated chloromonads as an order within the phytoflagellates. Some phycologists classified them with the Xanthophyceae and the Eustigmatophyceae in the division Xanthophyta. Others considered them as related to the Chrysophyceae, Dinophyceae, or Cryptophyceae. Cavalier-Smith proposed them as a subclass of algae within the class Raphidomonadea, which also included the heliozoan group Actinophryida and the enigmatic flagellate Commation.

Currently, raphidophytes consist of the class Raphidophyceae, which contains only one order Chattonellales composed of four families.

- Family Chattonellaceae Throndsen 1993
  - Chattonella Biecheler 1936 (=Hornellia Subrahmanyan 1954, Hemieutreptia Hada 1974)
  - Chlorinimonas Yamaguchi, Nakayama, Murakami & Inouye 2010
  - Heterosigma Hara & Chihara 1987
  - Viridilobus Demir-Hilton, Hutchins, Czymmek & Coyne 2012
- Family Fibrocapsaceae Cavalier-Smith in Cavalier-Smith & Chao 2013
  - Fibrocapsa Toriumi & Tokano 1975
- Family Haramonadaceae Cavalier-Smith in Cavalier-Smith & Chao 2013
  - Haramonas Horiguchi 1996
  - Psammamonas Grant, Waller, Clementson & Wetherbee 2013
- Family Vacuolariaceae Luther 1899 emend. Yamaguchi, Nakayama, Murakami & Inouye 2010
  - Gonyostomum Diesing 1866
  - Merotrichia Mereschkowski 1877
  - Vacuolaria Cienkowski 1870

Several genera have been proposed as raphidophytes but their position remains uncertain. The genus Oltmannsia Schiller 1925 was tentatively placed in the order Chattonellales by Jahn Throndsen in 1993, but it is not included in later studies. Similarly, the genus Swirenkoiamonas Skvortzov 1968 was described as a member of the Chloromonadales, was later regarded as a euglenid in 1991, and is not mentioned by subsequent studies. The genus Olisthodiscus was originally proposed as a raphidophyte, but it currently composes a separate class, Olisthodiscophyceae.
