= Informal group (taxonomy) =

An informal group in taxonomy is a taxonomic rank that is not well defined.

This type of group can be paraphyletic or polyphyletic but is kept for ease, pending new systems of classification.

== In zoology ==
Examples can be found in the classification of gastropods: Opisthobranchia, Sorbeoconcha, Hypsogastropoda, and Ptenoglossa are informal groups nearby the level of the order.

In human taxonomy, the informal taxonomic rank of race is variously considered equivalent or subordinate to the rank of subspecies.

== In botany ==
An alliance is also considered an informal grouping of species, genera or tribes to which authors wish to refer, that have at some time provisionally been considered to be closely related.
