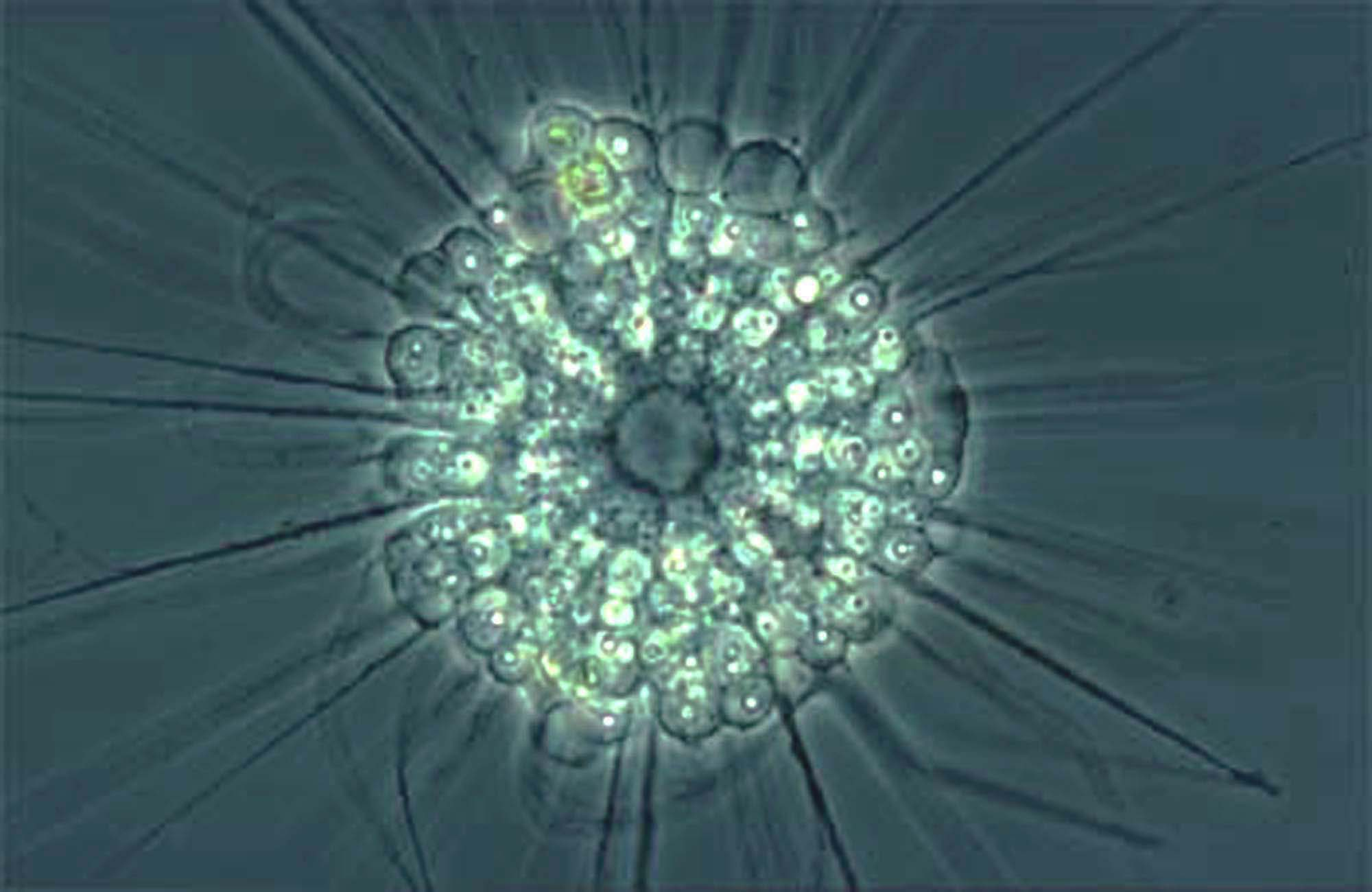

Scientific classification
- Domain: Eukaryota
- Clade: Sar
- Clade: Stramenopiles
- Division: Ochrophyta
- Clade?: SII
- Order: Actinophryida; Hartmann 1913
- Family: Actinophryidae; Dujardin 1841

Genera
- Actinophrys; Actinosphaerium

Diversity
- 6 species

= Actinophryid =

Order of heliozoan protists

The actinophryids are an order of heliozoa, a polyphyletic array of amoebae. They are common in fresh water and occasionally found in marine and soil habitats. Actinophryids are unicellular and roughly spherical in shape, with many axopodia that radiate outward from the cell body. Axopodia are a type of pseudopodia that are supported by hundreds of microtubules arranged in interlocking spirals and forming a needle-like internal structure or axoneme. Small granules, extrusomes, that lie under the membrane of the body and axopodia capture flagellates, ciliates and small metazoa that make contact with the arms.

== Description ==
Actinophryids are largely aquatic protozoa with a spherical cell body and many needle-like axopodia. They resemble the shape of a sun due to this structure, which is the inspiration for their common name: heliozoa, or "sun-animalcules". Their bodies, without arms, range in size from a few tens of micrometers to slightly under a millimeter across.

The outer region of cell body is often vacuolated. The endoplasm of actinophryids is less vacuolated than the outer layer, and a sharp boundary layer may be seen by light microscopy. The organisms can be either mononucleate, with a single, well defined nucleus in the center of the cell body, or multinucleate, with 10 or more nuclei located under the outer vacuolated layer of cytoplasm. The cytoplasm of actinophryids is often granular, similar to that of Amoeba.

Actinophryid cells may fuse when feeding, creating larger aggregated organisms. Fine granules that occur just under the cell membrane are used up when food vacuoles form to enclose prey. Actinophryids may also form cysts when food is not readily available. A layer of siliceous plates is deposited under the cell membrane during the encystment process.

Video of a contractile vacuole collapse in Actinosphaerium

Contractile vacuoles are common in these organisms, which are presumed to use them to maintain body volume by expelling fluids to compensate for the entry of water by osmosis. Contractile vacuoles are visible as clear bulges from the surface of the cell body that slowly fill then rapidly deflate, expelling their contents into the environment.

=== Axopodia ===
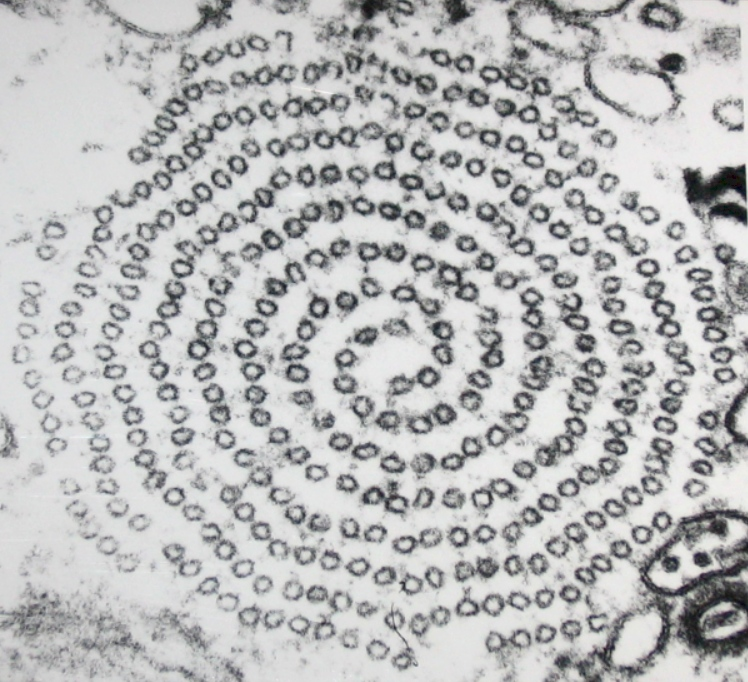
Cross-section of the double spiral microtubule structure in an axopod

The most distinctive characteristic of the actinophryids is their axopodia. These axopodia consist of a central, rigid rod which is coated in a thin layer of ectoplasm. In Actinophrys the axonemes end on the surface of the central nucleus, and in the multicellular Actinosphaerium they end at or near nuclei. The axonemes are composed of microtubules arranged in a double spiral pattern characteristic of the order. Due to their long, parallel construction, these microtubules demonstrate strong birefringence.

These axopodia are used for prey capture, in movement, cell fusion and perhaps division. They are stiff but may flex especially near their tips, and are highly dynamic, undergoing frequent construction and destruction. When used to collect prey items, two methods of capture have been noted, termed axopodial flow and rapid axopodial contraction. Axopodial flow involves the slow movement of a prey item along the surface of the axopod as the ectoplasm itself moves, while rapid axopodial contraction involves the collapse of the axoneme's microtubule structure. This behavior has been documented in many species, including Actinosphaerium nucleofilum, Actinophrys sol, and Raphidiophrys contractilis. The rapid axopodial contraction occurs at high speed, often in excess of 5mm/s or tens of body lengths per second.

The axopodial contractions have been shown to be highly sensitive to environmental factors such as temperature and pressure as well as chemical signals like Ca^{2+} and colchicine.

=== Reproduction ===
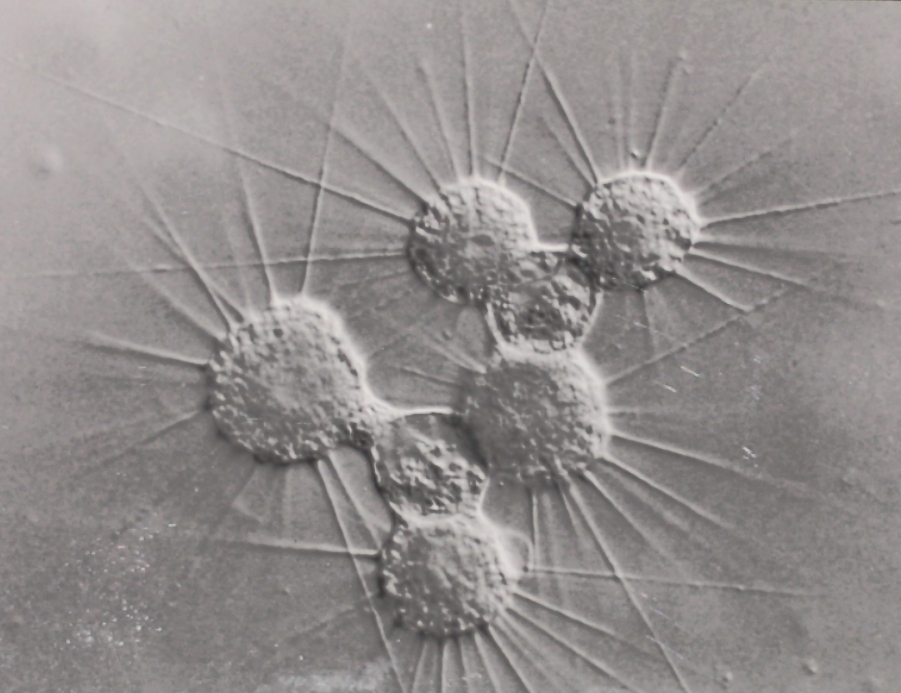
Actinophrys undergoing multiple plasmotomy

Reproduction in actinophryids generally takes place via fission, where one parent cell divides into two or more daughter cells. For multinucleate heliozoa, this process is plasmotomic as the nuclei are not duplicated prior to division. It has been observed that reproduction appears to be a response to food scarcity, with an increased number of divisions following the removal of food and larger organisms during times of food excess.

Actinophryids also undergo autogamy during times of food scarcity. This is better described as genetic reorganization than reproduction, as the number of individuals produced is the same as the initial number. Nonetheless, it serves as a way to increase genetic diversity within an individual which may improve the likelihood of expressing favorable genetic traits.

Plastogamy has also been extensively documented in actinophryids, especially in multinucleate ones. Actinosphaerium were observed to combine freely without the combination of nuclei, and this process sometimes resulted in more or less individuals than originally combined. This process is not caused merely by contact between two individuals but can be caused by damage to the cell body.

=== Cyst function and formation ===
Under unfavourable conditions, some species will form a cyst. This is often the product of autogamy, in which case the cysts produced are zygotes. Cells undergoing this process withdraw their axopodia, adhere to the substrate, and take on an opaque and grayish appearance. This cyst then divides until only uninucleate cells remain. The cyst wall is thickly layered 7–8 times and includes gelatinous layers, layers of silica plates, and iron.

== Taxonomy ==
Originally placed in Heliozoa (Sarcodina), the actinophryids are now understood to be part of the stramenopiles. They are unrelated to centrohelid and desmothoracid heliozoa with which they had been previously classified.

There are several genera included within this classification. Actinophrys are smaller and have a single, central nucleus. Most have a cell body 40–50 micrometer in diameter with axopods around 100 μm in length, though this varies significantly. Actinosphaerium are several times larger, from 200 to 1000 μm in diameter, with many nuclei and are found exclusively in fresh water. A third genus, Camptonema, has a debated status. It has been observed once and was treated as a junior subjective synonym of Actinosphaerium by Mikrjukov & Patterson in 2001, but as a valid genus by Cavalier-Smith & Scoble (2013), although no classification was listed for it. Heliorapha is a further debated taxon, it being a new generic vehicle for the species azurina that was initially assigned to the genus Ciliophrys.

== Classification ==
According to the latest review of actinophryid classifications, they are organized into two genera and six species.

- Order Actinophryida Hartmann 1913
  - Family Actinophryidae Dujardin 1841 [Actinophrydia Kühn 1926; Actinophrydea Hartmann 1913]
    - Actinophrys Ehrenberg 1830 [Trichoda Müller 1773 nomen oblitum; Peritricha Bory de St.Vincent 1824 nomen dubium non Stein 1859] — 4 species.
      - Actinophrys sol (Müller, 1773) Ehrenberg, 1840
      - Actinophrys pontica Valkanov, 1940
      - Actinophrys salsuginosa Patterson, 2001
      - Actinophrys tauryanini (Mikrjukov, 1996) Mikrjukov & Patterson, 2001
    - Actinosphaerium Ritter von Stein 1857 [Echinosphaerium Hovasse 1965] — 4 species.
      - Actinosphaerium eichhornii (Ehrenberg, 1840) Stein, 1857
      - Actinosphaerium nucleofilum Barrett, 1958

== Gallery ==
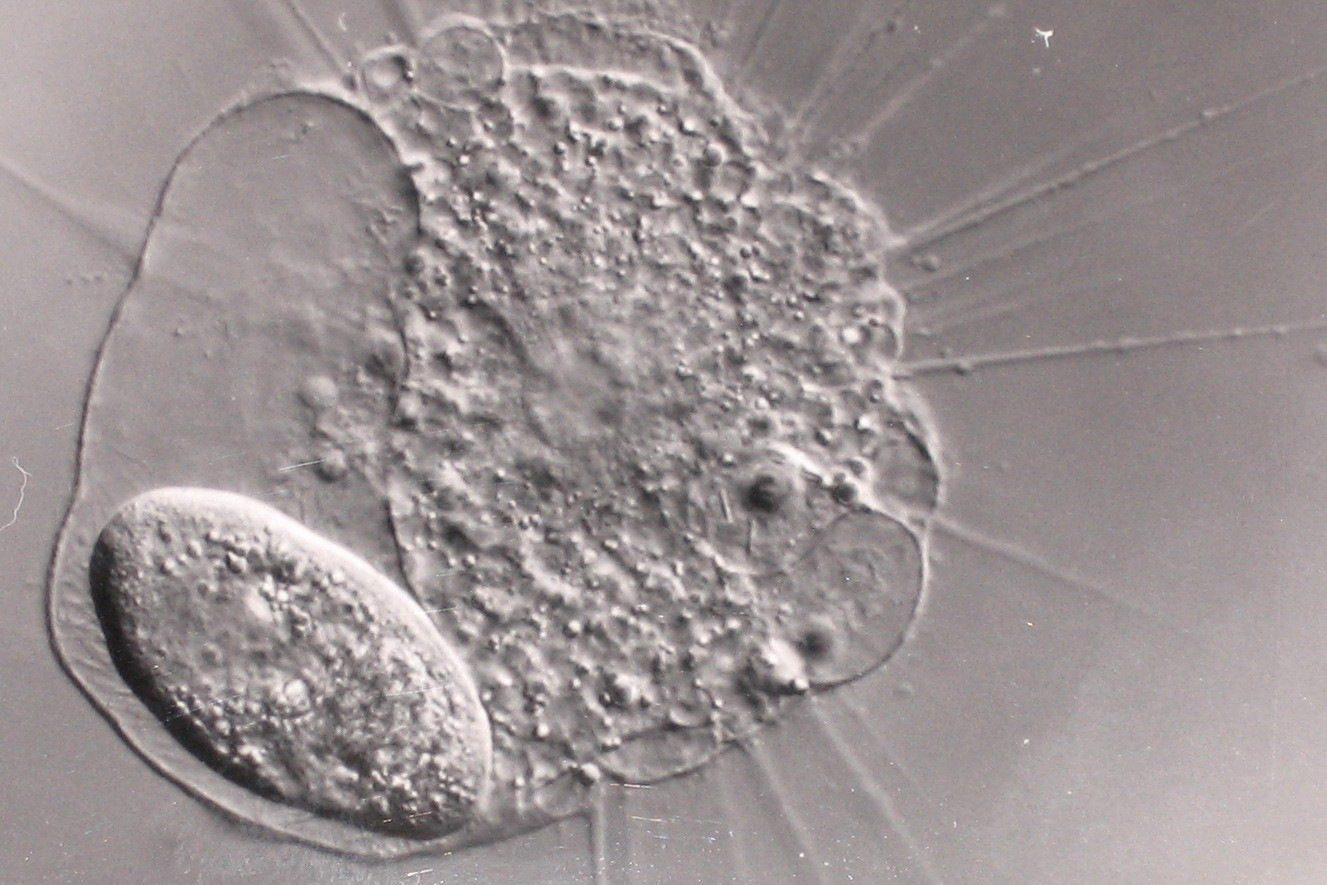
Actinophrys and Paramecium
