= List of Mallomonas species =

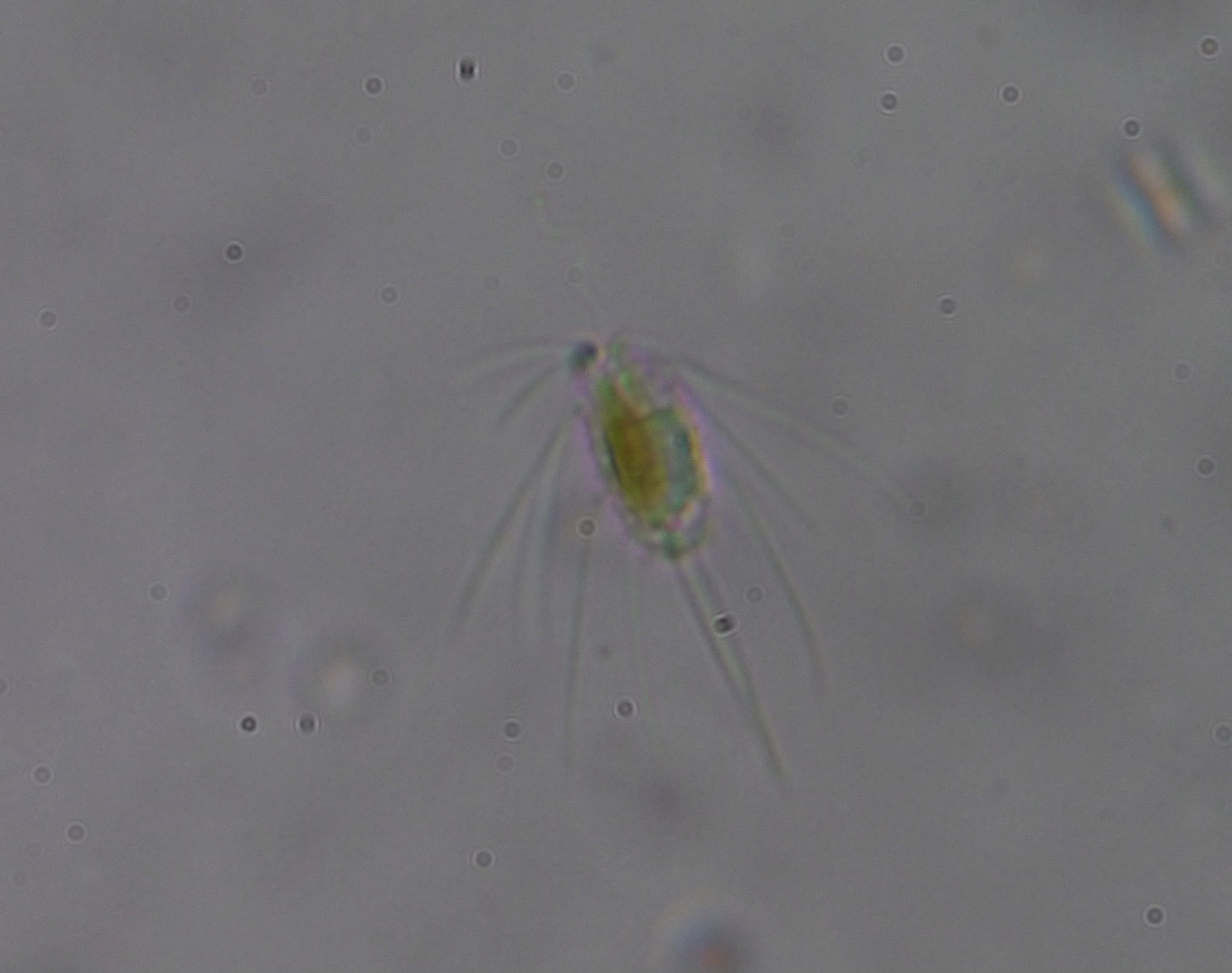
Mallomonas sp.

The algae genus Mallomonas contains the following species, forms, and varieties:

== A ==
- Mallomonas acaroides Zacharias
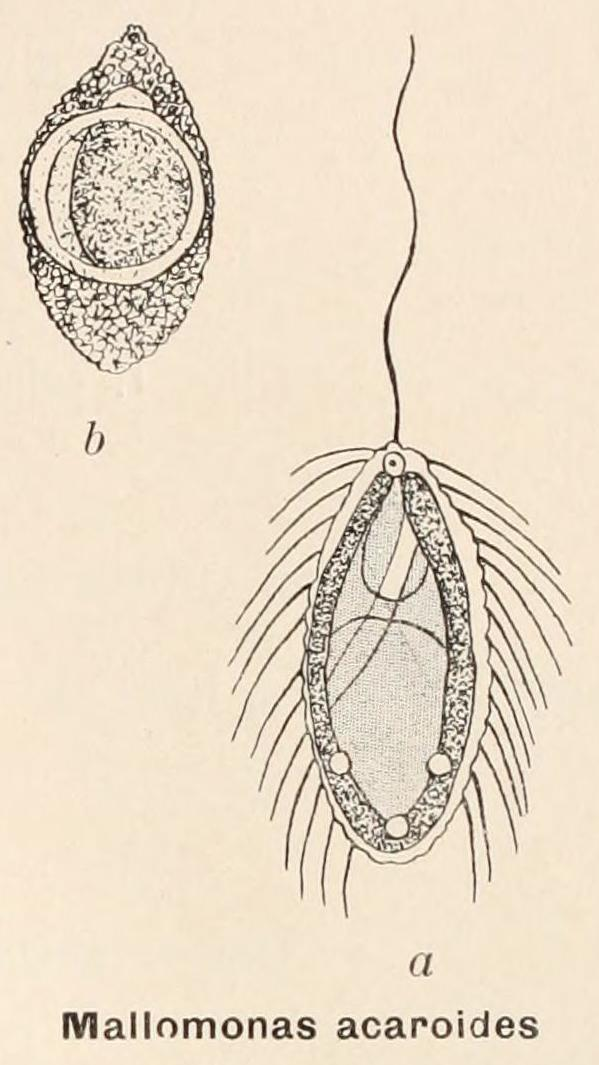
  Mallomonas acaroides
- Mallomonas actinoloma E.Takahashi
  - Mallomonas actinoloma var. maramuresensis L.Péterfi & Momeu
  - Mallomonas actinoloma var. nadiensis Dürrschmidt
- Mallomonas aculeata Bachmann
- Mallomonas adamas K.Harris & D.E.Bradley
- Mallomonas aerolata Nygaard
- Mallomonas akrokomos Ruttner
- Mallomonas alata Asmund, Cronberg & Dürrschmidt
  - Mallomonas alata f. hualvensis Asmund, Cronberg & Dürrschmidt
- Mallomonas allorgei (Deflandre) W.Conrad
- Mallomonas alpestrina Němcová & Zeisek
- Mallomonas alphaphora Preisig
- Mallomonas alpina Pascher & Ruttner
- Mallomonas alveolata Dürrschmidt
- Mallomonas amazonica Vigna, S.R.Duque & Múñez-Avellaneda
- Mallomonas americana Dürrschmidt
- Mallomonas ampla P.A.Siver & A.M.Lott
- Mallomonas anglica (N.Carter) Huber-Pestalozzi
- Mallomonas annulata (D.E.Bradley) K.Harris
- Mallomonas aperturae Siver
- Mallomonas apochromatica Conrad
- Mallomonas areolata Nygaard
- Mallomonas asmundiae (Wujek & van der Veer) Nicholls
- Mallomonas asymmetrica C.-X. Ma & Y.-X.Wei
- Mallomonas australica Playfair
  - Mallomonas australica var. gracillima Playfair
  - Mallomonas australica var. subglobosa Playfair

== B ==
- Mallomonas bacterium Conrad
- Mallomonas bangladeshica (E.Takahashi & T.Hayakawa) Siver & A.P.Wolfe
- Mallomonas baskettei P.A.Siver & A.M.Lott
- Mallomonas binocularis P.A.Siver
- Mallomonas bronchartiana Compère

== C ==
- Mallomonas caerula P.A.Siver
- Mallomonas calceolus D.E.Bradley
- Mallomonas camerunensis Piątek
- Mallomonas canina Kristiansen
- Mallomonas cattiensis E.S.Gusev, H.Doan-Nhu & L.Nguyen-Ngoc
- Mallomonas caudata Iwanoff
- Mallomonas ceylanica Dürrschmidt & G.Cronberg
- Mallomonas charkoviensis Kisselew
- Mallomonas clavata Conrad
- Mallomonas clavus D.E.Bradley
- Mallomonas connensis P.A.Siver & L.J.Marsicano
- Mallomonas conspersa Dürrschmidt
- Mallomonas convallis P.A.Siver & A.P.Wolfe
- Mallomonas corcontica (Kalina) L.Péterfi & Momeu
- Mallomonas coronata Bolochonzew
- Mallomonas coronifera Matvienko
- Mallomonas corymbosa Asmund
  - Mallomonas corymbosa var. interrupta M.S.Vigna & J.Kristiansen
  - Mallomonas corymbosa var. poseidonii P.A.Siver
- Mallomonas costata Dürrschmidt
- Mallomonas crassisquama (Asmund) Fott
  - Mallomonas crassisquama var. papillosa P.A.Siver & A.Skogstad
- Mallomonas cratis K.Harris & D.E.Bradley
- Mallomonas cristata Dürrschmidt
- Mallomonas crocodilorum P.Hansen
- Mallomonas cronbergiae Piątek
- Mallomonas cucullata S.Barreto
- Mallomonas cyathellata Wujek & Asmund
  - Mallomonas cyathellata var. chilensis Dürrschmidt
  - Mallomonas cyathellata var. kenyana Wujek & Asmund
- Mallomonas cylindracea Pascher

== D ==
- Mallomonas delanciana P.A.Siver
- Mallomonas denticulata Matvienko
- Mallomonas dickii K.H.Nicholls
- Mallomonas directa Nemková et al.
- Mallomonas dispar Siver, Lott & Wolfe
- Mallomonas distinguenda Gusev et al.
- Mallomonas divida Němcová & J. Kreidlová
- Mallomonas doignonii Bourrelly
  - Mallomonas doignonii var. robusticostis K.H.Nicholls
  - Mallomonas doignonii var. tenuicostis Asmund & Cronberg
- Mallomonas duerrschmidtiae P.A.Siver, J.S.Hamer & H.J.Kling

== E ==
- Mallomonas elegans Lemmermann
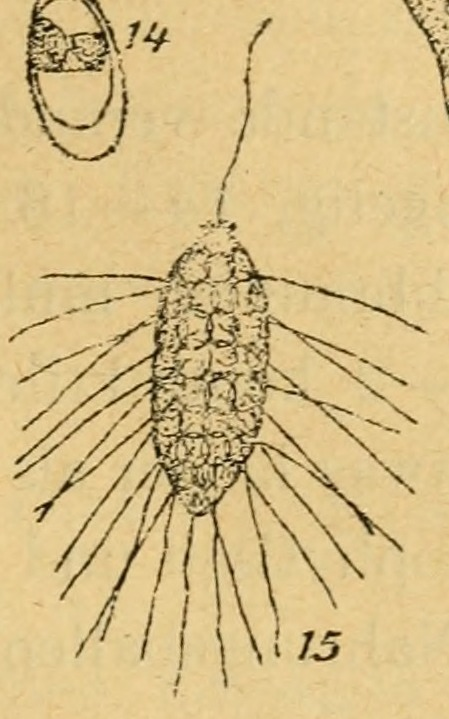
  Mallomonas elegans
- Mallomonas elephantus P.A.Siver & A.P.Wolfe
- Mallomonas elliptica (Kisselev) W.Conrad
- Mallomonas elongata Reverdin
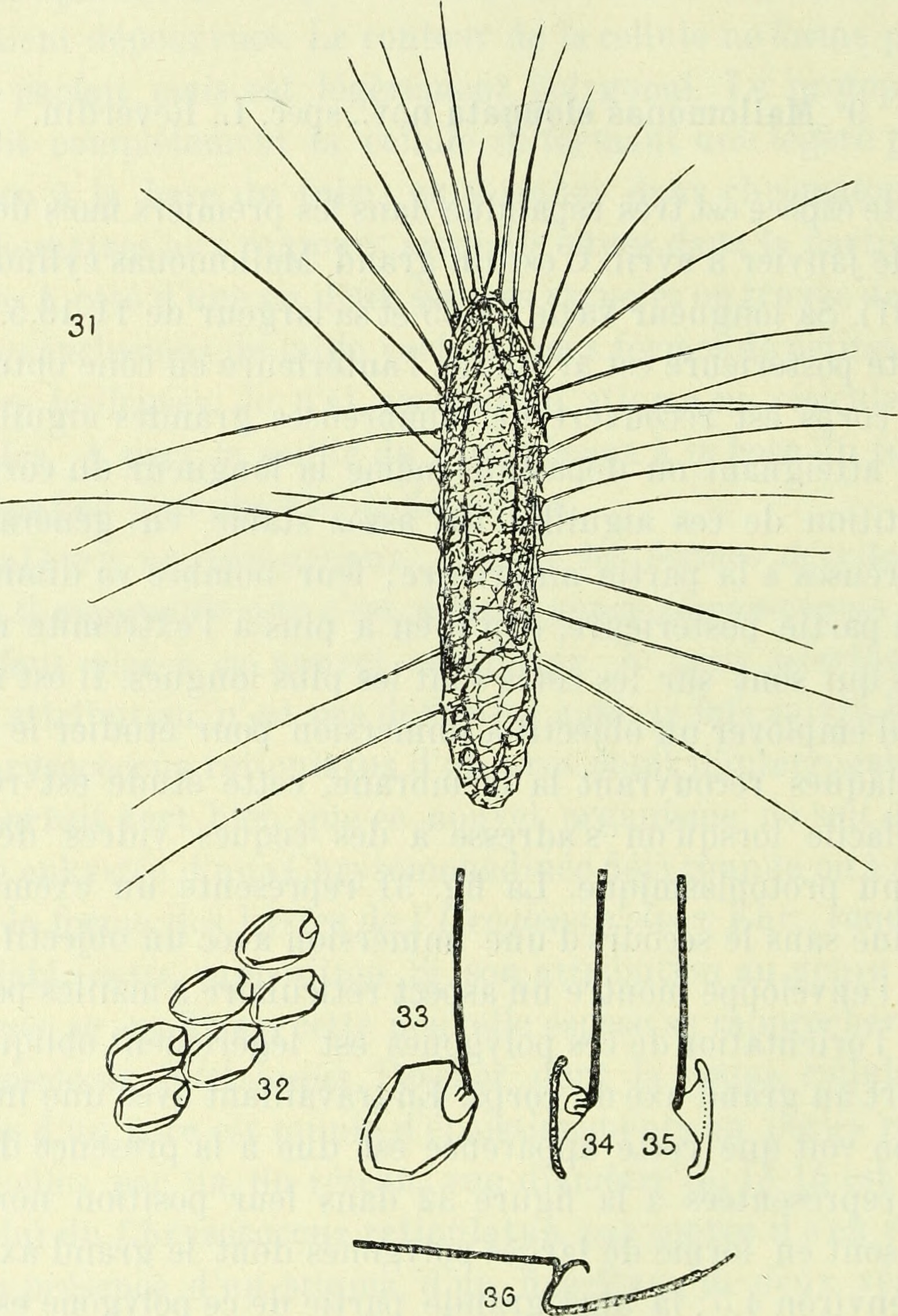
  Mallomonas elongata
  - Mallomonas elongata var. americana Bourrelly
- Mallomonas eoa E.Takahashi
- Mallomonas epithallatia Droop

== F ==
- Mallomonas favosa K.H.Nicholls
  - Mallomonas favosa f. gemina Dürrschmidt & Croome
- Mallomonas fenestrata Cronbeg & B.Hickel
- Mallomonas fimbriata E.S.Gusev
- Mallomonas flora K.Harris & D.E.Bradley
  - Mallomonas flora var. palermii Vigna
- Mallomonas formosa S.Barreto
- Mallomonas fresenii Kent
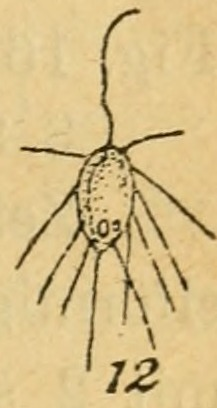
  Mallomonas fresenii
- Mallomonas fuegiana Vigna & Kristiansen
- Mallomonas furtiva Gusev, Certnerová, Škaloudová & Škaloud
- Mallomonas fusiformis Wermel

== G ==
- Mallomonas galeiformis K.H.Nicholls
- Mallomonas giraffensis P.A.Siver & A.P.Wolfe
- Mallomonas glabra N.Woodhead & R.D.Tweed
- Mallomonas globosa Schiller
- Mallomonas grata E.Takahashi
- Mallomonas grossa Dürrschmidt
- Mallomonas guttata Wujek
  - Mallomonas guttata var. simplex K.H.Nicholls

== H ==
- Mallomonas hamata Asmund
- Mallomonas harrisiae E.Takahashi
- Mallomonas heimii Bourrelly
- Mallomonas helvetica Pascher
- Mallomonas heterospina J.W.G.Lund
  - Mallomonas heterospina f. calida Vigna
  - Mallomonas heterospina var. ornata Bourrelly
- Mallomonas heverlensis (Conrad) Conrad
- Mallomonas hexagonis K.H.Nicholls
- Mallomonas hexareticulata B.Y.Jo, W.Shin, H.S.Kim, P.A.Siver & R.A.Andersen
- Mallomonas hindonii K.H.Nicholls
- Mallomonas hirsuta Conrad

== I ==
- Mallomonas inornata K.H.Nicholls
- Mallomonas insignis Penard
  - Mallomonas insignis var. lacustris Bourrelly
- Mallomonas intermedia Kisselew/Kisselev
  - Mallomonas intermedia var. salicaensis Péterfi & Momeu

== J ==
- Mallomonas jejuensis H.S.Kim & J.H.Kim
- Mallomonas jubata Nemková et al.

== K ==
- Mallomonas kalinae Rezácova
- Mallomonas koreana H.S.Kim & J.H.Kim
- Mallomonas kristiansenii Wujek & C.M.Bicudo
- Mallomonas kuzminii E.S.Gusev & M.S.Kulikovskiy

== L ==
- Mallomonas labyrinthina K.H.Nicholls
- Mallomonas lacuna B.Y.Jo, W.Shin, H.S.Kim, P.A.Siver & R.A.Andersen
- Mallomonas lanalhuensis Dürrschmidt
- Mallomonas lancea Siver, Lott & Wolfe
- Mallomonas leboimei Bourrelly
- Mallomonas lefeuvrei Villeret
- Mallomonas lefevriana Bourrelly
- Mallomonas lelymene K.Harris & D.E.Bradley
- Mallomonas lemuriocellata P.Hansen
- Mallomonas lilloënsis Conrad
- Mallomonas limnicola J.W.G.Lund
- Mallomonas litomesa A.Stokes
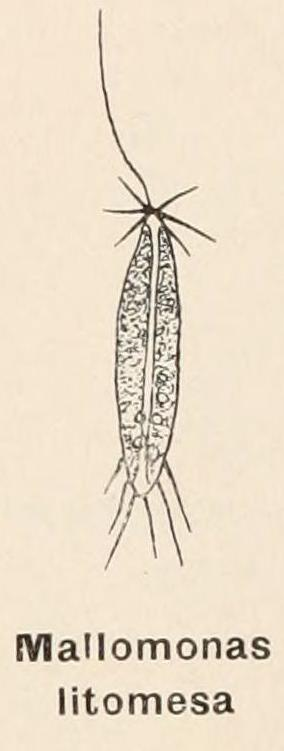
  Mallomonas litomesa
  - Mallomonas litomesa var. curta Playfair
- Mallomonas liturata K.H.Nicholls
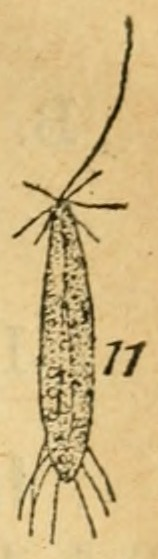
  Mallomonas litomesa
- Mallomonas longiseta (Lemmermann) Lemmermann
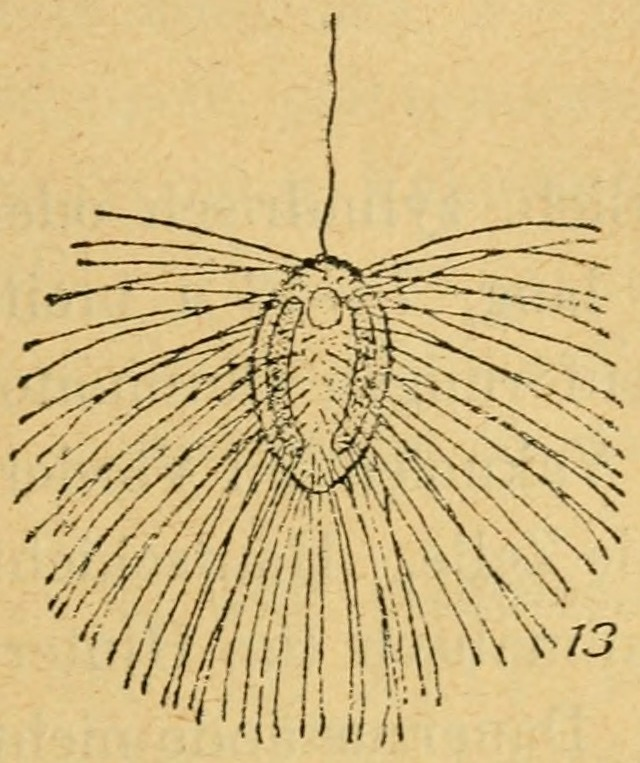
  Mallomonas longiseta
- Mallomonas lychenensis W.Conrad
  - Mallomonas lychenensis f. ecuadorensis Wujek & Dziedzik
  - Mallomonas lychenensis f. symposiaca Skogstad & Kristiansen

== M ==
- Mallomonas maculata D.E.Bradley
- Mallomonas madagascarensis P.Hansen
- Mallomonas majorensis Skuja
- Mallomonas mangofera K.Harris & D.E.Bradley
  - Mallomonas mangofera var. foveata (Dürrschmidt) Kristiansen
  - Mallomonas mangofera var. gracilis (Dürrschmidt) Kristiansen
  - Mallomonas mangofera var. reticulata (Cronberg) Kristiansen
  - Mallomonas mangofera var. sulcata Dürrschmidt
- Mallomonas marsupialis R.Croome, J.Kristiansen & P.A.Tyler
- Mallomonas matvienkoae B.Asmund & Kristiansen
  - Mallomonas matvienkoae f. litteata Dürrschmidt ex B.Asmund & J.Kristiansen
  - Mallomonas matvienkoae var. grandis Dürrschmidt & G.Cronberg
  - Mallomonas matvienkoae var. myakkana P.A.Siver
  - Mallomonas matvienkoae var. siveri Wujek & L.C.Saha
- Mallomonas media P.A.Siver & A.M.Lott
- Mallomonas minima L.Rehfous
- Mallomonas mirabilis Conrad
- Mallomonas monograptus K.Harris & D.E.Bradley
- Mallomonas morrisonensis Croome & P.A.Tyler
- Mallomonas moskowensis Wermel
- Mallomonas multisetigera Dürrschmidt
- Mallomonas multiunca Asmund
  - Mallomonas multiunca var. pocosinensis P.A.Siver
- Mallomonas munda (Asmund, Cronberg & Dürrschmidt) Nemková
- Mallomonas muskokana (K.H.Nicholls) P.A.Siver

== N ==
- Mallomonas neoampla E.Gusev & P.A.Siver
- Mallomonas newfoundlandicus P.A. Siver
- Mallomonas nieringii P.A.Siver
- Mallomonas nuussuaqensis L.R.Wilken & J.Kristiansen

== O ==
- Mallomonas ocalensis P.A.Siver
- Mallomonas ocellata Dürrschmidt & Croome
- Mallomonas ouradion K.Harris & D.E.Bradley
- Mallomonas oviformis Nygaard

== P ==
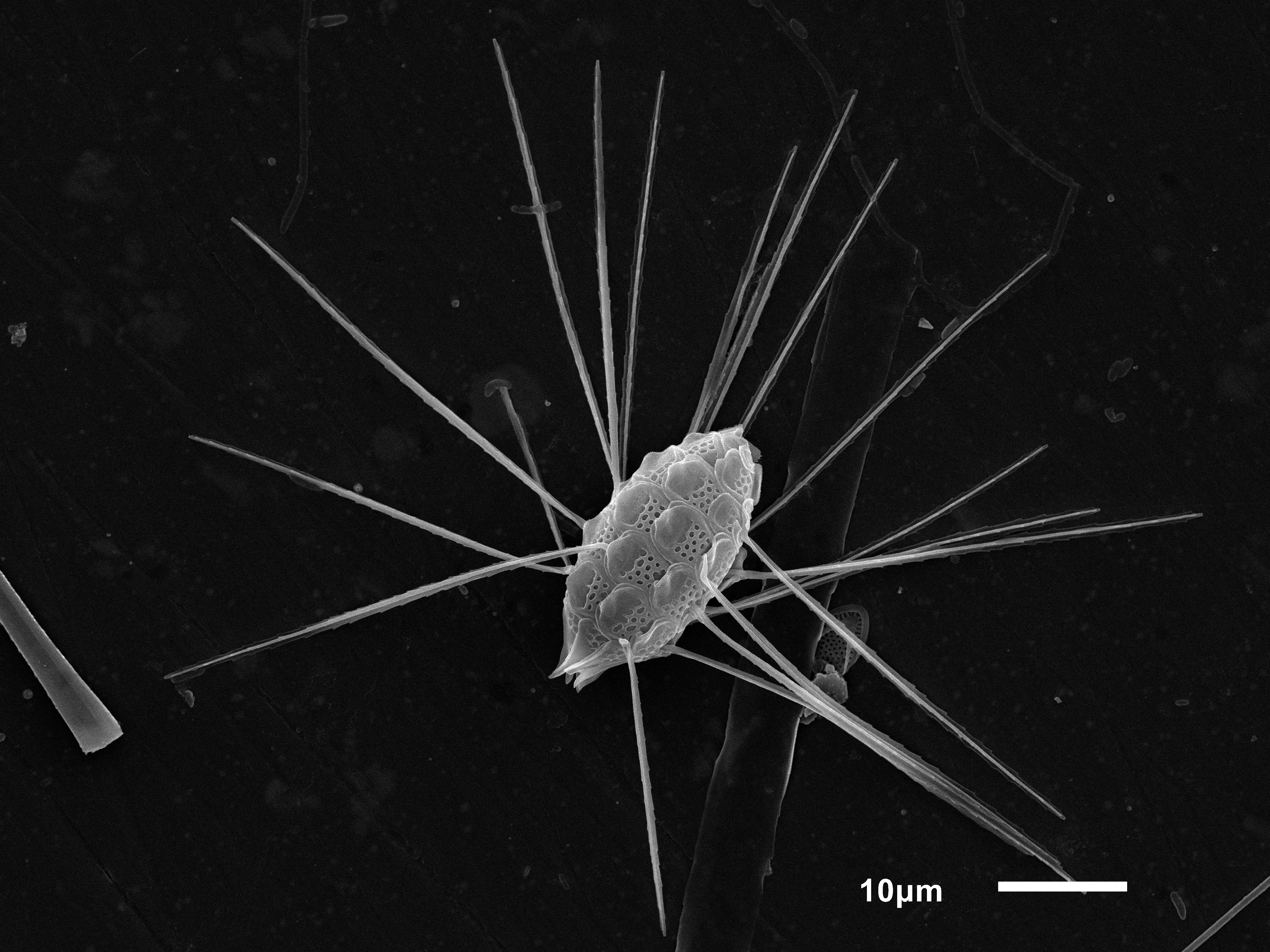
Mallomonas punctifera

- Mallomonas padulosa Fott
- Mallomonas palaestrica P.Hansen, J.E.Johansen & A.Skovgaard
- Mallomonas paludosa Fott
- Mallomonas papillosa K.Harris & D.E.Bradley
  - Mallomonas papillosa var. ellipsoidea K.Harris
  - Mallomonas papillosa var. monilifera K.Harris
- Mallomonas paragrandis Gusev
- Mallomonas parana Vigna & Kristiansen
- Mallomonas parisiae Bourrelly
- Mallomonas parvula Dürrschmidt
  - Mallomonas parvula var. nichollsii Wujek & R.G.Bland
- Mallomonas paxillata (D.E.Bradley) L.S.Péterfi & Momeu
- Mallomonas pechlaneri Němcová & Rott
- Mallomonas perfossa K.H.Nicholls
- Mallomonas peroneides (K.Harris) Momeu & L.S.Péterfi
- Mallomonas perpusilla Dürrschmidt
- Mallomonas phasma K.Harris & D.E.Bradley
- Mallomonas pillula K.Harris
  - Mallomonas pillula f. exannulata K.Harris
  - Mallomonas pillula f. labyrinthopsis Wujek
  - Mallomonas pillula var. latimorginalis Dürrschmidt
  - Mallomonas pillula var. valdiviana Dürrschmidt
- Mallomonas plantefolii Bourrelly
- Mallomonas pleuriforamen P.A.Siver, Lott, B.Y.Jo, W.Shin, H.S.Kim & R.A.Andersen
- Mallomonas ploesslii Perty - Type species
- Mallomonas plumosa Croome & P.A.Tyler
- Mallomonas porifera P.A.Siver & A.P.Wolfe
- Mallomonas portae-ferreae L.Péterfi & Asmund
  - Mallomonas portae-ferreae var. reticulata Gretz, Sommerfeld & Wujek
- Mallomonas preisigii P.A.Siver
- Mallomonas producta Iwanhoff
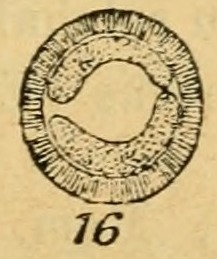
  Mallomonas producta
  - Mallomonas producta var. marchica Lemmermann
- Mallomonas prora Dürrschmidt
- Mallomonas pseudobronchartiana E.S.Gusev, P.A. Siver & W.Shin
- Mallomonas pseudocaudata P.A.Siver & A.P.Wolfe
- Mallomonas pseudocoronata Prescott
- Mallomonas pseudocratis Dürrschmidt
- Mallomonas pseudohamata P.A.Siver & A.P.Wolfe
- Mallomonas pseudomatvienkoae B.Y.Jo, W.Shin, H.S.Kim, P.A.Siver & R.A.Andersen
- Mallomonas pseudotonsurata Bourrelly
- Mallomonas pugio D.E.Bradley
- Mallomonas pulcherrima (Stokes) Lemmermann
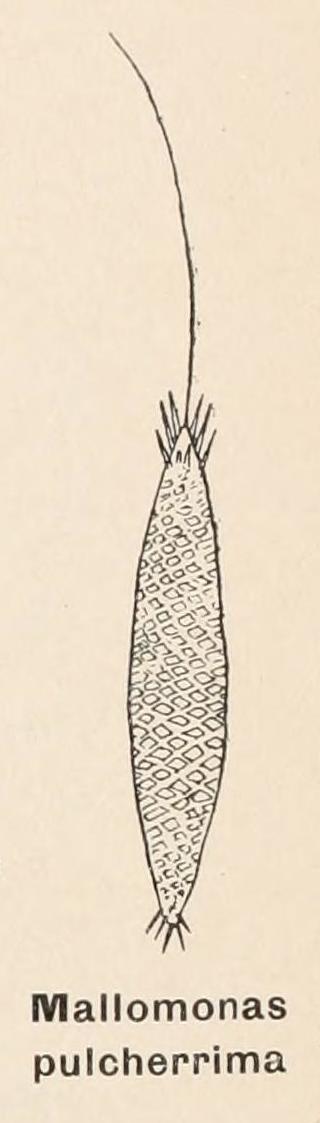
  Mallomonas pulcherrima
- Mallomonas pulchra Conrad
- Mallomonas pumilio K.Harris & D.E.Bradley
  - Mallomonas pumilio var. dispersa Nemková et al.
  - Mallomonas pumilio f. munda Asmund, Cronberg & Dürrschmidt
- Mallomonas punctifera Korshikov
  - Mallomonas punctifera var. brasiliensis J.Kristiansen & M.Menezes

== R ==
- Mallomonas radiata Conrad
- Mallomonas rasilis Dürrschmidt
- Mallomonas recticostata E.Takahashi
- Mallomonas reeuwlijkiana W.Conrad
- Mallomonas retifera Dürrschmidt
- Mallomonas retrorsa P.A.Siver
- Mallomonas rhombica G.Cronberg
- Mallomonas roscida Dürrschmidt

== S ==
- Mallomonas sabulosa Croome & P.A.Tyler
- Mallomonas salina W.Conrad
- Mallomonas scalaris Dürrschmidt
- Mallomonas schumachii P.A.Siver
- Mallomonas schwemmlei Glenk
- Mallomonas scrobiculata K.H.Nicholls
- Mallomonas serrata Nicholls
- Mallomonas sexangularis K.H.Nicholls
- Mallomonas silvicola (Harris & D.E.Bradley) Nemková
- Mallomonas skvortsovii Gusev et al.
- Mallomonas sonfonensis N.Woodhead & R.D.Tweed
- Mallomonas sophiae Czosnowski
- Mallomonas sorohexareticulata B.Y.Jo, W.Shin, H.S.Kim, P.A.Siver & R.A.Andersen
- Mallomonas sphagniphila K.H.Nicholls
- Mallomonas spinifera Schiller
- Mallomonas spinosa E.S.Gusev
- Mallomonas spinulosa Conrad
- Mallomonas splendens (G.S.West) Playfair
  - Mallomonas splendens f. arnhemensis Croome, Dürrschmidt & P.A.Tyler
  - Mallomonas splendens var. biceps W.Conrad
  - Mallomonas splendens var. pusilla Playfair
- Mallomonas stellata G.Cronberg
- Mallomonas striata Asmund
  - Mallomonas striata var. balonovii Voloshko
  - Mallomonas striata var. getseniae Voloshko
  - Mallomonas striata var. serrata K.Harris & D.E.Bradley
- Mallomonas strictopteris Péterfi & Momeu
- Mallomonas subsalina Conrad & Kufferath

== T ==
- Mallomonas tasmanica (Croome & P.A.Tyler) Asmund & Kristiansen
- Mallomonas teilingii W.Conrad
- Mallomonas temonis Němcová
- Mallomonas tenuis Conrad
- Mallomonas tirolensis Pichrtová et al.
- Mallomonas tolerans Asmund & J.Kristiansen
- Mallomonas tongarirensis Dürrschmidt
- Mallomonas tonsurata Teiling
  - Mallomonas tonsurata var. coroniferoides K.H.Nicholls
  - Mallomonas tonsurata var. etortisetifera X.Zhang, I.Inouye & M.Chihara
- Mallomonas torquata B.Asmund & G.Cronberg
  - Mallomonas torquata var. simplex (K.H.Nicholls) Kristiansen
- Mallomonas torulosa Kisselev
- Mallomonas transsylvanica L.S.Péterfi & Momeu
- Mallomonas trichophora Bourrelly
- Mallomonas tropica Dürrschmidt & Croome
- Mallomonas trummensis Cronberg
- Mallomonas tubulosa S.Barreto

== U ==
- Mallomonas urnaformis Prescott

== V ==
- Mallomonas valkanoviana Conrad
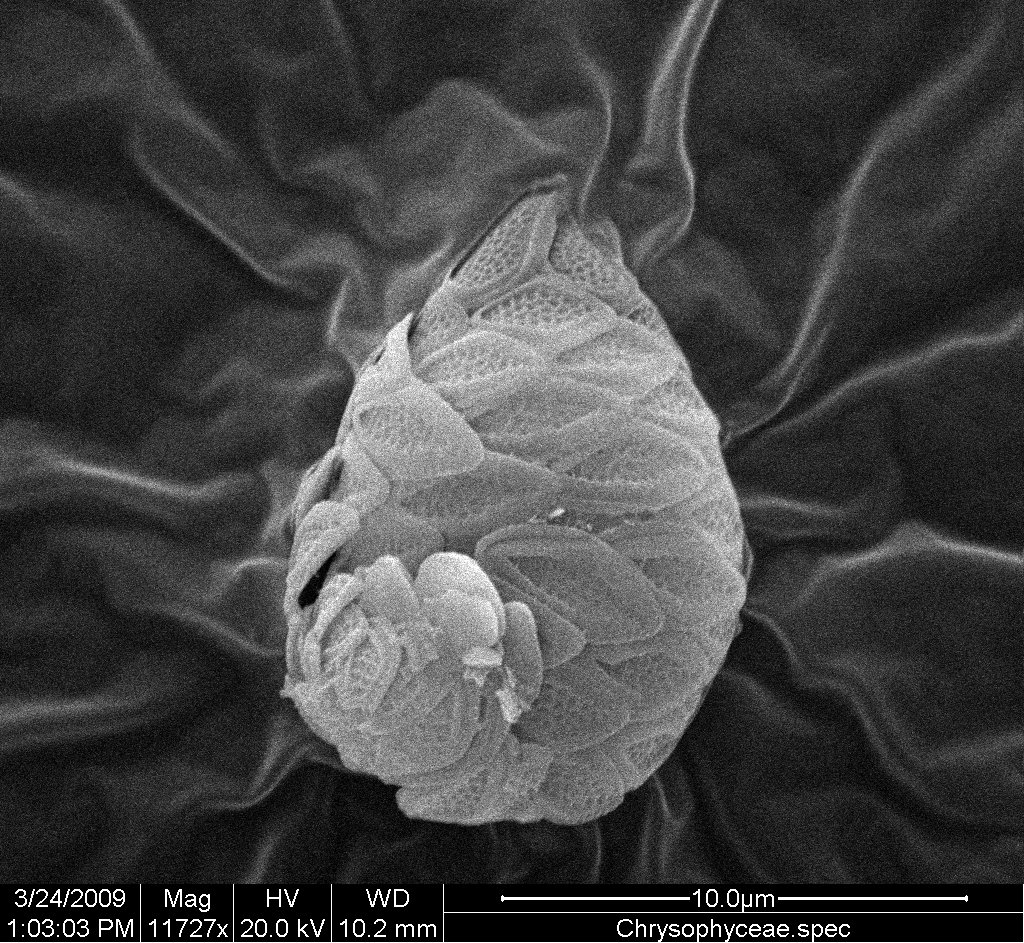
  Mallomonas valkanoviana
- Mallomonas vannigera Asmund
  - Mallomonas vannigera var. parallelicosta Balonov
- Mallomonas variabilis G.Cronberg
- Mallomonas velari E.S.Gusev, P.A. Siver & W.Shin
- Mallomonas verrucosa Vigna
- Mallomonas villosa Dürrschmidt
- Mallomonas vorkutiensis Voloshko

== W ==
- Mallomonas weei D.E.Wujek, E.M.Wright & G.L.Williams
- Mallomonas wujekii P.A.Siver

== Z ==
- Mallomonas zellensis Fott
