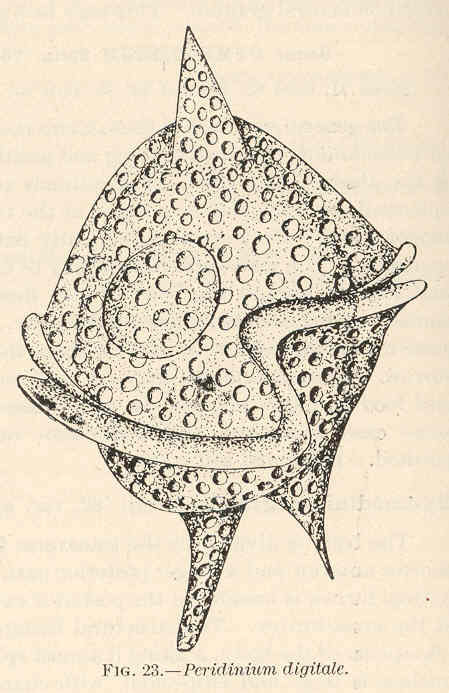
- Peridinium digitale

Scientific classification
- Domain: Eukaryota
- Clade: Sar
- Clade: Alveolata
- Division: Dinoflagellata
- Class: Dinophyceae
- Order: Peridiniales
- Family: Peridiniaceae
- Genus: Peridinium; Ehrenberg

Type species
- Peridinium cinctum O.F.Müller Ehrenberg

Species
- See text

= Peridinium =

Genus of single-celled organisms

Peridinium is a genus of motile, marine and freshwater dinoflagellates. Their morphology is considered typical of the armoured dinoflagellates, and their form is commonly used in diagrams of a dinoflagellate's structure. Peridinium can range from 30 to 70 μm in diameter, and has very thick thecal plates.

== Morphology ==
Peridinium is enclosed by cellulose theca and with two flagellates. The composition of the theca is laminaribiose and laminaritriose linking by β – 1, 4 and β – 1, 3 linkages. The cell body of Peridinium is highly polarized and is distinguishable from apical and antapical sides or dorsal and ventral sides. Their theca is divided into epicone and hypocone by the middle region (also called girdle or cingulum). The flagellates have two different directions, one is surrounding the middle region while the other are in the longitudinal groove of hypocone. The chloroplast in Peridinium is triple membrane, and some plastid-derived organelles like pyrenoid or eyespot also. This provides the evidence that these organelles originated from secondary endosymbiosis. The inner membrane of mitochondrion is tubular. Trichocyst is a specialized organelle in dinoflagellate which help them defense to predators.

== Life cycle ==
Peridinium is a haplontic algae. Most time of Peridinium are haploid vegetative cells and undergoing asexual or sexual cycle. They only form zygote before dormancy.

In asexual cycle, the haploid vegetative cell throws the theca before mitosis and produces two daughter cells by mitosis. During mitosis, the chromosome in their nucleus condenses but the nucleus of endosymbiont doesn’t. After the cleavage furrow starts to separate their nucleus, the nucleus of endosymbiont then passes through the gaps between cleavage furrow and their nucleus. Then the nucleus of endosymbiont was divided by cleavage furrow together.

In sexual cycle, they produce gametes as isogamete and the gametes fuse to form planozygotes to get dormancy. After dormancy, the zygote starts to undergo meiosis. The first meiosis produces a two diploid nuclei cell without cytokinesis. An asynchronized nucleus division then occurs in one of the two nuclei. One nucleus undergoing second meiosis before cytokinesis in first meiosis and turns into a trinucleate stage. After it, the cytokinesis of first meiosis is completed, and the trinucleate cell is divided into a diploid nucleus cell and a double haploid nuclei cell. When the cytokinesis of second meiosis is completed, finally, it produces four haploid daughter cells.

Overall, Peridinium dominants in mobile haploid generation. Between spring and summer, the haploid venerative cells produce gametes by mitosis and fuse gametes into a diploid planozygote. The diploid planozygotes then transform into immobile hypnozygotes and deposit to get dormancy in winter. After a year, the hypnozygotes germinate in spring and release haploid vegetative cells.

== Ecology ==
Peridinium gatunense blooms in the Lake Kinneret in Israel which changing the color of the lake is discovered in 1960. The blooming event occurs because the organic mineral is flushed into the sea every year in spring. Organic mineral nourishes the diatom and increases their population. Thus, the planozygotes of Peridinium break dormancy and release thousands of vegetative cells into the sea by feeding on diatom. From 1960 to 1996, the annual pattern was regularly peaked at spring in each year. But starting from 1996, the blooming was broken. The break of blooming is related to high temperature, other phytoplanktonic competitor (Chytrid or Microcystis), and human activities in the aquatic system by managing the water flow of the river.

== Species ==
Species include:

- Peridinium abscissum O.Zacharias
- Peridinium achromaticum Levander
- Peridinium acutangulum Lemmermann Lemmermann
- Peridinium acutum G.Karsten
- Peridinium adriaticum H.Broch
- Peridinium aequalis W.S.Kent
- Peridinium allorgei Lefèvre
- Peridinium ampulliforme E.J.F.Wood
- Peridinium andrzejowskii Woloszynska
- Peridinium annulatum C.A.Kofoid & J.R.Michener
- Peridinium anserinum Baumeister
- Peridinium aspinum A.F.Meunier
- Peridinium assymmetricum L.A.Mangin C.E.H.Ostenfeld
- Peridinium asymmetrica T.H.Abé
- Peridinium asymmetricum G.Karsten
- Peridinium baliense E.R.Lindemann
- Peridinium basilium W.S.Drugg
- Peridinium belgicum A.Wulff
- Peridinium bicorne L.K.Schmarda
- Peridinium bidens Lemmermann
- Peridinium bimucronatum J.Schiller
- Peridinium bipes Stein
- Peridinium brasiliense G.Borics & I.Grigorszky
- Peridinium callosum E.H.Jörgensen
- Peridinium carinatum Ehrenberg
- Peridinium caspicum C.E.H.Ostenfeld Lemmermann
- Peridinium castaneiforme L.A.Mangin
- Peridinium cavispinum L.A.Mangin
- Peridinium centenniale Playfair M.Lefèvre
- Peridinium chattoni B.Biecheler
- Peridinium chattonii Biecheler
- Peridinium chilophaenum Ehrenberg
- Peridinium chinense J.Schiller
- Peridinium cinctum O.F.Müller Ehrenberg - type
- Peridinium comatum P.Morgenroth
- Peridinium complanatum A.F.Meunier
- Peridinium complanatum G.Karsten
- Peridinium corniculum Kofoid & Michener
- Peridinium crassipyrum Balech
- Peridinium cucumis G.H.Wailes
- Peridinium cuneatum A.C.J.Goor
- Peridinium cypripedium H.J.Clark
- Peridinium cystiferum Pavillard
- Peridinium dakariensis P.A.Dangeard
- Peridinium dalei Indel.& Loeblich Balech
- Peridinium deficiens A.F.Meunier
- Peridinium delitiense Ehrenberg
- Peridinium dentatum V.Hensen
- Peridinium diamantum D.M.Churchill & W.A.S.Sarjeant
- Peridinium digitale C.-H.-G.Pouchet Lemmermann
- Peridinium diplopsalioides A.Henckel
- Peridinium disciforme A.Cleve
- Peridinium ellipsoideum L.A.Mangin
- Peridinium ellipsoideum P.A.Dangeard
- Peridinium eocenicum I.C.Cookson & A.Eisenack
- Peridinium excavatum G.W.Martin
- Peridinium exiguipes L.A.Mangin
- Peridinium exiguum P.T.Cleve
- Peridinium formosum Pavillard
- Peridinium galeatum V.Hensen
- Peridinium garderae Balech
- Peridinium gargantua Biecheler
- Peridinium gatunense Nygaard
- Peridinium geminum Playfair
- Peridinium gemma A.Cleve
- Peridinium globifera T.H.Abé
- Peridinium godlewskii Woloszynska
- Peridinium goslaviense Wolszynska
- Peridinium gracile Gran & Braarud
- Peridinium gracile Meunier
- Peridinium grani C.E.H.Ostenfeld
- Peridinium granisparsum A.F.Meunier
- Peridinium granulosum Playfair
- Peridinium gravidum A.F.Meunier
- Peridinium grenlandicum J.Woloszynska
- Peridinium gutwinskii Woloszynska
- Peridinium gymnodinium Pénard Entz
- Peridinium helix Balech
- Peridinium hemisphaericum T.H.Abé
- Peridinium herbaceum F.Schütt
- Peridinium heteracanthum P.A.Dangeard
- Peridinium hirobis T.H.Abé
- Peridinium horridissimum V.Hensen
- Peridinium horridum V.Hensen
- Peridinium huberi J.Schiller
- Peridinium hyalinum A.F.Meunier
- Peridinium hyalinum C.A.Kofoid & J.R.Michener
- Peridinium illustrans O.C.A.Wetzel
- Peridinium imperfectum G.A.Klebs
- Peridinium inaequale Fauré-Fremiet
- Peridinium inaequale N.Peters
- Peridinium inclinatum Balech
- Peridinium inconspicuum-contactum E.Lindemann F.Ruttner
- Peridinium inflatiforme A.Böhm
- Peridinium intermedium A.Candeias
- Peridinium intermedium Playfair Playfair
- Peridinium jensenii Nygaard Nygaard
- Peridinium jenzschii Ehrenberg
- Peridinium kansanum P.Tasch
- Peridinium karianum A.F.Meunier J.Schiller
- Peridinium karianum A.Henckel
- Peridinium karstenii Kofoid & Michener
- Peridinium keyense Nygaard
- Peridinium knipowitzschii Ussatschew
- Peridinium kofoidii Fauré-Fremiet
- Peridinium koma T.H.Abé
- Peridinium lambdoideum E.Nagy
- Peridinium laticeps J.Gröntved & G.Seidenfaden
- Peridinium latipyrum Balech
- Peridinium lenticulare E.H.Jörgensen
- Peridinium lenticulatum Fauré-Fremiet
- Peridinium levanderi T.H.Abé
- Peridinium limbatum Stokes Lemmermann
- Peridinium lingii Thomasson
- Peridinium lithanthracis Ehrenberg Ehrenberg
- Peridinium loeblichii E.R.Cox & H.J.Arnott Dale
- Peridinium longicollum Pavillard
- Peridinium longirostrum A.Cleve
- Peridinium longispinum L.A.Mangin
- Peridinium lucina Ehrenberg
- Peridinium macrapicatum Balech
- Peridinium macrospinum L.A.Mangin
- Peridinium majus P.A.Dangeard P.A.Dangeard
- Peridinium manginii Ostenfeld
- Peridinium marinum E.Lindemann
- Peridinium matzenaueri K.R.Gaarder
- Peridinium melaphyri Jenzsch Ehrenberg
- Peridinium meunieri N.Peters
- Peridinium micrapium A.F.Meunier
- Peridinium minsculum Pavillard
- Peridinium minus L.A.Mangin
- Peridinium minus O.W.Paulsen O.W.Paulsen
- Peridinium minusculum Pavillard
- Peridinium minutissimum L.A.Mangin
- Peridinium mixtum Woloszynska
- Peridinium monacanthum Broch Balech
- Peridinium monoceros V.Hensen
- Peridinium morzinense Lefèvre
- Peridinium multipunctatum Fauré-Fremiet
- Peridinium mutsui J.Schiller
- Peridinium nanum Balech
- Peridinium nasutum L.A.Mangin
- Peridinium neglectum V.Hensen)
- Peridinium nivale A.F.Meunier J.Schiller
- Peridinium nodulosum C.A.Kofoid & J.R.Michener
- Peridinium norpacense Balech
- Peridinium novum Chodat
- Peridinium novum V.Hensen
- Peridinium nux J.Schiller
- Peridinium oamaruense Deflandre Schiller
- Peridinium obesum Matzenauer
- Peridinium obliquiforme J.Schiller
- Peridinium obliquum L.A.Mangin
- Peridinium obliquum P.A.Dangeard
- Peridinium obtusipes L.A.Mangin
- Peridinium oculatum Dujardin
- Peridinium oculatum F.Stein J.Woloszynska
- Peridinium okamurae T.H.Abé
- Peridinium ovale V.Hensen
- Peridinium pacificum Kofoid & Michener
- Peridinium paleocenicum I.C.Cookson & A.Eisenack
- Peridinium parainerme D.S.Nie & C.C.Wang
- Peridinium parallelum Brock
- Peridinium parapentagonum Wang
- Peridinium parapyriforme J.Hermosilla
- Peridinium peisonis J.Schiller
- Peridinium perbreve Balech & S.O.Soares
- Peridinium perhorridum V.Hensen
- Peridinium perminutum A.Cleve
- Peridinium perrieri Fauré-Fremiet
- Peridinium persicum J.Schiller
- Peridinium petersi Balech
- Peridinium pietschmanni A.Böhm
- Peridinium pilula Ostenfeld Lemmermann
- Peridinium planulum J.A.M.Perty
- Peridinium playfairi E.Lindemann
- Peridinium playfairii E.R.Lindemann
- Peridinium pleum P.Tasch
- Peridinium polymorphum E.Lindemann
- Peridinium ponticum D.Wall & B.Dale
- Peridinium porosum V.Hensen
- Peridinium pouchetii Kofoid & Michener
- Peridinium priscum Ehrenberg
- Peridinium privum O.E.Imhof
- Peridinium pseudo-intermedium Couté & A.Iltis
- Peridinium pseudo-laeve M.Lefèvre
- Peridinium pseudoantarcticum Balech
- Peridinium pseudograni N.Peters
- Peridinium pseudonoctiluca C.-H.-G.Pouchet C.-H.-G.Pouchet
- Peridinium pseudopallidum N.Peters
- Peridinium pulchellum G.Karsten
- Peridinium pulchrum V.Hensen
- Peridinium quadricorne A.Henckel
- Peridinium quadridentatum F.Stein Gert Hansen
- Peridinium raciborskii Woloszynska
- Peridinium rampii Balech
- Peridinium resistente P.Morgenroth
- Peridinium rhombus A.F.Meunier
- Peridinium robustum A.F.Meunier
- Peridinium rubrum L.S.Cienkowski
- Peridinium saecularis G.Murray & F.G.Whitting C.E.H.Ostenfeld
- Peridinium scallense E.Lindemann
- Peridinium schilleri A.Böhm
- Peridinium schuettii Lemmermann G.Karsten
- Peridinium seebergi A.Henckel
- Peridinium sibiricum A.Henckel
- Peridinium simplex Gran & Braarud
- Peridinium smirnovii Skvortzov
- Peridinium sociale L.-F.Henneguy B.Biecheler
- Peridinium solidum A.Cleve
- Peridinium speciosum E.H.Jörgensen
- Peridinium sphaericum A.F.Meunier
- Peridinium sphaericum G.Murray & F.G.Whitting
- Peridinium sphaericum K.Okamura
- Peridinium spheroidea T.H.Abé
- Peridinium spheroides P.A.Dangeard
- Peridinium spinosum J.Schiller
- Peridinium spirale Gaarder Balech
- Peridinium striatum A.Böhm
- Peridinium striolatum Playfair
- Peridinium subtatranum Woloszynska
- Peridinium sydneyense Thomasson
- Peridinium symmetricum Halim
- Peridinium tabulatum Ehrenberg
- Peridinium tassellatum G.Karsten
- Peridinium tenuicorne L.A.Mangin
- Peridinium tenuissimum C.A.Kofoid
- Peridinium tetraceros v. Strampff
- Peridinium thuringiae Jenzsch Ehrenberg
- Peridinium toali A.Henckel
- Peridinium tomnickii J.Woloszynska
- Peridinium treubi J.Woloszynska
- Peridinium tricuspis O.C.A.Wetzel
- Peridinium tridens Ehrenberg
- Peridinium triqueta F.Stein Lebour
- Peridinium tristylum F.Stein
- Peridinium truncatum O.Zacharias
- Peridinium truncus T.H.Abé
- Peridinium tsingtaoense D.S.Nie & C.C.Wang
- Peridinium uberrimum G.J.Allman
- Peridinium uliginosum J.Schiller J.Woloszynska
- Peridinium umbo L.G.Sjöstedt
- Peridinium umbonatum Karsten
- Peridinium venter V.Hensen
- Peridinium ventricum T.H.Abé
- Peridinium ventriosum O.C.A.Wetzel
- Peridinium vexans G.Murray & F.G.Whitting
- Peridinium volkii Lemmermann
- Peridinium volzi Lemmermann
- Peridinium volzii Lemmermann
- Peridinium volzii Woloszynska
- Peridinium vorticella F.Stein
- Peridinium wiezejski Woloszynska
- Peridinium willei Huitfeldt-Kaas
- Peridinium witoslawii E.Lindemann
- Peridinium woloszynskae W.Conrad
- Peridinium yonedae Abé
