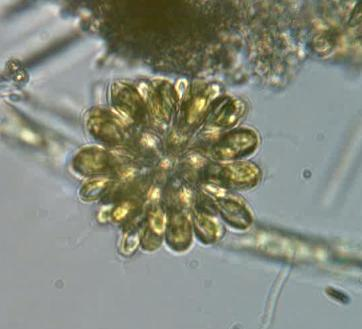
- A colony of Synura sp.

Scientific classification
- Domain: Eukaryota
- Supergroup: Stramenopiles
- Division: Ochrophyta
- Class: Chrysophyceae
- Order: Synurales
- Family: Synuraceae; Lemmermann, 1899 emend. B.Y. Jo, J.I. Kim, W. Shin, P.Škaloud & P. Siver, 2016
- Genus: Synura; Ehrenberg, 1834

Type species
- Synura uvella Ehrenberg

Species
- See text.

Synonyms
- Chrysodidymus Prowse

= Synura =

Genus of heterokont algae

Synura is a genus of colonial chrysomonad algae covered with silica scales. Synura is characterized by its heterokont flagella, and is the most conspicuous and diverse genus of the order Synurales.

== Description ==
Species of Synura form microscopic, spherical colonies, composed of multiple cells attached to each other at the center of the colony. Synura cells are variously shaped, typically spherical to pear-shaped or club-shaped. Each cell contains two plastids aligned with the long axis of the cell; they impart a distinctive golden color to the cells, which comes from chlorophyll c_{1} and fucoxanthin. Cells are covered with scales made of silica. Two flagella are present.

Identification of species depends on the morphology of the scales. For many species, a positive identification is only possible with an electron microscope, either with scanning electron microscopy (SEM) or transmission electron microscopy (TEM).

== Scales ==
Scales are one of the most distinctive features of Synura cells. They may serve as structural support, protect against grazing and parasitism from other protists and bacteria, and possibly enhance light diffraction into the cell interior, thus improving photosynthetic efficiency.

Silica plays a crucial role in the formation of Synura scales. In media with very low silica concentrations (<0.33 μM Si), scale formation is hindered, and culture growth slows. When silica becomes scarce, Synura cells produce weakly silicified scales and may ultimately fail to produce scales. In contrast to diatoms—whose frustule formation and survival depend on silica—Synura needs silica for building scales but can survive even without it.

Phenotypic plasticity refers to an organism's ability to alter its traits—such as morphology, physiology, or behavior—in response to environmental changes. In Synura, scale morphology is strongly affected by abiotic factors including temperature, pH, light intensity, and precipitation. As culture temperature rises, the scales of Synura and Mallomonas generally become smaller and more oval or elongated in shape. Interestingly, at higher temperatures (around 25 °C), scale size can increase again, possibly due to temperature-induced irregularities in scale formation. Because of such phenotypic plasticity, it is crucial to account for morphological variation caused by environmental factors, alongside taxonomic differences, when analyzing specimens.

== Morphological evolution of silica scales in Synura ==
Based on multigene phylogenetic analyses and scale morphology, Synura is divided into three major sublineages: Synura, Curtispinae, and Petersenianae. Throughout the evolutionary history of Synura, scale roundness and pore size have been observed to decrease, which may be associated with enhanced protection against viruses and parasites. Another notable trend is the development of a keel, which appears to contribute to increased structural stability of the scales.

== Habitat and ecological significance ==
Like many other microalgae, Synura serves as a food source for various aquatic organisms. When environmental conditions are optimal for its to growth, certain species can form algal blooms that release ketones, aldehydes, and other organic compounds, leading to strong fishy odors and contamination of water supplies.

Synura is a globally distributed algal genus, and its species can tolerate specific ranges of environmental conditions, allowing them to function as effective bioindicators. Like diatoms, silica scales of Synura resist degradation and persist long after cell death, which can be especially valuable for paleolimnological study.

== Classification ==
Synura is the type and only genus in the family Synuraceae. The present taxonomy recognizes five sections:

- Section Peterseniae
  - S. americana
  - S. australiensis
  - S. borealis
  - S. conopea
  - S. glabra
  - S. heteropora
  - S. hibernica
  - S. laticarina
  - S. longisquama
  - S. macracantha
  - S. macropora
  - S. petersenii
- Section Spinosae
  - S. curtispina
  - S. mollispina
  - S. nygaardii
  - S. sphagnicola
  - S. spinosa
- Section Echinulatae
  - S. biseriata
  - S. echinulata
  - S. leptorrhabda
  - S. mammillosa
  - S. multidentata
- Section Splendidae
  - S. splendida
- Section Uvellae
  - S. uvella
