= P. africanum =

P. africanum may refer to:

- Peltophorum africanum, a tree species in the genus Peltophorum
- Peridinium africanum, a dinoflagellate alga species
- Poroderma africanum, the pyjama shark or striped catshark, a shark species

== Synonyms ==
- Pygeum africanum, a synonym for Prunus africana, a tree species
