= Mallomonas lacuna =

Scientific classification
- Domain: Eukaryota
- Clade: Sar
- Clade: Stramenopiles
- Division: Ochrophyta
- Class: Chrysophyceae
- Order: Synurales
- Family: Mallomonadaceae
- Genus: Mallomonas
- Species: M. lacuna

Binomial name
- Mallomonas lacuna Jo et al., 2013

Species of alga

Mallomonas lacuna is a species of heterokont algae. It is a tiny free-living cell, about the width of a human hair. It has ornate scales and bristles, as well as long spines. It is a relatively common part of lake or pond plankton. It differs from its cogenerates by the number, distribution, and size of its base plate pores, the secondary structures on the scale surfaces, together with characteristics of its bristles.
