= Mallomonas pleuriforamen =

Scientific classification
- Domain: Eukaryota
- Clade: Diaphoretickes
- Clade: SAR
- Clade: Stramenopiles
- Phylum: Gyrista
- Subphylum: Ochrophytina
- Class: Chrysophyceae
- Order: Synurales
- Family: Mallomonadaceae
- Genus: Mallomonas
- Species: M. pleuriforamen

Binomial name
- Mallomonas pleuriforamen Jo et al., 2013

Extinct species of alga

Mallomonas pleuriforamen is an extinct species of heterokont algae. It was first found in Middle Eocene lacustrine deposits from northwestern Canada. It was a tiny free-living cell, about the width of a human hair. It had ornate scales and bristles, as well as long spines. It was a relatively common part of lake or pond plankton. It differs from its cogenerates by the number, distribution, and size of its base plate pores, the secondary structures on the scale surfaces, together with characteristics of its bristles.
