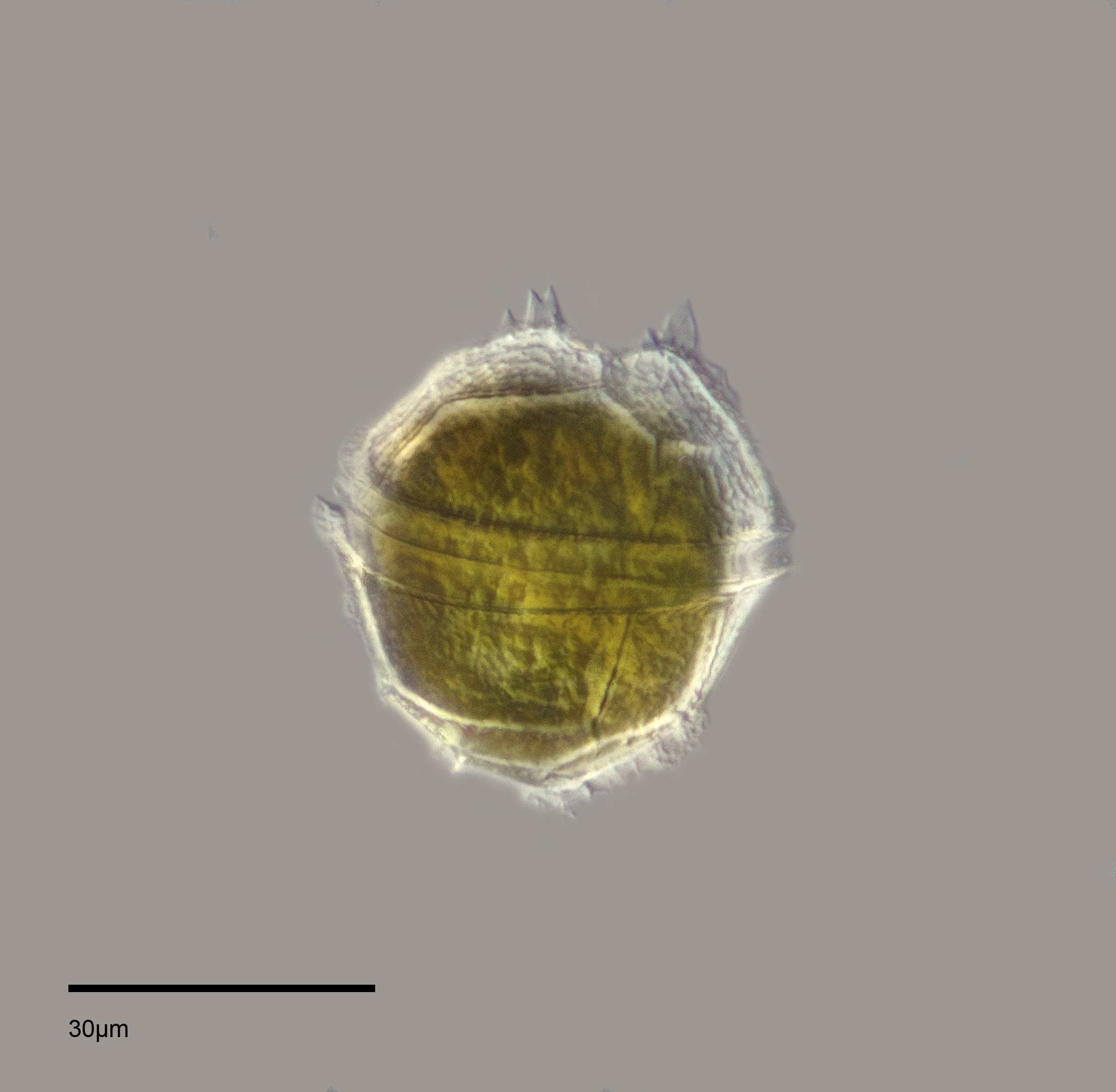

Scientific classification
- Domain: Eukaryota
- Clade: Sar
- Clade: Alveolata
- Division: Dinoflagellata
- Class: Dinophyceae
- Order: Peridiniales
- Family: Peridiniaceae
- Genus: Peridinium
- Species: P. willei

Binomial name
- Peridinium willei Huitfeldt-Kaas

= Peridinium willei =

Species of dinoflagellate

Peridinium willei is a species of Dinoflagellata in the family Peridiniaceae. It has been called perennial.

It is found in the United States, Sweden, Norway, Brazil, and the Netherlands. P. willei lives in fresh water with one study saying it is less likely to live in lakes above 12 degrees or below 4 degrees.
