= Kuno Thomasson =

Estonian-Swedish botanist, phycologist

Kuno Thomasson (9 July 1923 Tallinn – 12 January 2007 Uppsala) was an Estonian-Swedish phycologist, hydrobiologist and ecologist.

In 1944, following the Soviet occupation of Estonia during World War II, he fled to Sweden. In 1950, he graduated from Uppsala University. After graduating he worked at the university's plant ecology institute.

He published publications about algae, limnology and geobotany. He also described several new algae species, e.g. Peridinium lingii.

He was an honorary member of Estonian Naturalists' Society.

Awards:

- 2002: Order of the White Star, IV class.

== Publications ==
- Notes of the plankton of lake Bangweulu (1957, 1960)
- Nahuel Huapi (1959)
- Araucanian lakes (1963)
- Phytoplankton of lake Shiva Ngandu (1966)
- Amazonian algae (1971)
