= Josef Schiller =

Josef Schiller (16 June 1877, in Ringelsheim (Bohemia) – 1960) was an Austrian phycologist and hydrobiologist.

He studied natural sciences at the University of Vienna, earning his doctorate in 1905. Afterwards he was an assistant at the zoological station in Trieste (1905-1910), where he developed an expertise involving benthic algae and phytoplankton. From 1918 he worked as a lecturer of botanical hydrobiology at the University of Vienna, and in 1927 he became an associate professor on the aforementioned subject.

He was a visiting scientist at marine stations in Helgoland, Ragusa, Spolato and Rovigno d'Istria, giving classes in botanical hydrobiology. Later in his career, he conducted research in the field of apiology, being known for his studies on the physiological differences between summer and winter bees. From 1938 to 1947, he was in charge of the investigative body for infectious bee diseases at Vienna's University of Veterinary Medicine.

The genera Schilleriella, Schillerochloris and Schilleriomonas are named after him, as is the algae species Entodictyon schilleri, named in Schiller's honor by Victor Félix Schiffner (1862-1944).

== Selected published works ==
- "Vorläufige Ergebnisse der Phytoplankton-Untersuchungen auf den Fahrten S. M. S. "Najade" in der Adria 1911/12. I. Die Coccolithophoriden", (1913) - Preliminary results of phytoplankton studies undertaken on voyages of the SMS "Naiad" in the Adriatic in 1911/12, The coccolithophores.
- "Österreichische Adriaforschung: Bericht Über Die Allgemeinen Biologischen Verhältnisse Der Flora Des Adriatischen Meeres", 1914 - Austrian Adriatic research: Report on the general biological conditions of flora from the Adriatic Sea.
- "Die planktonischen Vegetationen des adriatischen Meeres", 1926 - Planktonic vegetation of the Adriatic Sea.
- "Dinoflagellatae": Dr. L. Rabenhorst's Kryptogamen-Flora von Deutschland, Österreich und der Schweiz, Volume 2, (1933).
- "Flagellatae: Dinoflagellatae in monographischer Behandlung, Parts 2-3", (1937) - Flagellatae: A monographic treatment of Dinoflagellatae.
- "Untersuchungen an den planktischen Protophyten des Neusiedler Sees 1950-1954" -Investigations of planktonic Protophyta of Lake Neusiedl from 1950 to 1954.

Schiller issued the exsiccata Algae Adriaticae exsiccatae and superseding series, in parts with Hermann Josef Cammerloher and Gustav Seefeldner.
