= Gunnar Nygaard (phycologist) =

Danish phycologist

Gunnar Nygaard (surname often spelled "Nygård"; 12 October 1903 – 25 September 2002) was a Danish phycologist, and a leading authority on the ecology and taxonomy of Danish phytoplankton. Nygaard completed his master's at University of Copenhagen, initially working at the Freshwater Biological Laboratory in Hillerød as a research stipendiary. From 1933 until his retirement in 1972 he was employed as a lecturer in the Danish grammar school system. Thereafter, he was provided an office at the Freshwater Biological Laboratory to facilitate his work. In recognition of his scientific contributions, the University of Copenhagen awarded him the degree dr. scient. honoris causa.

== Publications ==
- Ostenfeld, C.H.; Nygaard, G. (1925). "On the phytoplankton of the Gatun lake, Panama Canal". Dansk Botanisk Arkiv. 4 (10): 1–16.
- Nygaard, G. (1926). "Plankton from two lakes of the Malayan region". Videnskabelige Meddelelser Fra Dansk Naturhistorisk Forming. 82: 197–240.
- Berg, K.; Nygaard, G. (1929). "Studies on the plankton in the Lake of Frederiksborg Castle". Det Kongelige Danske Videnskabernes Selskabs Skrifter, Naturvidenskabelig og Mathematisk Afdeling. 9. 1 (4): 227–316.
- Nygaard, G.; Stephens, E. L. (1932). "Contributions to our knowledge of the freshwater algae of Africa. 9. Freshwater algae and phytoplankton from the Transvaal". Transactions of the Royal Society of South Africa. 20 (2): 101–148. doi:10.1080/00359193209518854.
- Nygaard, G. (1938). "Hydrobiologische Studien über danische Teiche and Seen. 1. Teil: Chemisch-physikalische Untersuchungen and Planktonwagungen". Archiv für Hydrobiologie. 32: 523–692.
- Nygaard G. (1945) Dansk planteplankton. Gyldendal, Copenhagen. 52 pp.
- Nygaard, G. (1949). "Hydrobiological studies on some Danish ponds and lakes. Part 2. The quotient hypothesis and some new or little known phytoplankton organisms". Det Kongelige Danske Videnskabernes Selskab, Biologiske Skrifter. 7 (1): 1–293. ISSN 0366-3612.
- Nygaard, G. (1949). "A simple micromanipulator". Science. 110 (2850): 165–166. Bibcode:1949Sci...110..165N. doi:10.1126/science.110.2850.165. PMID 17755246.
- Nygaard, G. (1951). "How to make permanent fluid mounts of plankton organisms". Hydrobiologia. 3 (3): 282–289. doi:10.1007/BF00043719. S2CID 28439311.
- Nygaard, G. (1954). "A new diatom species and two new varieties from plankton in Lake Taserssuatsiaq. (Appendix to TW. Bother: Oceanic and continental vegetational complexes in Southwest Greenland)". Meddelelser om Grønland. 148 (1): 311–313.
- Nygaard, G. (1955). "On the productivity of five Danish waters". Proceedings of the International Association of Theoretical and Applied Limnology. 12: 123–133.
- Nygaard, G. (1956). "The ancient and recent flora of diatoms and Chrysophyceae in Lake Gribso". Folia Limnologica Scandinavica. 8: 32–94. ISSN 0367-2476.
- Nygaard G. (1956) Phytoplankton. In: Berg K. & Pedersen LC. (eds.): Studies on the humic acid Lake Gribso. Folia Limnologica Scandinavica 8: 144 ISSN 0367-2476.
- Nygaard, G. (1958). "Produktions- og milieuundersogelser i Fureso". Folia Limnologica Scandinavica. 10: 97–104. ISSN 0367-2476.
- Nygaard, G. (1958). "On the productivity of the bottom vegetation in Lake Grane Langsø". Proceedings of the International Association of Theoretical and Applied Limnology. 13: 144155.
- Nygaard, G. (1965). "Hydrographic studies, especially on the carbon dioxide system, in Grane Langsø. Det Kongelige Danske Videnskabernes Selskab". Biologiske Skrifter. 14 (2): 1110. ISSN 0366-3612.
- Nygaard, G. (1968). "On the significance of the carrier carbon dioxide in determination of the primary production in soft water lakes by the radiocarbon technique". International Association of Theoretical and Applied Limnology, Communications. 14: 11–121.
- Nygaard, G. (1976). "Desmids from an arctic salt lake". Botanisk Tidsskrift. 71: 84–86.
- Nygaard G. (1976) Tavlerne fra "Dansk Planteplankton". Gyldendal, Copenhagen. 26 pp.
- Nygaard, G. (1977). "Vertical and seasonal distribution of some motile plankton algae in relation to some environmental factors". Algological Studies. 18: 67–76. ISSN 1864-1318.
- Nygaard, G. (1977). "On making fluid mounts of plankton algae". Phycologia. 16 (3): 351. doi:10.2216/i0031-8884-16-3-351.1.
- Nygaard, G. (1977). "New or interesting plankton algae. With a contribution on their ecology. Det Kongelige Danske Videnskabernes Selskab". Biologiske Skrifter. 21 (1): 1–107. ISSN 0366-3612.
- Nygaard, G. (1979). "Freshwater phytoplankton from the Narssaq area, South Greenland". Botanisk Tidsskrift. 73: 191–238.
- Nygaard, G.; Sand-Jensen, K. (1981). "Light climate and metabolism of Nitella flexilis(L.) Ag. in the bottom waters of oligotrophic Lake Grane Langsø, Denmark". Internationale Revue der gesamten Hydrobiologie und Hydrographie. 66 (5): 685–699. doi:10.1002/iroh.19810660506.
- Nygaard, G.; Komarek, J.; Kristiansen, J.; Skulberg, O. (1987). "Taxonomic designations of the bioassay alga NIVA-CHLI ('Selenastrum capricornutum') and some related strains". Opera Botanica. 90: 1–46. ISSN 0078-5237.
- Nygaard, G. (1989). "Some observations on the irradiance and carbon fixation in Grane Langsø". Internationale Revue der gesamten Hydrobiologie und Hydrographie. 74 (3): 293–319. doi:10.1002/iroh.19890740307.
- Nygaard, G. (1991). "Seasonal periodicity of planktonic desmids in oligotrophic Lake Grane Langsø, Denmark". Hydrobiologia. 211 (3): 195–226. doi:10.1007/BF00008535. S2CID 20454873.
- Nygaard, G. (1994). "A community of epiphytic diatoms living on low irradiances". Nordic Journal of Botany. 14 (3): 345–360. doi:10.1111/j.1756-1051.1994.tb00618.x.
- Nygaard, G. (1996). "Temporal and spatial development of individual species of plankton algae from European lakes". Hydrobiologia. 332 (2): 71–91. doi:10.1007/BF00016687. S2CID 13130303.
- Nygaard, G. (1999). "Epiphytic diatoms in oligotrophic Lake Grane Langsø, Denmark". Nordic Journal of Botany. 19 (2): 245–255. doi:10.1111/j.1756-1051.1999.tb00671.x.
- Nygaard, G. (2001). Kristiansen, Jørgen (ed.). Dansk planteplankton (3rd ed.). Copenhagen: Gyldendal. ISBN 978-87-00-49912-6.
