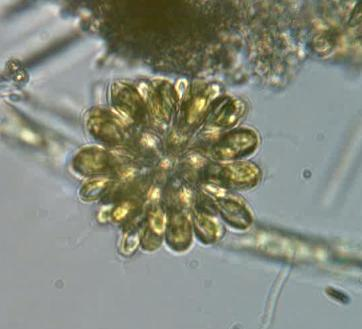
- A colony of Synura sp.

Scientific classification
- Domain: Eukaryota
- Clade: Sar
- Clade: Stramenopiles
- Division: Ochrophyta
- Class: Chrysophyceae
- Order: Synurales; Andersen, 1987

Genera
- Mallomonas; Synura; Tessellaria

= Synurid =

Synurids

Group of algae

The synurids (order Synurales) are a small group of heterokont algae, found mostly in freshwater environments, characterized by cells covered in silica scales.

== Characteristics ==
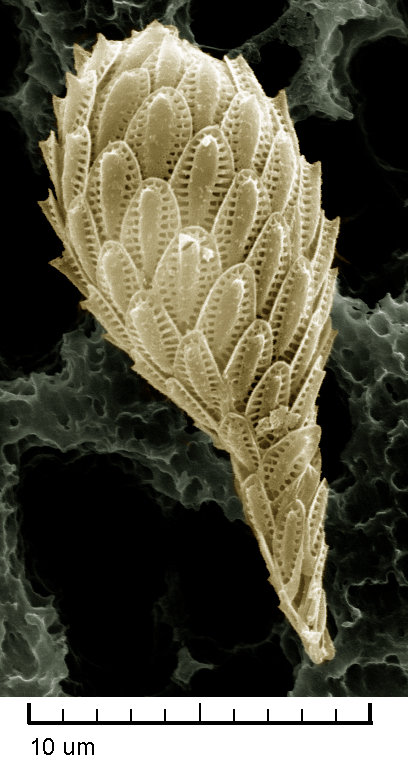
A single cell of the freshwater algae species Synura petersenii, false color image created using SEM

They are covered in silicate scales and spines. In Synura, these are formed on the surface of the chloroplasts, two of which are usually present, but sometimes only one divided into two lobes is seen. The cells have two heterokont flagella, inserted parallel to one another at the anterior, whose ultrastructure is a distinguishing characteristic of the group. Both asexual and isogamous sexual reproduction occur.

== Morphology ==
Representation of a synurophyte: 1. Flagellum with mastigonemes; 2. Residual flagellum with swelling; 3. Surface scale; 4. Golgi apparatus; modifies proteins and sends them out of the cell; 5. Plastid membranes (4, secondary red); 6. Thylakoid, site of the light-dependent reactions of photosynthesis; 7. Nucleus; 8. Endoplasmic reticulum, the transport network for molecules going to specific parts of the cell; 9. Mitochondrion, creates ATP (energy) for the cell, tubular cristae; 10. Lysosome, holds enzymes; 11. Phagocytic vacuole with prey; 12. Bristle; 13. Dome; 14. V-rib; 15. Shield; 16. Hood; 17. Flange

== Classification ==
Synurales are divided into three families, each with one genus:

- Family Mallomonadaceae Diesing, 1866
  - Mallomonas Perty, 1852
- Family Synuraceae Lemmermann, 1899 emend. B.Y. Jo, J.I. Kim, W. Shin, P.Škaloud & P. Siver, 2016
  - Synura Ehrenberg, 1834
- Family Neotessellaceae B.Y. Jo, J.I. Kim, W. Shin, P.Škaloud & P. Siver, 2016
  - Neotessella B.Y. Jo, J.I. Kim, W. Shin, P.Škaloud & P. Siver, 2016 (=Tessella Playfair, 1915 nom. illeg.)

== History ==
The genus Synura was proposed in 1834 by the German microscopist Christian Gottfried Ehrenberg (1795–1876).

The synurids were originally included among the golden algae in the order Ochromonadales as the family Mallomonadaceae or as the family Synuraceae . They were formally defined as a separate group by Andersen in 1987, who placed them in their own class Synurophyceae, based on an earlier approach of more narrowly defining major lineages of chrysophyte algae by British phycologist David Hibberd.

The Chrysophyceae and Synurophyceae are currently recognized as closely related taxa within the Stramenopiles. Present classifications include the synurids as an order (Synurales) within Chrysophyceae.
